= Taiping Municipal Council =

Taiping Municipal Council Majlis Perbandaran Taiping
- Local Government Act 1976

Type
- Type: Municipal Council of Taiping, Perak

History
- Founded: 1 September 1979
- Preceded by: Taiping Local Authority Administration Board

Motto
- Aman Selama-lamanya; Everlasting Peace

Meeting place
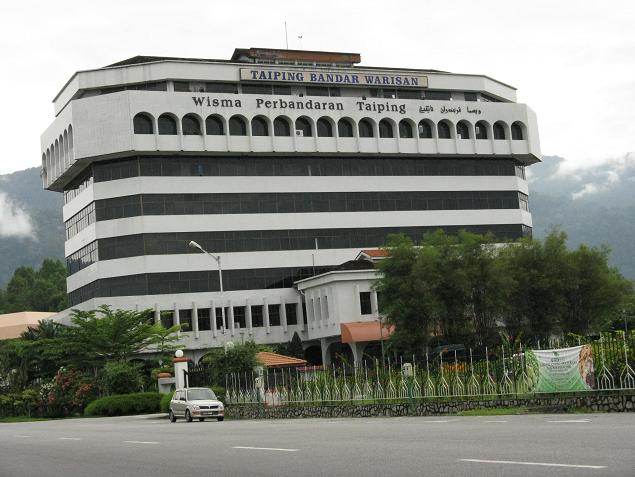
- Wisma Perbandaran Taiping, Jalan Taming Sari, 34000 Taiping, Perak

Website
- www.mptaiping.gov.my

Taiping Municipal Council (Malay: Majlis Perbandaran Taiping, abbreviated MPT) is the municipal council which administers Taiping in the state of Perak, Malaysia. This council was established after the township. Their jurisdiction covers an area of 186.46 square kilometres.

The council consists of the mayor plus twenty-three councillors appointed to serve a one-year term by the Perak State Government. MPT is responsible for public health and sanitation, waste removal and management, town planning, environmental protection and building control, social and economic development and general maintenance functions of urban infrastructure

== History ==
MPT started as a Sanitary Board in 1874, formed by the British. From its gradual and sturdy development, it obtained Taiping Local Authority Administration Board (LPKTT) its Municipal status on 1 September 1979.

In general, the council as the local authority, is a Corporate Body established under the Local Government Act 1976 (Act 171), being the body responsible for managing the Taiping area based on local interest, as well as a local planning authority under the Town and Country Planning Act 1976 (Act 172); MPT is directly tasked by Law to formulate and implement development planning policies based on centralised locality in accordance to the policies set by the Government.

== Administrative area ==
Current and predicted Taiping town population.

Currently, the boundary of the Council covers an area of 186.46 square kilometres with a population of over 198,112 people.

The following towns, suburbs, and neighbourhoods comprise the area formally (and collectively) under MPT:

- Kamunting
- Aulong
- Pokok Assam
- Air Kuning
- Changkat Jering
- Simpang
- Kampung Paya
- Kampung Jelutong
- Kampung Cheh
- Kampung Pauh
- Kampung Dew
- Changkat Ibol
- Bukit Gantang
- Rancangan Perkampungan tersusun Kpg Ulu Tupai
- Tupai Industrial Area
- Green House Area
- Assam Kumbang
- Bukit Jana
- Kampung Boyan
- Larut Tin
- Klian Pauh
- Taiping Heights
- Ayer Putih
- Kampung Pinang
- Matang
- Kuala Sepetang
- Kampung Senduk Tengah
- Kampung Batu Tegoh

== Current appointed councillors ==
Here are the appointed councillors from :-
