= Larut Rail Tunnel =

Railway tunnel in Malaysia

Coordinates: 4.7760864°N 100.8250287°E

- Interactive map of Larut Rail Tunnel

Overview
- Location: Changkat Jering, Perak, Malaysia
- Status: Operational

Operation
- Work began: 2008
- Constructed: MMC-Gamuda
- Opened: 2013
- Owner: Keretapi Tanah Melayu Berhad (KTMB)
- Operator: Keretapi Tanah Melayu Berhad (KTMB)

Technical
- Length: 300 metres

The Larut Rail Tunnel is the rail tunnel in Malaysia. It is located in Bukit Berapit near Bukit Gantang, Perak, Malaysia. It is made as part of the Ipoh-Padang Besar Electrified Double Tracking Project.

== History ==
Construction of the tunnel was started in 2008 by a joint venture of MMC Corporation Berhad and Gamuda Berhad as part of their electrified double tracking project between Ipoh and Padang Besar and is expected to complete by 2013. And now, it has been commissioned and is in operation.
