= Kampung Boyan =

Village in north bank of the Sarawak River, Malaysia

Kampung Boyan is a malay village situated on the north bank of the Sarawak River, within the Taiping, Larut, Matang and Selama District, of Perak, Malaysia. Originally a tin mining area in the 1980s, the village gained attention after the rapid development of the Taman and Kamunting neighbourhoods in the 1980s and 1990s. Resulting in road development connecting the village to Taman Long Jaafar.

The name of the village is believed to have been derived from the Baweanese (Boyanese) people who inhabited the area during colonial times, when the Lumba Kuda race course was still located in Taiping. With the relocation of the race course to Ipoh, many of the Boyanese also migrated to the new location. The Boyanese people, unlike other Indonesian ethnic groups, such as those from Acheh, Kampar or Java, have a more nomadic lifestyle. As a result, it has become increasingly difficult to locate original Boyanese locals residing in the Kampung Boyan area.

Initially, the Mussolla (small mosque) "Surau Kampung Boyan" was located near the railway station. However, a larger mosque was erected in Aulong, which was previously a part of Kampung Boyan.
