= Kota Long Jaafar =

Defensive fort and residence in Bukit Gantang, Perak, Malaysia

Long Jaafar's Fort
- Kota Long Jaafar (in Malay)
- Larut, Matang and Selama District, Malaysia

Site information
- Open to the public: Yes

Site history
- Built: 1820
- Built by: Long Jaafar
- In use: 1820-1857

Garrison information
- Past commanders: Long Jaafar

Kota Long Jaafar is a defensive fort and residence built by Long Jaafar in Bukit Gantang, Perak, in 1820. The fort site measures 5 ha (12 acres).

== History ==
The fort was made from bricks and mud, the first such fort in Perak. Its walls are 2.5 meter high and took five years to complete. It acted as a defensive fort during the Siam invasion. Long Jaafar mansion was situated in the middle with a lake called Takungan Menteri at the front.

Long Jaafar died in 1857 and was buried within his fort. He was succeeded by son Ngah Ibrahim.
