= Convent Taiping =

All-girls school in Taiping, Perak, Malaysia

Coordinates: 4°50′47.8″N 100°44′12.6″E

Location
- Jalan Convent, 34000; Taiping, Perak; Malaysia

Information
- Type: All-girls primary and secondary school
- Motto: Simple in Virtue and Steadfast in Duty
- Religious affiliation: Christian
- Denomination: Roman Catholic Church
- Established: 1899
- School district: Larut, Matang and Selama
- Principal: Pn. Suraya Binti Sabaruddin
- Grades: Form 1 - 5
- Gender: Female
- Enrollment: 543 (FY 2019)
- Feeder schools: SK Convent, Taiping; SMK Convent, Taiping
- Founder: Christian Nuns
- Employees: 47 teachers and 19 general workers
- Website: www.smkct.net

Convent Taiping is an all-girls school located on Convent Lane in Kota, Taiping. The primary school is one of the 40 Convent primary schools in Malaysia, while the secondary school is one of 30 Convent secondary schools in Malaysia.

== History ==
Convent Taiping School was originally a Catholic girls school for students of all races regardless of religion, with motto Simple in Virtue and Steadfast in Duty. The school was founded by Rev. Father Clement Charles Grenier from Penang, following a request from the Catholic families for a girls school in Taiping. The school was the brainchild of Rev. Father Clement Charles Grenier, when he visited the town in 1898.

On 23 February 1899, under the decree from Monsignor Fee, Rev. Mother Anselm, Superior of the Convent in Penang, sent three nuns, namely, Sister Prudence, Sister Angela and Sister Cecile to Taiping and established the first convent school at Kelian Pauh, Taiping. By March of the same year 75 students had registered and beginnings were being made for Indian girls. When the British Resident of Perak, Sir John Pickersgill Rodger, accompanied by the Inspector of Schools paid a visit to the school, a change was made whereby the school would be funded by the State Government.

On 28 July 1902, primary classes were started in the new classrooms at the Convent Kelian Pauh. In December 1902, four candidates from the school set out for Penang to sit for the preliminary examination of the forerunner of the Junior Cambridge Certificate. In 1900, Mother Clothide became the first headmistress for an Indian girls school; known as St. Theresa Convent with 26 students. In 1912, the school, under the second principal, Rev. Mother St. John Baptist, was granted the status of 'First Class Grant' from the British Government to the school.

In 1931 the Kelian Pauh Convent was shifted to the town centre at Convent Lane, Kota and renamed Convent Kota. The convent nuns conducted classes for the children and an orphanage for the unwanted children. The present buildings for the secondary school date back to 1938, situated next to the St. Louis Church. In 1932, under the tenure of Mother Ethienna, ten students sat for the Junior Cambridge Examination and the number of students increased to 286, with 12 teachers.

During the Second World War, the British administrators converted the school into a military hospital. When the British troops surrendered to the Japanese government, the school was turned into a Gunsei Kanbu or Japanese military headquarters. All nuns were under house detentions, while some were imprisoned or brutally killed. The school had survived without any damage during the war, and when the war ended and the British returned, school activities returned to normal.

In 1951, the number of students increased to 1034 with 39 teachers. During the 1950s, the enrolment had increased significantly so 'Notre Dame' or the new primary school building was built near the school compound where it could accommodate 1000 students. In 1958, which is one year after the completion of the Convent Primary School, the principal, Mother Vincent, was replaced by Mother Louis and the school was separated into two units, the primary and secondary where both schools were administered by different principals. There were 1320 students and 31 teachers in the primary school and 503 students and 21 teachers in the secondary school.

== List of Principals ==
- 1900 - 1912 - Rev. Mother Clothlide (1st posting)
- 1912 - 1921 - Rev. Mother Saint John Baptist (1st posting)
- 1921 - 1932 - Rev. Mother Clothlide (2nd posting)
- 1932 - 1945 - Rev. Mother Elienna
- 1945 - 1951 - Rev. Mother Saint John Baptist (2nd posting)
- 1951 - 1953 - Rev. Mother Theophane
- 1953 - 1958 - Rev. Mother Louis
- 1958 - 1965 - Rev. Mother Vincent
- 1965 - 1972 - Rev. Mother Pius
- 1972 - 1976 - Rev. Mother Cyril
- 1976 - 1985 - Rev. Mother Teresa
- 1991 - 1995 - Mdm. Normah Binti Mohamad
- 1995 - 2000 - Mdm. Aishah Binti Yeit
- 2000 - 2003 - Mdm. Hasnah Binti Hamid
- 2004 - 2006 - Ms. Helen Teoh Poh Gim
- 2006 - 2010 - Mdm. Hjh. Che Su Binti Hj. Mahamud
- 2010 - 2017 - Mdm. Rahimah Binti Jamaludin
- 2018 - 2024 - Mdm. Saharidah Binti Sahaban
- 2024 - 2026 - Mdm. Norehan Binti Ibrahim
- 2026 - present - Mdm. Suraya Binti Sabaruddin

== Attacks ==
On 10 January 2010, it was reported by the Malaysian Insider that Molotov cocktails were found near the school compounds. The home-made bombs did not explode. It is believed that the incidents happened due to the radical Muslim protesters against the use of the term 'Allah' by the Catholic runs weekly magazine, in which the use of the term is allowed by the High Court of Malaya.

== See also ==
- Education in Malaysia
