= All Saints' Church, Taiping =

All Saints' Church
- Malay: Gereja Para Kudus
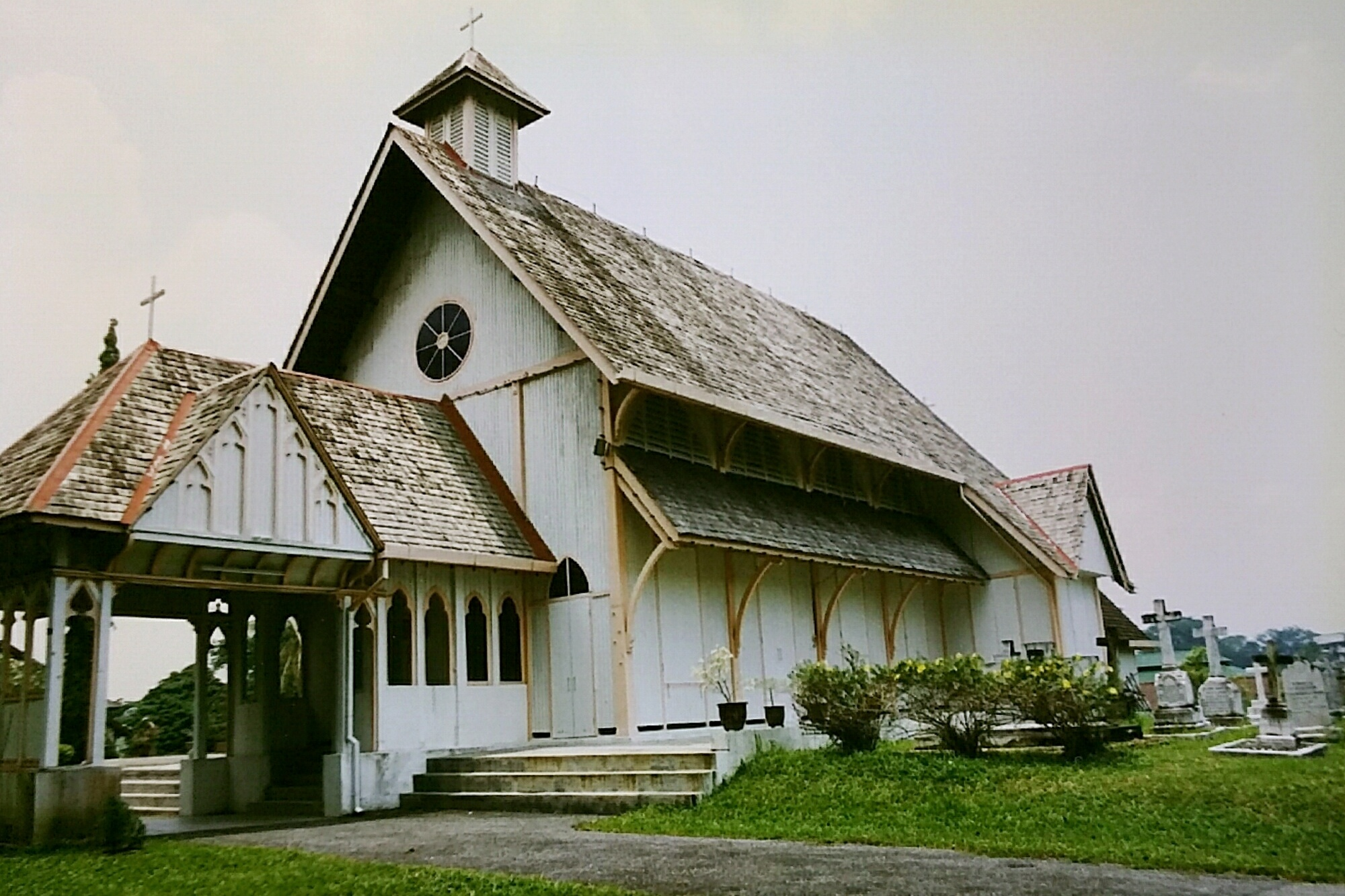
- All Saints' Church in Taiping, Perak, the oldest Christian church in Malaysia.
- All Saints' Church
- 04°51′29.52″N 100°44′39.552″E
- Location: 17-A, Jalan Taming Sari, 34000 Taiping, Perak
- Country: Malaysia
- Denomination: Anglican

History
- Founded: 1886
- Consecrated: 1887

Architecture
- Functional status: Active
- Architect: D. Lefroy
- Architectural type: Gothic

Administration
- Province: Province of South East Asia
- Diocese: Diocese of West Malaysia
- Archdeaconry: Lower North Archdeaconry

Clergy
- Priest: Rev Allan Selvadas

The All Saints' Church is a church in Taiping, Larut, Matang and Selama District, Perak, Malaysia. It was the first church in the Federated Malay States, founded in 1886 (consecrated in 1887). Located on Taming Sari main road, the church sits in the outskirts of Taiping.

The church features a timber facade and gothic architectural design, with a small adjacent cemetery. Its cemetery is laden with beautifully crafted tombstones of European settlers and young servicemen who did not make it home.

It is considered one of Malaysia's precious heritage sites.

== History ==
The history of the church can be traced from 1883 when Col. R.S.F. Walker presided over a meeting to arrange for funds to be collected to pay for the stipend of a clergyman.

Designed by Australian architect G. A. Lefroy and built on a site donated by W.V. Drummond, a planter from Shanghai, the wooden church structure is made of meranti panels with hardwood frames, and a louvred tower with four tubular bells.

All Saints' Church remains largely unchanged from the early days of its existence. Perhaps the most striking feature of the church is the stained glass window installed in 1911, which survived World War II intact.

All Saints' is among only a handful of churches in Malaysia that still use the pipe organ. It is only used on special occasions and the servicing alone costs about RM10,000 annually.

== Developments ==
Over the years, the church has undergone some repair work with the most recent restoration effort including the replacement of its leaky roof with Berlian Shingle wood from Sarawak. The new roof is a replica of the original structure.

A new multi-purpose hall was scheduled to be completed in 2008, with toilet facilities, administrative office, choir rooms, library, vicarage quarters and main hall that can accommodate about 350 people.

The church is currently in the midst of setting up a network to locate relatives of those buried at the All Saints' cemetery.

== See also ==
- Christianity in Malaysia
