= Kampung Jelutong =

Coordinates: 6°30′N 100°17′E

Kampung Jelutong is a small village in Changkat Jering, Larut, Matang and Selama District, Perak, Malaysia. Just 230 km southeast of the capital, Kuala Lumpur, its primary tourist attraction is white water rafting. Its postal code is 08200.

== Schools ==
- Sekolah Kebangsaan Jelutong
- Sekolah Ugama Jelutong

== Shops & Services ==
- Caltex petrol kiosk
- Barber shop
- Coffee shops
- Motorcycle repair shop
- Sundry shops
- Telecom sub-station
- White water rafting

== Communities ==
- Jelutong Mosque
- Local people's hall
- Camping ground
