= Bukit Berapit Rail Tunnel =

Coordinates: 04°46′36.3″N 100°47′52.3″E

- Interactive map of Bukit Berapit Rail Tunnel

Overview
- Location: Bukit Berapit, Perak, Malaysia
- Status: Operational

Operation
- Work began: 2008
- Constructed: MMC-Gamuda
- Opened: 2013
- Owner: Keretapi Tanah Melayu Berhad (KTMB)
- Operator: Keretapi Tanah Melayu Berhad (KTMB)

Technical
- Length: 3.3 km (2.1 mi)

The Bukit Berapit Rail Tunnel (Malay: Terowong Kereta Api Bukit Berapit) is a twin rail tunnel passing under the Bintang Mountains, located between Padang Rengas in Kuala Kangsar District and Bukit Berapit near Bukit Gantang in Larut, Matang and Selama District, Perak. Malaysia. Measuring at 3.3 km, it is the second longest rail tunnel in Malaysia and Southeast Asia, surpassed only by the Genting Tunnel of the ECRL.

== History ==
The tunnel was constructed as part of the Ipoh–Padang Besar Double Tracking and Electrification Project to replace to the old winding tracks with many tunnels. The completion of this tunnel saw the Bukit Berapit Halt closure.

Construction of the tunnel was started in 2008 and was completed in 2013. And now, it has been commissioned and is in operation.
