= Treacher Methodist Girls' School =

- Sekolah Perempuan Treacher Methodist

Location
- No 5, Jalan Muzium, 34000 Taiping, Perak, Malaysia; Taiping, Perak; Malaysia

Information
- Type: All-girls primary school, secondary school
- Motto: Live Worthily
- Religious affiliation: Christian
- Denomination: Methodist Church
- Established: 1889
- School district: Larut, Matang and Selama
- Principal: Mrs. Fuziah Binti Tak
- Grades: 1-5
- Enrollment: 856 (FY 2008)
- Colours: Blue and white
- Founder: Methodist Missionaries
- Chairman: Mrs. Polly Tan nee Wong Mei Lan
- Employees: 55 teachers
- Abbreviation: TMGS
- Website: www.tmgs.edu.my

Treacher Methodist Girls' School (Malay: Sekolah Perempuan Treacher Methodist; abbreviated TMGS; formerly known as Lady Treacher Girls' School) is located at Museum Road (Jalan Muzium) off Walker Road (Jalan Temenggung) in Taiping, Perak, Malaysia.

== History ==
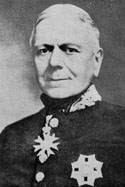
Sir William Hood Treacher, the founder's husband

Lady Treacher Girls’ School was the first English girls’ school in the Federated Malay States and was established in 1889 in Taiping, Perak. Its first name was English Government Girls’ School. The school’s establishment was devoted to Lady Treacher who was the wife of the then British Resident of Perak, Sir William Hood Treacher.

Establishing a girls’ school was Lady Treacher’s ambition and passion; she embodied herself to raise funds for building the school and work hard to make it a success. In 1889, a small wooden building was erected and able to accommodate eight students. After ten years, in 1898, the Perak State Government lost its interest to fund the school. Hence, in 1899, Lady Treacher held a meeting with Bishop James Thoburn to put the school under missionaries' care. On 4 May 1899, the decision was made that the school would be administered by missionaries, and Mrs. Mary Carr Curtis from Penang became the first principal with 28 students at that time.

In 1901, during the tenured of Ms. Mary Cody, the school went under a major renovation and expanded its building. In 1902, the school changed its name to Lady Treacher Girls’ School to honour its early pioneer Lady Treacher. On the same year, a hostel was built and occupied by 25 students, and the school was under a new principal Ms. Catherine Ethel Jackson with 41 students.

In 1908, the school had prepared six girls for the standard six examinations for the first time. When World War I was waged in Europe, the school continued to operate normally, and the 1918 student enrollment count increased to 108. In 1899, a primary school, bearing the name Lady Treacher Girls’ School, was established in Race Course Road. The school was later named Treacher Girls’ School. In 1901, the administration of the school was taken over by Methodists and renamed as Treacher Methodist Girls’ School. The school is located at Upper Museum Road, which is near the Perak Museum. The school was the first girls’ school to receive financial support from the state government since its establishment.

== List of Principals ==
Tenure	Principal
1899–1901	Mary Carr Curtis
1901–1909	Catherine Ethel Jackson
1909–1912	Thirza Bunce
1913–1919	Minnie L. Rank
1920–1921	Jennie Dean
1922–1925	Norma Craven (1st posting)
1926–1928	Ruth Harvey
1929–1930	Lois Rea
1931–1931	Martha Shively
1932–1934	Norma Craven (2nd posting)
1935–1941	Della Olson
1941–1945	World War II, Japanese Occupation
1945–1946	Glory Jeyamoney
1946–1952	Della Olson
1952–1953	Helen Desjardins
1957–1972	Flora R. Knight
1972–1991	Satwant Kaur Saini
1991–1999	Azizah Hj. Taib
1999–2006	Zaitone Shaffie
2006–2007	Salmah Jaapar
2007–2011	Noriza Dato’ Sulaiman
2012–2014	Junaidah Haji Jaafar
2015-now	Fuziah bt Tak
