= New village =

Concentration camps set up by the British during the Malayan Emergency

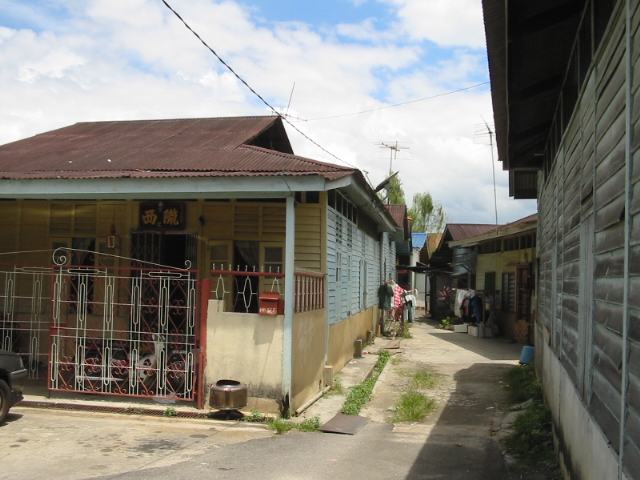
Gombak New Village

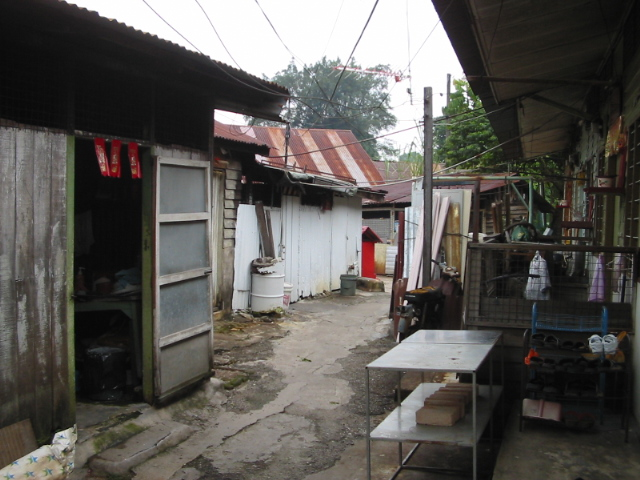
Loke Yew New Village in Kuala Lumpur

New villages (Chinese: 新村; pinyin: Xīncūn; Malay: Kampung baru), also known as Chinese new villages (Chinese: 华人新村; pinyin: Huárén Xīncūn, Malay: Kampung baru Cina), were concentration camps created during the waning days of British rule in Malaysia. They were originally created as part of the Briggs Plan, first implemented in 1950, to isolate guerillas from their supporters within the rural civilian populations during the Malayan Emergency. Most were surrounded by barbed wire and watchtowers to stop people from escaping, with guards being ordered to kill anyone who attempted to leave outside of curfew hours.

Since the British left Malaya, many former new villages have grown into ordinary residential towns and villages.

== History ==
The original purpose of the new villages in Malaya was to stop contact between ethnic Chinese villagers and the Malayan National Liberation Army (MNLA), led by the Malayan Communist Party. It was part of the Briggs Plan, a military plan devised by Sir Harold Briggs shortly after his appointment in 1950 as the British military's Director of Operations in Malaya.

The plan aimed to defeat the MNLA, which was operating out of rural regions of Malaya as a guerrilla force, by cutting them off from their sources of support, mainly amongst the rural population. To this end, a massive program of forced resettlement of rural workers was undertaken, under which about 500,000 people (roughly 10% of Malaya's population) were eventually transferred from their homes and housed in guarded camps termed "new villages". These new villages were usually surrounded by barbed wire and sentry posts. In some cases 22-hour curfews were placed on the populations of new villages, as was the case in the Tanjong Malim New Village. Although most of the victims of the forced relocation and new villages were ethnically Chinese, the aboriginal Orang Asli were also a target due to their homelands being in the regions frequented by the MNLA. Believing that the Orang Asli were supporting the MNLA, many of them were forcibly transferred to the new villages. However, the transfer scheme was halted when many of the Orang Asli started to die of diseases while in the new villages.

By isolating this population in the new villages, the British were able to stem the critical flow of material, information, and recruits from peasant sympathizers to the guerrillas. The new camps were guarded by soldiers, police, and were partially fortified to stop people from escaping. This served the twofold purpose of preventing those who were so inclined from sneaking out and voluntarily aiding the guerrillas, and of preventing the guerrillas from sneaking in and extracting aid via persuasion or brute force. Upon completion of the resettlement program, the British initiated a starvation campaign, rationing food supplies within the camps and torching rural farmlands to starve out the Communists guerrillas.

== Population ==
During the Malayan Emergency, 450 new settlements were created and it is estimated that 470,509 people, 400,000 of them Chinese, were involved in the resettlement program. The Malaysian Chinese Association, then the Malayan Chinese Association, was initially created to address the social and welfare concerns of the populations in the new villages.

It is estimated that today, about 1.2 million people live in 450 new villages throughout Peninsular Malaysia. About 85% of the population in new villages are ethnically Chinese.

== Historical evaluation ==
According to British historian John Newsinger, people transferred to live in the new villages were "effectively deprived of all civil rights". Although the majority of inhabitants were Chinese, thousands of Orang Asli were forcefully transferred to the "new villages". Historian John D. Leary in his study of the Orang Asli during the Emergency argued that the forced resettlement used to create the new villages brought "misery, disease and death" to many Malaysians.

== Notable new villages ==
Distribution of New Villages in Malaysia

- (Federal Territories of Malaysia) Jinjang
- (Johor) Kampung Tengah
- (Johor) Labis
- (Selangor) Seri Kembangan
- (Selangor) Gombak
- (Selangor) Ampang
- (Selangor) Jenjarom
- (Perak) Buntong
- (Perak) Aulong
- (Perak) Pokok Assam
- (Negeri Sembilan) Lukut
- (Penang) Machang Bubok
- (Malacca) Machap Baru

== See also ==
- Bantustan
- Planned community
- Slum
- Strategic Hamlet Program
- Villagization
