= Low Yok Lin =

Malaysian businessman, founder of the Malayan Broadcasting Service

- 南洋名人集传
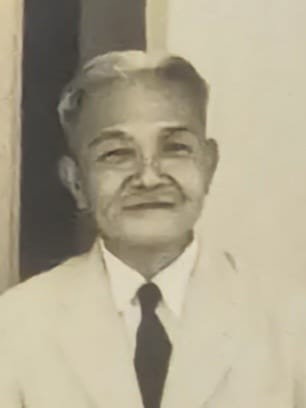
- Undated photo of Low Yok Lin
- Born: 1894; China
- Died: 1976 (aged 81–82)
- Other names: Low Yoke Lin or Lau Yok Lin
- Occupation: Businessman
- Known for: Founder of the Malayan Broadcasting Service

Low Yok Lin (1894–1976) was a Malaysian businessman and philanthropist.

Yok Lin had an entry in the "Biographies of Prominent Personalities in Nanyang", a document cited by academic circles as an important resource for historical researchers interested in Chinese figures in Nanyang . (Chinese: 南洋名人集传). It consists of a distinguished compilation of Chinese figures in Southeast Asia.

== Early life ==
Low Yok Lin (also romanized Low Yoke Lin or Lau Yok Lin) (Chinese: 劉毓麟) came to Malaya from China in the early 1900s. He immigrated to Malaya, where he established his life and career.

== Forming Malayan Broadcasting Service ==
Low established the Malayan Broadcasting Service ("MBS") in 1927, a national media organization. Yok Lin was listed as MBS' founding director in the prospectus of the initial public offering (IPO). The name, Malayan Broadcasting Service was also used synonymously as Radio-Malaya Singapore in 1946.

== Other business ventures ==
Like other early immigrants to Malaya (the former name for Malaysia), Yok Lin came with nothing. He built his enterprise in diverse industries, such as rubber cultivation. He served as the president of the Taiping Chinese Rubber Association, during a period when Malaysia became the world's foremost rubber producer from 1930 onwards. Taiping, situated in Perak, was one of the main producers during this global rubber production surge.

He diversified into other businesses, including tin mining, hardware supply, brick production, and plantation management. He frequently engaged with the press to discuss economic conditions and trends.

== Philanthropy ==
Low Yok Lin was involved in various philanthropic endeavors. His philanthropic efforts included:

=== Leadership in cultural and community organizations ===
Yok Lin was the founder of the '励德社' (Lì Dé Shè) Society, which translates to 'Society of Encouraging Virtue' or 'Society for Promoting Moral Integrity.' It is often used to refer to organizations or groups that aim to promote and encourage virtuous behavior and moral values in society, and this term is associated with traditional Chinese ethical and Confucian principles.

He also held an active role within the Hokkien Hoay Kuan (Hokkien Association Taiping) and was also the chairman of the Fujien Association. The members of these organization often tendered to the needs of the early settlers by providing them with essential necessities such as food and lodging until they achieved self-reliance. The Hokkien Hoay Kuan is the second oldest club in Perak and the fifth oldest in Malaysia, with its headquarters situated at No. 290, Jalan Kota, Taiping, Perak.

The Hokkien Hoay Kuan associations primarily catered to the needs and interests of members belonging to the dialect group, who assumed responsibility for the well-being and affairs of their fellow clanspeople who had immigrated from China.

=== Involvement in charitable causes ===
Yok Lin's contributions to various charitable causes included school building funds, art promotions;, efforts to provide relief from various diseases; and other similar causes.

== Snapshot of newspaper article, 1927 (formation of Malayan Broadcasting Service) ==
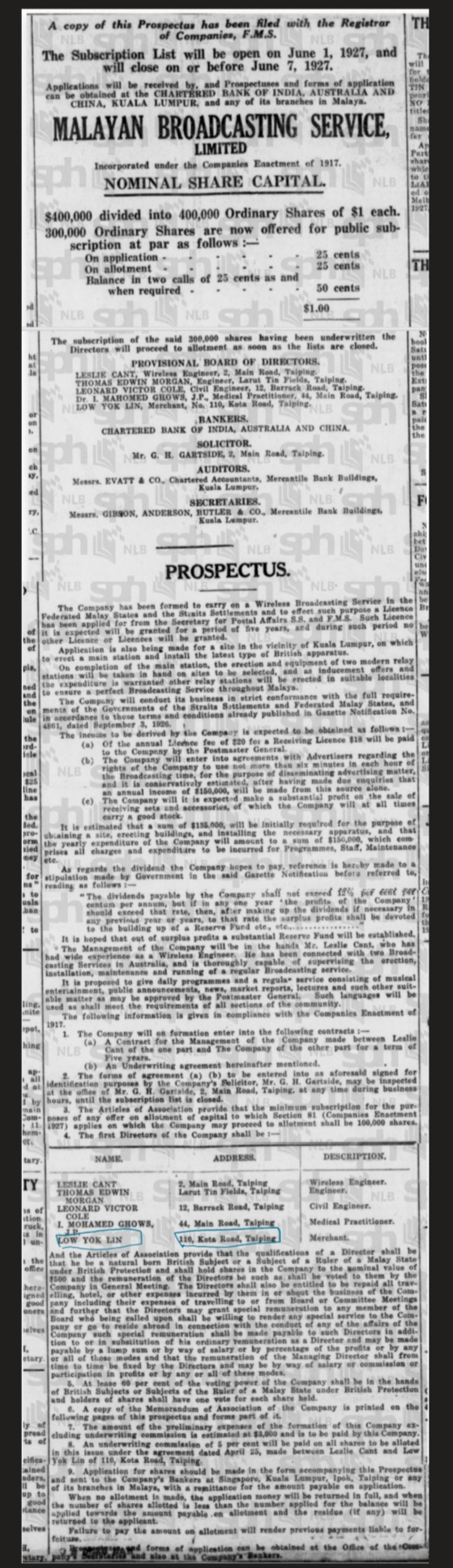

== Major milestone for Radio Malaya, Singapore ==
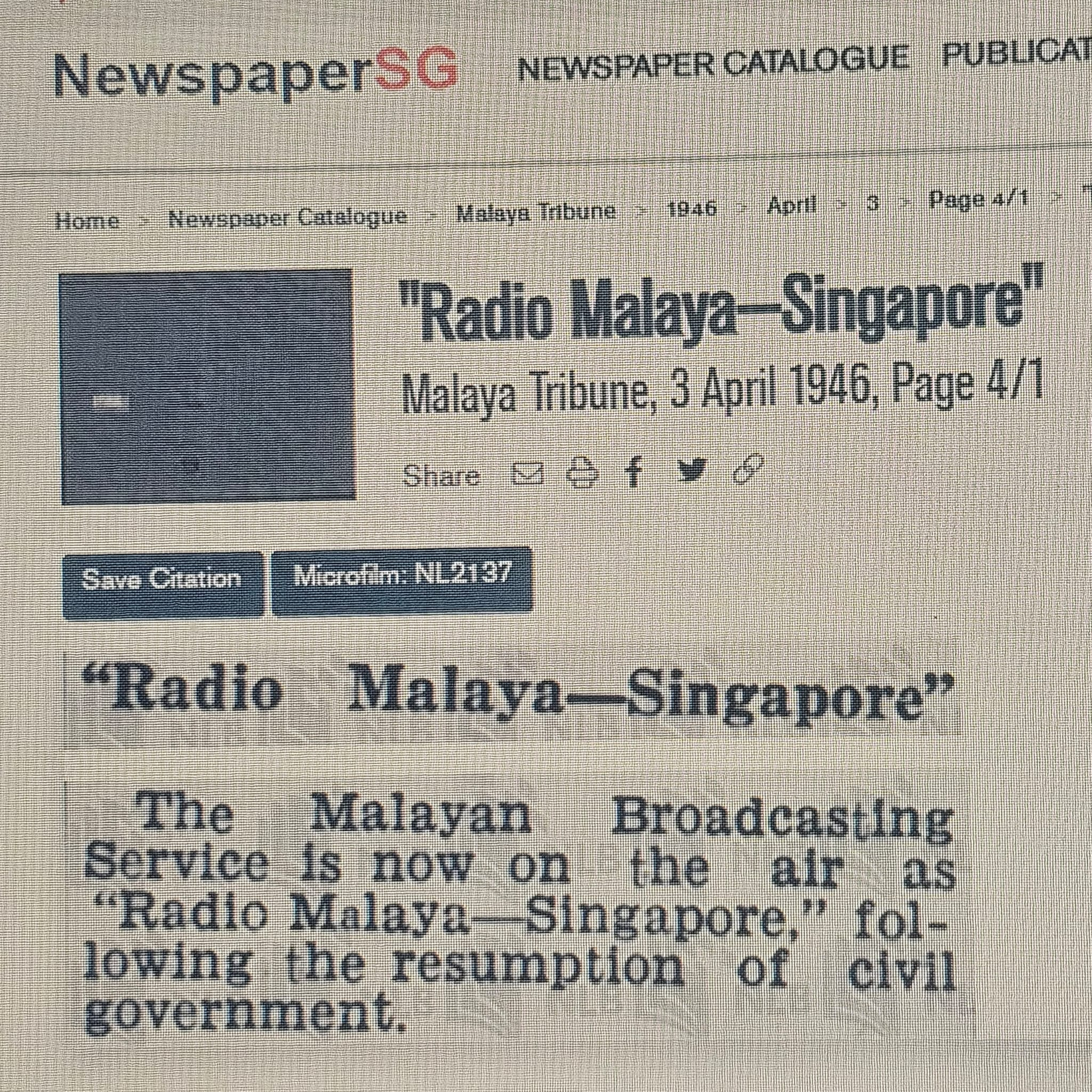
newspaper

== Ex-Chairman of Hua Lian High ==
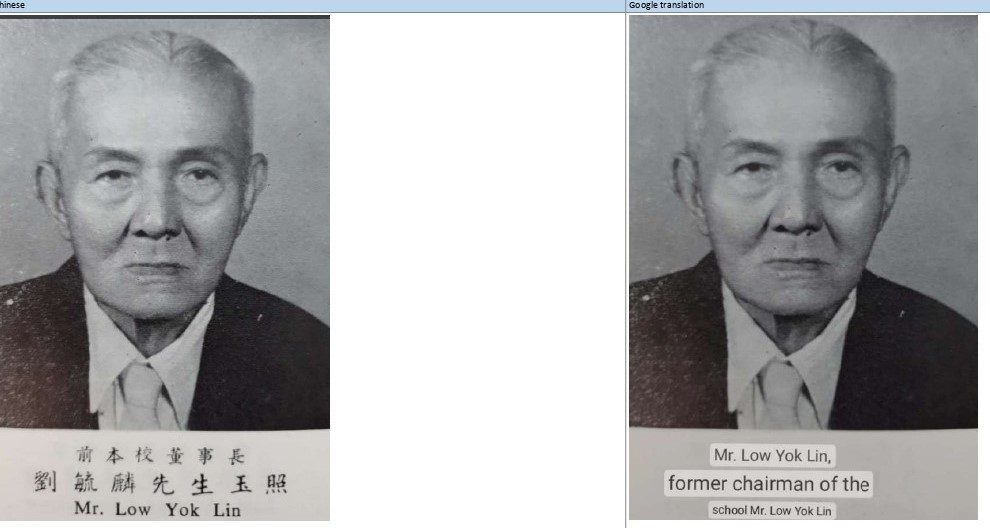
Low Yok Lin
