= Leonard Wray =

British botanist and geologist (1852–1942)

Leonard Wray ISO
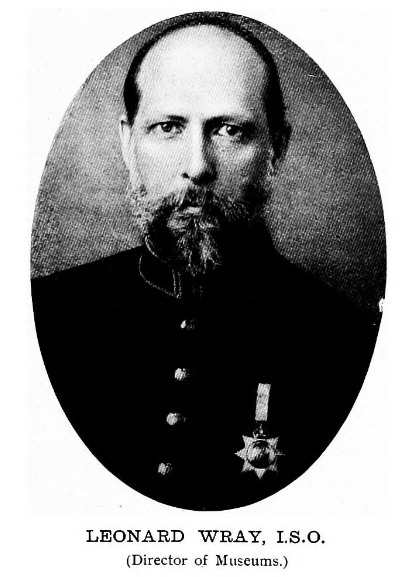
- From a 1908 publication

Leonard Wray ISO (17 September 1852 – 14 March 1942), also known as Leonard Wray Jr., was a botanist and geologist who served as Director of Museums of the Federated Malay States.

== Early life ==
Leonard Wray, who was born on 17 September 1852, was the second son of Leonard Hume Wray, a planter in Perak, Malaya. He was educated privately.

== Career ==
In 1876, he invented a telephone and exhibited it at the Society of Telegraph Engineers and at the Royal Society.

In 1881, he entered the Malay Civil Service as Superintendent of the Government Hill Gardens on Taiping Hill, Larut. In 1883, he was appointed by Sir Hugh Low as the first curator of the newly founded Perak Museum, the first museum to be established in Malaya, remaining in the post for over 20 years. He was an avid explorer and collector of natural and ethnological specimens who contributed much to the knowledge of flora and fauna of the Malaya Peninsula. He collected and prepared the exhibits of Malaya for the Colonial and Indian Exhibition of 1886, and was sent as a commissioner of British Malaya to various international exhibitions on tropical products.

A keen photographer and member of the Royal Photographic Society, he created a large collection of ethnological photographs of aborigines of the Malay Peninsula, particularly the Semang, and contributed scientific papers to various journals including the Journal of the Royal Asiatic Society and the Journal of the Anthropological Institute.

From 1890 to 1900, he served as State Geologist in addition to his other duties. He published "Alluvial Tin Mining" and prepared the design for the first roasting furnace to be built in the Federated Malay States. Its use spread rapidly in the tin mining industry, and large quantities of ore which were previously unusable became of value. In 1898, he was instrumental in getting the export duty on tin ore raised which increased revenues of the government by several millions. In 1896, he was appointed examiner under invention enactments.

In 1904, he was appointed Director of Museums of the Federated Malay States. During the First World War he served as a radiologist in military hospitals, and later worked as a radiographer at Haslemere Hospital.

Wray died on 14 March 1942 following an accident.

== Honours ==
In 1903, he was awarded the Imperial Service Order (ISO).
