= Wesley Methodist Church, Taiping Perak =

Wesley Methodist Church
- Malay: Gereja Methodist Wesley
- Location: 31, Walker Road, 34000 Taiping, Perak
- Country: Malaysia
- Denomination: Methodist

History
- Founded: 6 February 1885

Clergy
- Pastor: Tan Yee Ho

Taiping Wesley Methodist Church is located a church on Walker Road (Jalan Temenggong), Taiping, Malaysia. It is located near the Perak State Museum.

== History ==
The Wesley Methodist Church was formed with a group of youths called "Epworth League." The church was first started to accommodate the increasing number of English-educated Chinese Christian communities in the town and it once sheltered under the same building with the Chinese Methodist Church at Theater Road, Taiping. There is another Methodist church in town, serving Chinese-speaking congregations. The early pastors of the church were Rev. Burr H. Baughman, Rev. Dr. Peterson, Rev. N.G. Manickam, Rev. Eugene O Macgraw and Rev. Kjell Knutsen.

== See also ==
- Methodist Church in Malaysia
