= Perak Pioneer =

19th century English-language newspaper in Perak

- Type: A quarto four-page bi-weekly newspaper in 1894 becoming an eight-page daily in 1904
- Founder: Syed Abul Hassan Ibnay Burhan
- Founded: 1894
- Ceased publication: 1912
- Language: English
- City: Taiping
- Country: Federated Malay States

The Perak Pioneer was an English-language newspaper established in 1894 in Perak by businessman, Syed Abul Hassan Ibnay Burhan. It was one of the earliest English-language newspapers to be published in Malaya, and continued until it ceased publication in 1912.

== History ==
The Perak Pioneer was the one of the earliest English-language newspapers published in the Malaya. It was founded in Taiping, Perak, by Syed Abul Hassan Ibnay Burhan, a businessman and publisher, who had previously established newspapers in Malay and Tamil in the town. The first edition of the newspaper was issued on 4 July 1894 as a quarto four-page bi-weekly.

The original four-page quarto in due course became a four-page folio paper, and in 1901 was converted into a tri-weekly issue which soon expanded into six pages. In 1905, it became an eight-page daily newspaper.

Catering to European government officials, merchants, planters, miners and the business community, and managed by Europeans, the newspaper focused on local Perak affairs and news relating to the Federated Malay States and the Straits Settlements, while also including some world stories gathered from Reuters telegrams.

In 1912, the founder of the newspaper Mr Burhan, in its final edition, confirmed the closure of the newspaper after 18 years, and that all plant had been purchased by a syndicate which intended to replace it.
