= Long Jaafar =

Malay headman and administrator

Che Long Jaafar
- لوڠ جعفر

Menteri Larut
- In office 1850–1857

Personal details
- Born: Perak
- Died: 1857
- Resting place: Kota Long Jaafar
- Spouse: Ngah Pura
- Children: Kulup Seman; Ngah Ibrahim; Che Alang Sepiah

Che Long Jaafar or simply Long Jaafar was a Malay headman who founded and led the administrator of the district of Larut from 1850 to 1857. A known millionaire, he was best known for discovering tin in district of Klian Pauh and Klian Bharu in 1848, other than his other ventures (sugarcane and coffee). At his peak, his wealth were noted to be more than the Sultan of Perak.

== History ==
Long Jaafar was born as a child for Perak aristocrat Dato' Paduka Setia. His other siblings are Che Ngah Lamat and Che Long Halimah. He stay in Larut as his brother married a daughter of Panglima Bukit Gantang.

In 1820, he built a fort called Kota Long Jaafar in Bukit Gantang with his mansion in the middle and a lake in the front. The fort were made from bricks and mud, noted being the first in Perak. The wall of the fort is 2.5 meter high and took fiver years to complete. This is done to and protect himself incase of an attack from Siam In 1826, he build Malay School in Matang, allowing development of formal education in Perak.

In 1840s, he was employed by Panglima Bukit Gantang Seri Amar Diraja to collect taxes at Kerian and Kurau, with Larut in between. According to popular legend, Long Jaafar's pet elephant, Si Larut, went missing in the jungle for three days. When it returned, its legs were covered in mud containing silver-colored ore. Long Jaafar tracked the elephant's path and discovered a massive deposit of tin in an area then known as Klian Pauh (now known as Taiping).

In 1848, Long Jaafar then went to Penang and managed to bring back 20 Chinese men to start the mining activity. The mines opened by Che Long Jaafar in Klian Pauh managed to produce profitable tin. Since then, more Chinese started to flood Larut to work as tin miners.

Eventually in 1850, Larut district was bestowed upon Long Jaafar by Raja Muda Ngah Ali and the Chiefs of Perak: the Temenggong, Panglima Bukit Gantang, Panglima Kinta, Syahbandar and Seri Adika Raja. With this, he effecitively become Menteri (Chiefs) of Larut. Long Jaafar established and developed his administrative centre at Bukit Gantang and made Kuala Sungai Limau at Trong the principal harbour of the Larut Settlement. On 8 November 1856, the reigning Sultan Jaafar reaffirmed the Raja Muda grant.

Some time later, the Sultan of Perak, Sultan Abdullah I, died in 1857 and a series of succession disputes ensued. Unhappy with the abuse and favouritism of various royalties, rival Malay camps took sides with one or the other of the two great Chinese secret societies present in there at the time, (Ghee Hin and Hai San).

== Deceased ==
Long Jaafar died in 1857 and were buried within his fort. He was succeeded by his son Ngah Ibrahim.

== Legacy ==
A school has been named after him in Perak.

- SK Long Jaafar

== See also ==
- Ngah Ibrahim
- Kota Long Jaafar
