= Taiping Clock Tower =

Clock tower in Taiping, Malaysia

Coordinates: 4°51′08″N 100°44′31″E

Taiping Clock Tower Menara Jam Taiping
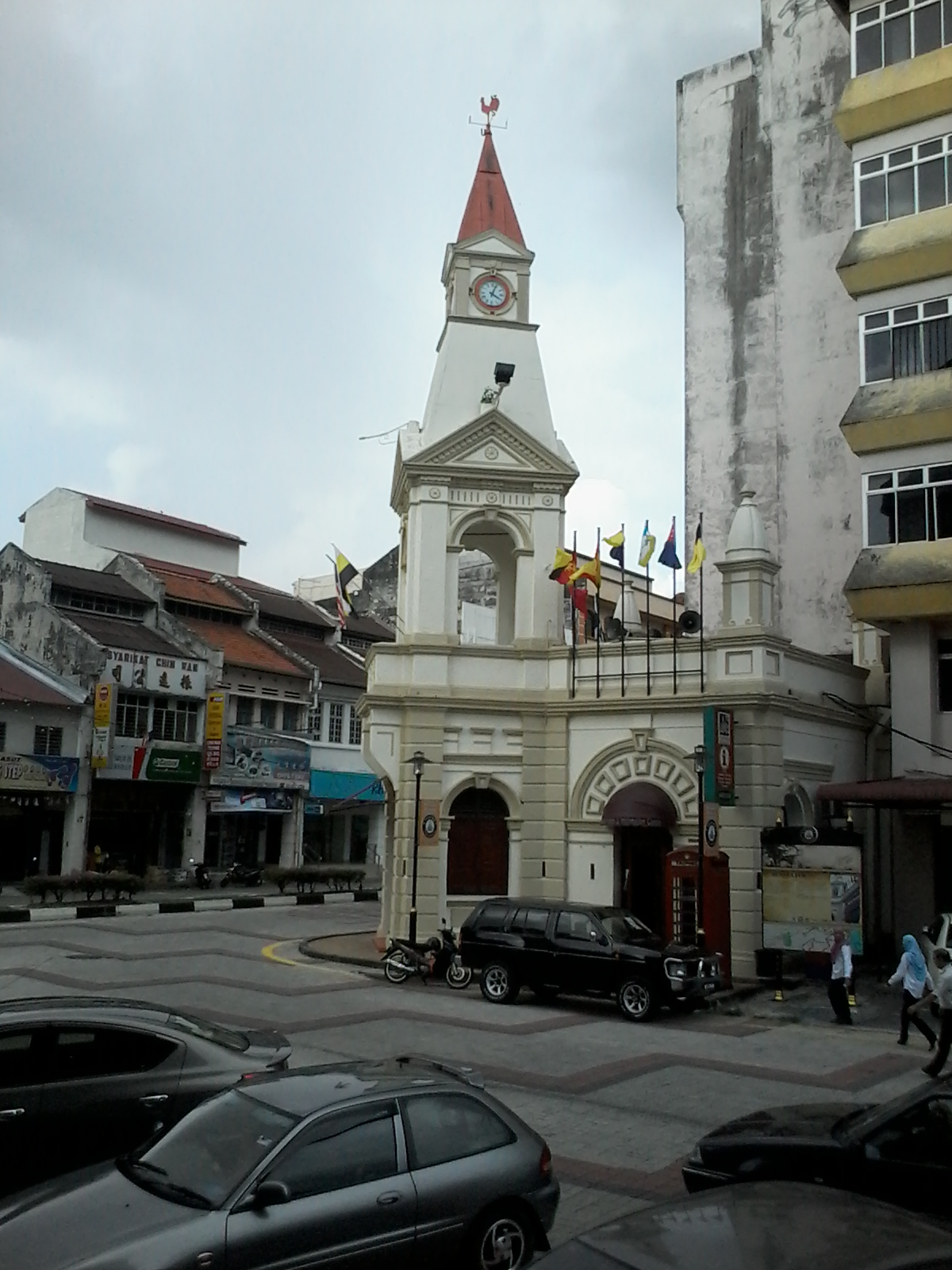
- Interactive map of Taiping Clock Tower; Menara Jam Taiping
- Location: Jalan Kota, Taiping, Perak, Malaysia

History
- Built: 1891

The Taiping Clock Tower (Malay: Menara Jam Taiping) is a clock tower situated in Jalan Kota, Taiping, Perak, Malaysia.

== History ==
The first clock tower on the site was a wooden construction built in 1881 which was replaced in 1891 by a brick building of which only a small section remains today. Known locally as "the Fort", its primary use was as a police station for the British administration although within a few years of its construction it was also used as the town's fire station. After the Second World War it ceased to be used as a police station and remained unoccupied. After undergoing renovation, it is today used as a visitor information centre.

== Description ==
With neoclassical elements included in the design, above the entrance on the first floor is a decorative portico with a pediment surmounted by a spire which houses the four-faced clock.
