= Syed Mokhtar Albukhary =

Malaysian business tycoon (born 1951)

Yang Berbahagia Tan Sri Dato' Seri Syed Mokhtar Albukhary PSM SSDK DCSM PJN DSDK
- Born: Syed Mokhtar Shah bin Syed Nor Albukhary; 12 December 1951 (age 74); Alor Setar, Kedah, Federation of Malaya (present-day Malaysia)
- Occupation: Businessman
- Spouse: Puan Sri Sharifah Zarah Albukhary

Syed Mokhtar Shah bin Syed Nor Albukhary (born 12 December 1951) is a Malaysian business tycoon and philanthropist. Recognised as the 10th richest individual in Malaysia by Forbes in 2026, Syed Mokthar is estimated to have a net worth of US$3.5 billion.

Through holdings such as the MMC Corporation and DRB-HICOM, Syed Mokthar is reported to be the leading figure in Malaysia's rice, sugar, ports, postal, and power generation sectors, and owns the national car company Proton. He is also a key figure in the engineering, construction, and property business. Syed Mokthar is also the largest shareholder in Media Prima, Malaysia's largest media conglomerate, and owns Media Mulia Sdn Bhd, which publishes Utusan Malaysia, the oldest Malay-language daily newspaper in Malaysia.

Syed Mokthar is also the founder of the Albukhary Foundation, an international non-profit charity organization that focuses on social development.

== Early life ==
Syed Mokhtar Albukhary was born on 12 December 1951, the third child of Syed Nor and Sharifah Nor in Kampung Hutan Keriang, Alor Setar, Kedah. His family traces its roots to Hadramawt region of Yemen.

In 1961, Syed Mokhtar moved to Johor Bahru where he spent the next 6 years before returning to Alor Setar where he attended St. Michael's Secondary School. While still schooling, he got involved in his father's cattle business.

Not long after, an outbreak of Foot-and-mouth disease collapsed the company. This led to Syed Mokhtar abandoning his studies a few months prior to completing his Secondary 5, as his family could not afford to pay for his examination fees. With money saved from his involvement in his father's cattle business, Syed Mokhtar began venturing into business on his own.

== Career ==
In the 1970s, Syed Mokthar ventured into rice transportation and secured a rice trading license for his company, Shah Enterprise Sdn Bhd, which allowed him to secure contracts to supply rice to entities such as the Federal Land Development Authority, Majlis Amanah Rakyat, Pernas Edar, and Sergam Bhd, all of which were government-linked agencies. His involvement in rice trading allowed him to make connections with individuals who went on to take up influential political positions, including former prime minister Muhyiddin Yassin and Perlis chief minister Shahidan Kassim.

His business interests eventually expanded to include manufacturing, shipping, property development and agriculture. By the 1990s, he began buying into publicly listed companies and acquiring state-owned enterprises as part of Mahathir Mohamad's privatisation initiatives. The two became close during this period.

In 2001, he acquired a 19.9% stake in MMC Corporation, and took over Pernas International Holdings Berhad, a government-linked company, which was then renamed Tradewinds Corporation. Through the latter company, Syed Mokhtar owns Tradewinds Plantations, which operates 74 rubber estates and 10 palm oil mills, making it one of the largest rubber and palm oil firms in Malaysia, as well as Tradewinds (M) Berhad, which owns Padiberas Nasional Bhd, which has a monopoly on the Malaysian rice industry. Syed Mokthar is rumoured to have had a substantial stake in Padiberas Nasional Bhd since 2005; his penchant for using proxies to hold stakes in companies makes it hard to discern when he bought into the company.

Syed Mokthar's financials suffered during the mid-to-late 2000s, coinciding with Abdullah Ahmad Badawi premiership. The latter had terminated a RM14.5 billion double-track rail installation project by MMC Corporation and shelved a proposal by Syed Mokthar to build a US$2 billion aluminium smelter in Sarawak. His group of companies had also accrued a large debt, estimated to be RM30 billion, much of it linked to the power production company Malakoff Bhd, a subsidiary of MMC Corporation.

MMC Corporation was eventually awarded a contract to lay the northern portion of the double-tracked rail system for RM12.5 billion together with Gamuda.

During the rule of Najib Razak, Syed Mokhtar's DRB-HICOM Defence Technologies was awarded a US$2.5 billion contract to supply DefTech AV8 armoured personnel carriers. The deal attracted some scrutiny, as comparable options were substantially cheaper. Syed Mokhtar was reported to be well-liked by Najib.

By 2014, Syed Mokhtar's DRB-HICOM was the sole owner of the Malaysian national carmaker Proton, and held substantial interests in other non-national car brands, including stakes, distribution rights, and manufacturing arrangements with Honda, Mitsubishi, Volkswagen, Audi, Mercedes-Benz, Suzuki, and Isuzu. DRB-HICOM also continues to hold a controlling stake in Puspakom, which previously held a monopoly on commercial vehicle inspections.

In 2019, Syed Mokhtar became the largest shareholder of Media Prima, the biggest media and entertainment conglomerate in Malaysia, through Aurora Mulia Sdn Bhd, with a 31.22% stake. He also controls Media Mulia Sdn Bhd, which publishes Utusan Malaysia, the country's oldest Malay-language daily.

In May 2020, Malaysia's Ministry of Communications and Multimedia awarded the highly lucrative 5G telecommunications spectrum contract to a company called ALTEL, a subsidiary of Puncak Semangat, a firm primarily controlled by Syed Mokhtar.

He is the minority shareholder of Lotus Cars, with a 49% stake through Etika Automotive, a subsidiary of Etika Strategy, which also holds a smaller 30% stake of Lotus Technology, Lotus' electric vehicle division.

In 2023, Muhyiddin Yassin was charged with abuse of power and money laundering, having allegedly received RM232.5 million from corporate entities. These included Bukhary Equity Sdn Bhd, of which 99% is owned by Syed Mokthar.

== Philanthropy ==
Syed Mokhtar began his philanthropic work in 1976 when he pledged half of his salary to 15 underprivileged families and the other half to his mother and siblings.

In 1996, he founded the Albukhary Foundation, an international non-profit charitable organization headquartered in Malaysia which was founded on the Islamic values of faith (Taqwa) and compassion (Ehsan). The foundation does not discriminate on the grounds of race, nationality, ethnic origin and religion. He remains its primary benefactor.

In 1998, the Islamic Arts Museum Malaysia was founded and is located within Kuala Lumpur's Lake Gardens. It houses more than ten thousand artefacts from across the Muslim world, as well as a library of Islamic art books. The museum has a total of 12 galleries.

The museum has won a number of domestic and international awards and is one of the most visited museums in Malaysia. In 2015, the British Museum announced the opening of a new gallery to redisplay all the collections of the Islamic world. The gallery would be known as The Albukhary Foundation Gallery of the Islamic World.

In 2005, the Albukhary Scholarship Program was founded to support economically disadvantaged students internationally. The scholarships are offered to students of the Prince's School of Traditional Arts, Oxford University, IBN Haldun University, University of York, Philanthropy University and 17 universities in Malaysia, including Albukhary International University. The program offers five types of scholarships, the Albukhary Equity Scholarship, Regional Awards, Leadership, Academic & Service Excellence Awards, Campus Residence Grant, and the Refugee Education Dream (RED) Scholarship which is available to all refugees and asylum seekers registered with UNHCR Malaysia.

In 2010, the Albukhary International University was founded and located within the Sharifah Rokiah Centre of Excellence. The university is housed within a purpose built campus and is spread over 30 hectares (74 acres) in Alor Setar.

As of 2013 his donations have exceeded $500 million. In 2014 he was recognized by Forbes Asia as a Hero of Philanthropy due to his contribution to refugees in Pakistan, orphans in Guinea and disaster victims in China, Indonesia and Iran.

== Honours ==
- Malaysia
  - Commander of the Order of Meritorious Service (PJN) – Datuk (1997)
  - Commander of the Order of Loyalty to the Crown of Malaysia (PSM) – Tan Sri (2000)
- Kedah
  - Knight Grand Companion of the Order of Loyalty to the Royal House of Kedah (SSDK) – Dato' Seri (2008)
  - Knight Companion of the Order of Loyalty to the Royal House of Kedah (DSDK) – Dato' (1999)
- Malacca
  - Knight Commander of the Exalted Order of Malacca (DCSM) – Datuk Wira (2010)
