= Kamunting =

Town in Larut, Matang and Selama, Perak, Malaysia

Kamunting Kelian Bahru
- Suburb of Taiping

Other transcription(s)
  - Jawi: كامونتيڠ
  - Chinese: 甘文丁
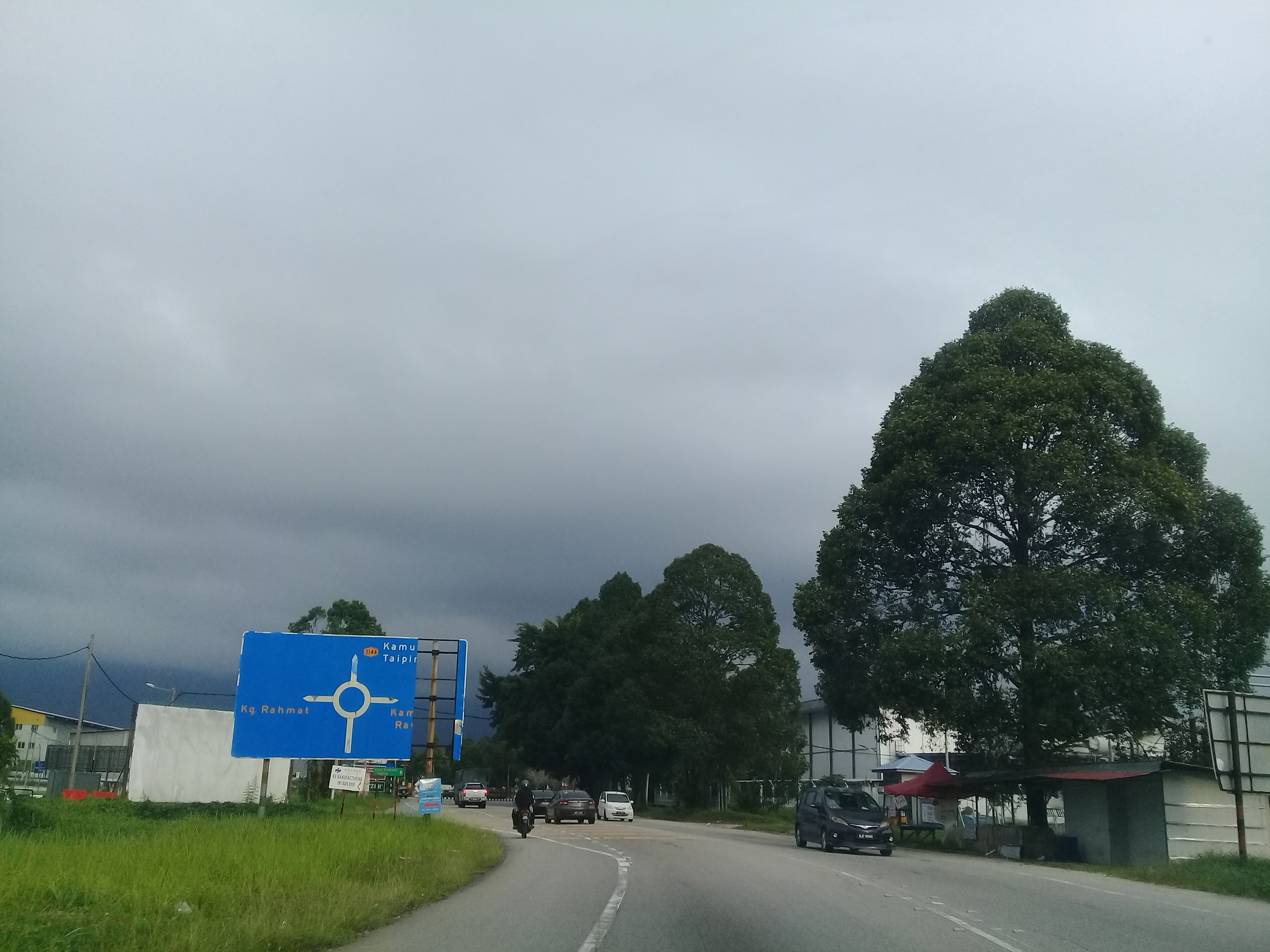
- Kamunting Industrial Park road.
- Nicknames: "The Satellite Town", "The Industrial Town in Taiping", "Malay Town"
- Motto(s): Perpaduan Menjana Kemakmuran (ڤرڤادوان منجان کمعمورن) (Unity Generate Prosperity)
- Location of Kamunting in Perak Kamunting (Malaysia)
- Coordinates: 4°53′N 100°44′E
- Country: Malaysia
- State: Perak
- District: Larut, Matang & Selama
- Established: 1876 (as Kelian Bahru)
- Founder: Datuk Paduka Setia Long Jaafar Abdul Latif

Government
  - Type: Municipality
  - District Officer (Taiping): Harun Bin Rawi
  - Mayor (Taiping): Tuan Omor Bin Saad
  - Member of Parliament: YB Datuk Mohammad Zahir bin Abdul Khalid (BN)
  - Council: Taiping Municipal Council

Population (2010)
  - Total: 36,243
- Postal code: 346xx
- Area code: 05
- Vehicle registration: A
- Website: www.mptaiping.gov.my

Kamunting (Malay pronunciation: /Kemunting/) is a town in Larut, Matang and Selama District, Perak, Malaysia. It is the biggest satellite town of Taiping.

During the Malayan Emergency between 1948 and 1960, Kamunting was the site of a major British/Commonwealth military base, there being a large garrison for the 28th Commonwealth Independent Infantry Brigade and also one of the three British Military Hospitals (BMHs) in Malaya. Between Taiping and Kamunting is one of the main Military Cemeteries in Malaya. Over the many years of the conflict against the Communist terrorists, thousands of British, Australian, New Zealand, Fijian and Gurkha troops lived - and died - in and around Kamunting and Taiping.

Kamunting houses the main bus station (Kamunting Raya) for Taiping town. Soon the Taiping train station will relocate there too. It has a weekly night market every Saturday night near the bus station that sells all sorts of local fresh produce and food stuffs. There are also fruit sellers along the road leading to the Kamunting bus stops which sell seasonal fruits like durian and mangosteens. It also connects Taiping to the North–South Expressway via the northern exit.

Major tourist spot is Bukit Jana, which has a waterfall and streams off the range of Bukit Larut. The Bukit Jana Golf & Country Club is also situated nearby. Plans for Taiping sports centre, which includes a 15000-seater stadium, indoor venues and extreme sports site, are still under consideration.

== History ==
Long Jaafar bin Abdul Latif (Datuk Paduka Setia) is synonymous with the early history of the town of Taiping and Kamunting. In his youth, Long Jaafar had to go to Bukit Gantang which was under control in-law, Alang Alaiddin (Datuk Panglima Bukit Gantang). In that time, this area is still wilderness. One day, Long Jaafar was bathing in a river . He found a sand which is black and contains bijih timah. So, he was interested in commercializing tin mining until large. The place who first found bijih timah is named Kelian Pauh (now the vicinity of Taiping Prison) . Kelian mean mine or mines, while Pauh is a tiny mango fruit. Kelian Pauh is the old name for the town of Taiping. In 1840, Long Jaafar has brought in three people of Chinese miners to start mining work in Kelian Pauh (Taiping). In addition, the Malay population in the area was also mine but only in the summer and during the rainy season, they carry out work on the smelting of bijih timah. With Chinese aid, bijih timah production increased. According to records, in 1844, the tin from this area have been exported to Penang. In 1848, Long Jaafar has brought in 20 people of Penang Chinese workers to work and open mines in the area. One day, his pet elephant used to transport bijih timah have missed and fled into the woods. During the three days, elephant which is named Larut went missing because wallowing in a swamp, in the jungle not far from the residence of Long Jaafar. After Larut (the elephant) recaptured, it was found that elephant legs and body are filled with black sludge that containing sand of bijih timah. Finally, Long Jaafar has found another new place rich in bijih timah. That place was named Kelian Bahru which means new mine. Kelian Bahru is the old name for the Kamunting. While there are areas in Kelian Pauh and Kelian Bahru and surrounding areas named Larut, taken from the name of the elephant who discovers the tin mine. Kelian Bahru (Kamunting) opened after bijih timah found in this area. Groups that occupy this area is Hakka tribe who called Fui Chew. There is also a group known as Hakka Chinese Macao stay here. While in Kelian Pauh (Taiping), mines operated by Chinese Hakka, Chen Sang. At this time most of the Malays occupy Bukit Gantang and Trong. In the 1850s, the number of Chinese miners here amounted to 5,000 and increased to 35,000–40,000 people by the 1870s. Early 1860s, the number of Chinese residents in Kelian Pauh is of 4,000 people. There are about 100 pieces of row houses, between 70 and 80 houses belonging to Chen Sang and seven houses belong Fui Chew. 3000 inhabitants were miners and farmers. 20 mines in Kelian Pauh owned by Chen Yao and the other three are owned by the Hakka Fui Chew. Chinese residents in Kelian Bahru amounting to approximately 2,200 people. They occupy between 40 and 50 row houses shared. 2,000 inhabitants were miners and the remainder were vegetable farmers. 16 mines in Kelian Bahru dominated by Hakka Fui Chew and three mines belonging to the Hakka Chen Sang.

== History ==
Kampung Baru Kamunting was founded over 80 years ago. According to Mr. Tan, the village headman, it is the smallest new village among all the new villages in Malaysia. During the last 10 to 15 years, the government has given subsidies for local infrastructure. The houses in Kampung Baru Kamunting are mostly made of wood and scattered around the village randomly. The common modes of transport are motorcycles and cars. The nearest town is Taiping which is 5 km away from the village. The local authority is Majlis Perbandaran Taiping. Today the population of the village is about 3,000. Many youth from Kampung Baru Kamunting have left for better job opportunities elsewhere. Most of the residents are young children and older folks or the “evergreens”.

== Population ==
Demographics of Kamunting
Ethnic Groups	Percentage
Malays	55.503%
Chinese	25.872%
Indians	14.082%
Non-citizens	1.448%
Others	0.320%

- Population = 36,243

The residents of Kamunting are mostly Malays. The Perak dialect is the language of instruction for the Malays in Kamunting.

Kamunting which is still one of the largest industrial city in Malaysia is also a city known for its satellites. Population statistics are shown right.

The following is based on Department of Statistics Malaysia 2010 census.

== Tourist Destination ==
- Bukit Jana Waterfall
- Pasar Minggu Kamunting Lama
