= Gas Malaysia =

Malaysian natural gas company

Gas Malaysia Berhad
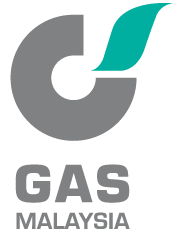
- Company type: Public limited company
- Traded as: MYX: 5209
- ISIN: MYL5209OO001
- Founded: 1992
- Headquarters: Shah Alam, Malaysia
- Key people: Azli Mohamed, PGCEO
- Parent: MMC Corporation Berhad (30.9%); Tokyo Gas Mitsui (18.5%); Petronas Gas (14.8%); Public (35.8%)
- Website: www.gasmalaysia.com

Gas Malaysia Berhad (doing business as Gas Malaysia; MYX: 5209) is a natural gas distribution company in Malaysia. The company headquarters is located in Shah Alam. It has three regional offices, located in Prai, Gebeng and Pasir Gudang, and seven branch offices located throughout Peninsular Malaysia.

== History ==
Gas Malaysia Berhad was established on 16 May 1992 to sell, market and distribute natural gas as well as to develop, operate and maintain the Natural Gas Distribution System (“NGDS”) network within Peninsular Malaysia. In December 2000, Gas Malaysia expanded its business to include the reticulated liquefied petroleum gas.

== Operations ==
As of July 2005, the company had 452 industrial customers, more than 600 commercial customers and over 3,000 residential customers.

As of February 2011, Gas Malaysia had 33,707 residential and commercial customers as well as 691 industrial customers. In 2010, total gas sold by Gas Malaysia was 117.8 million British thermal units throughout Peninsular Malaysia. As of February 2011, its network of gas pipelines covered a total of 1,726.6 kilometres (1,072.9 mi).

== Shareholders ==
55% of the company shares is held by MMC-Shapadu Holdings, 25% by Tokyo Gas - Mitsui Holdings and 20% by Petronas Gas Berhad.

== See also ==
- Peninsula Gas Utilisation
