= Terong =

Mukim in Larut, Matang and Selama District, Perak, Malaysia

Coordinates: 4°43′N 100°44′E

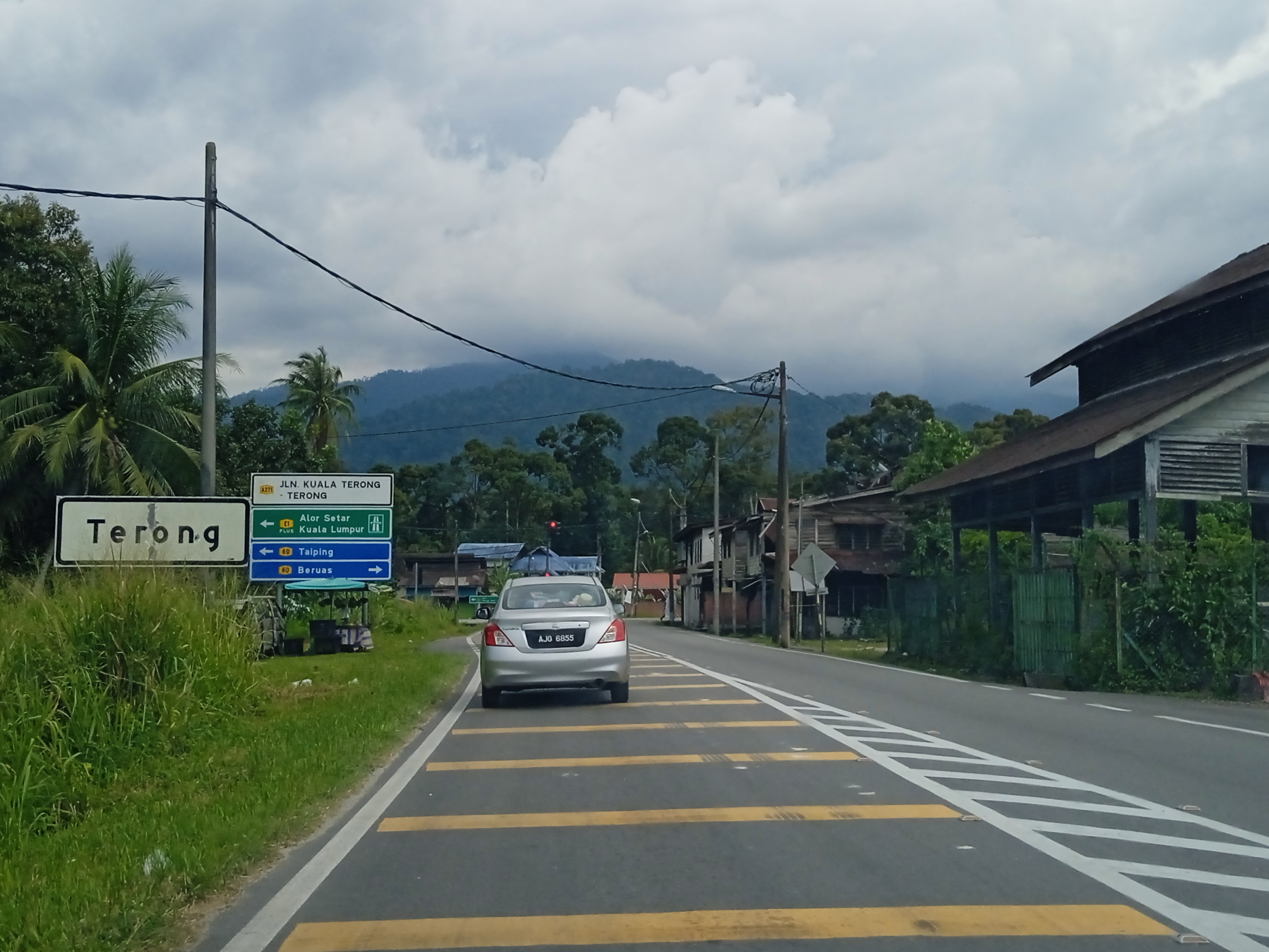
Terong

Terong, also spelled Trong, is a mukim in Larut, Matang and Selama District, Perak, Malaysia.

Situated on the western foothills of the Bintang Mountains, Terong is famous for the quality of its water and the presence of a waterfall. Tin was also mined there until 1980. It had Malay, Chinese and Tamil primary schools but the numbers have dwindled considerably.

The village is surrounded by plantations of rubber and oil palm plantations. Many quaint shops exist in the village centre.

== Notable natives ==
- Yusof Ishak (1910–1970), first president of Singapore.
