= Kuala Sepetang =

Coordinates: 4°50′17.2″N 100°37′50.9″E

Other transcription(s)
  - Jawi: كوالا سيڤيتڠ
  - Chinese: 十八丁 (Simplified)
  - Japanese: クアラ·セぺタン
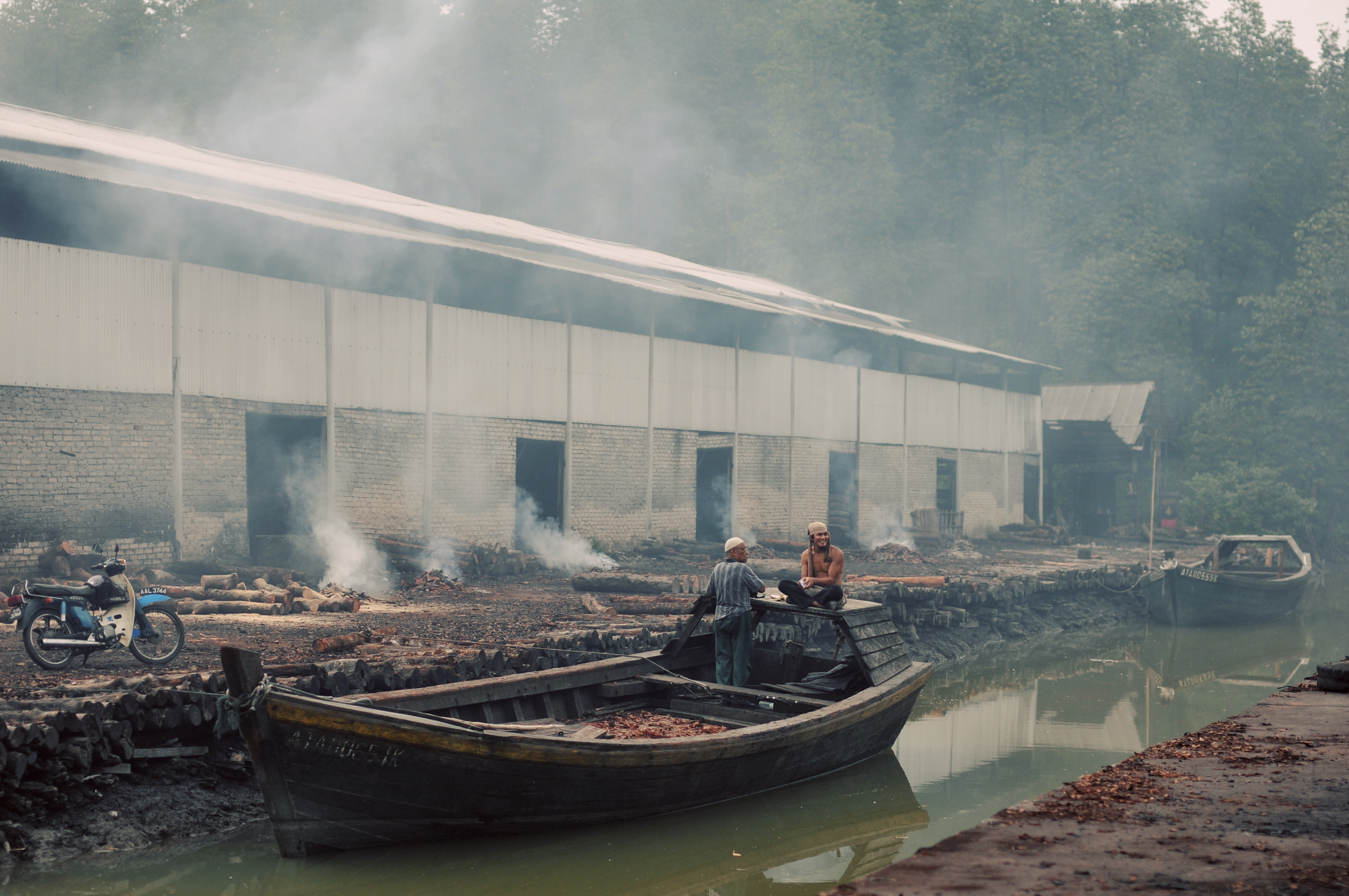
- Charcoal factory, Kuala Sepetang.
- Interactive map of Kuala Sepetang
- Country: Malaysia
- State: Perak
- District: Larut, Matang and Selama
- Time zone: UTC+8 (MST)
  - Summer (DST): Not applicable
- Postcode: 34650

Kuala Sepetang (Jawi: كوالا سيڤيتڠ; Chinese: 十八丁) is a coastal town located in Larut, Matang and Selama District in northwestern Perak, Malaysia. It is also popularly known by English-speaking locals by its colonial name Port Weld (Chinese: Chinese: 砵威) after a former Governor, Frederick Weld.

It is a thriving fishing village, and the main jumping-off point to the river mouth community of Kuala Sangga, which is a Chinese fishing community at the river mouth which specializes in fish breeding in cages, more formerly known as cage culture.

== Railway station ==
Port Weld is notable for being the terminal station of the first ever railway line to be built in what is today Malaysia. The Port Weld railway station was located at the centre of town. The whole railway line from here to Taiping was dismantled in the 1980s, and now only the ticketing booth and the multilingual Port Weld railway signboard remain. The ticketing booth is now a Chinese coffee shop, and the shopowner has been maintaining the railway signboard.

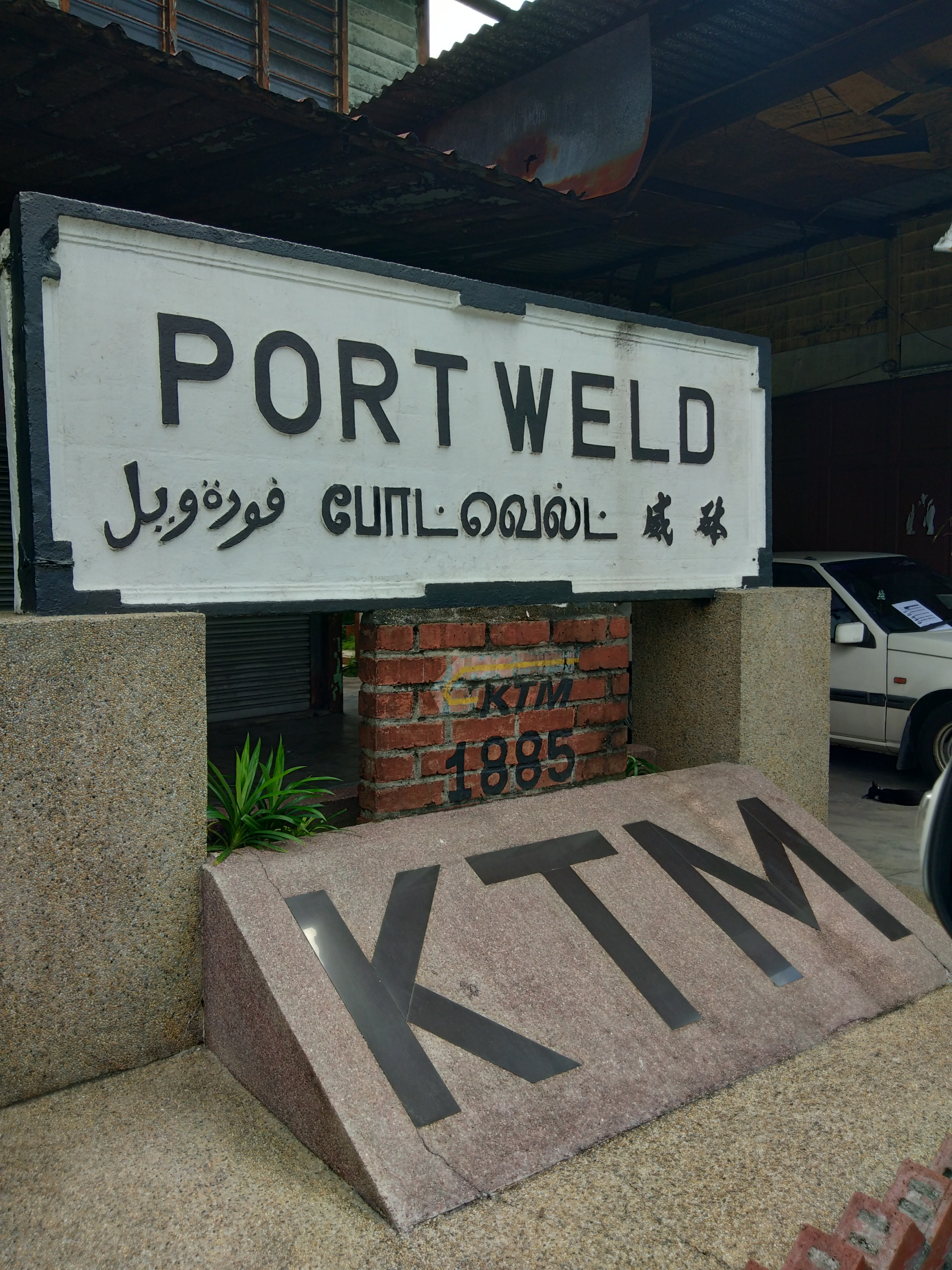

== Food ==
Kuala Sepetang is well known for its seafood due to its proximity to the Straits of Malacca, and it has a restaurant situated on the upper floor of a shop lot overlooking the river. Kuala Sepetang is also well known for its mangrove swamp reserve park, the Matang Mangrove Forest Reserve, which is open to the public daily. A boardwalk was built over the swamp for tourists access, as well as chalets in which tourists can rent to stay the night on the riverfront. Kuala Sepetang is also famous for charcoal production using sustainably farmed mangroves and traditional kilns, some of which are open for tourist visits. Besides fishing villages, charcoal kilns and mangroves to enjoy, one can take a boat tour along the mangrove river to see fireflies at night and eagles.

The village is very popular with its Curry Mee (Only sold at afternoon time) and Pau.

Kuala Sepetang is also famous for Prawn Noodle, also known as Mee Udang Banjir, sold by many Malay stalls.

== Trivia ==
Kuala Sepetang's old name, Port Weld, was named after Frederick Weld who was Governor of the Straits Settlements when the railway opened in 1885.

One of the main thoroughfares in Port Weld is Jalan Trump or Trump Road. While it has no known connection to incumbent US President Trump, by coincidence, President Trump's grandfather was also named Frederick.
