= Perak Museum =

Museum in Larut, Matang and Selama, Perak, Malaysia

- Muzium Perak
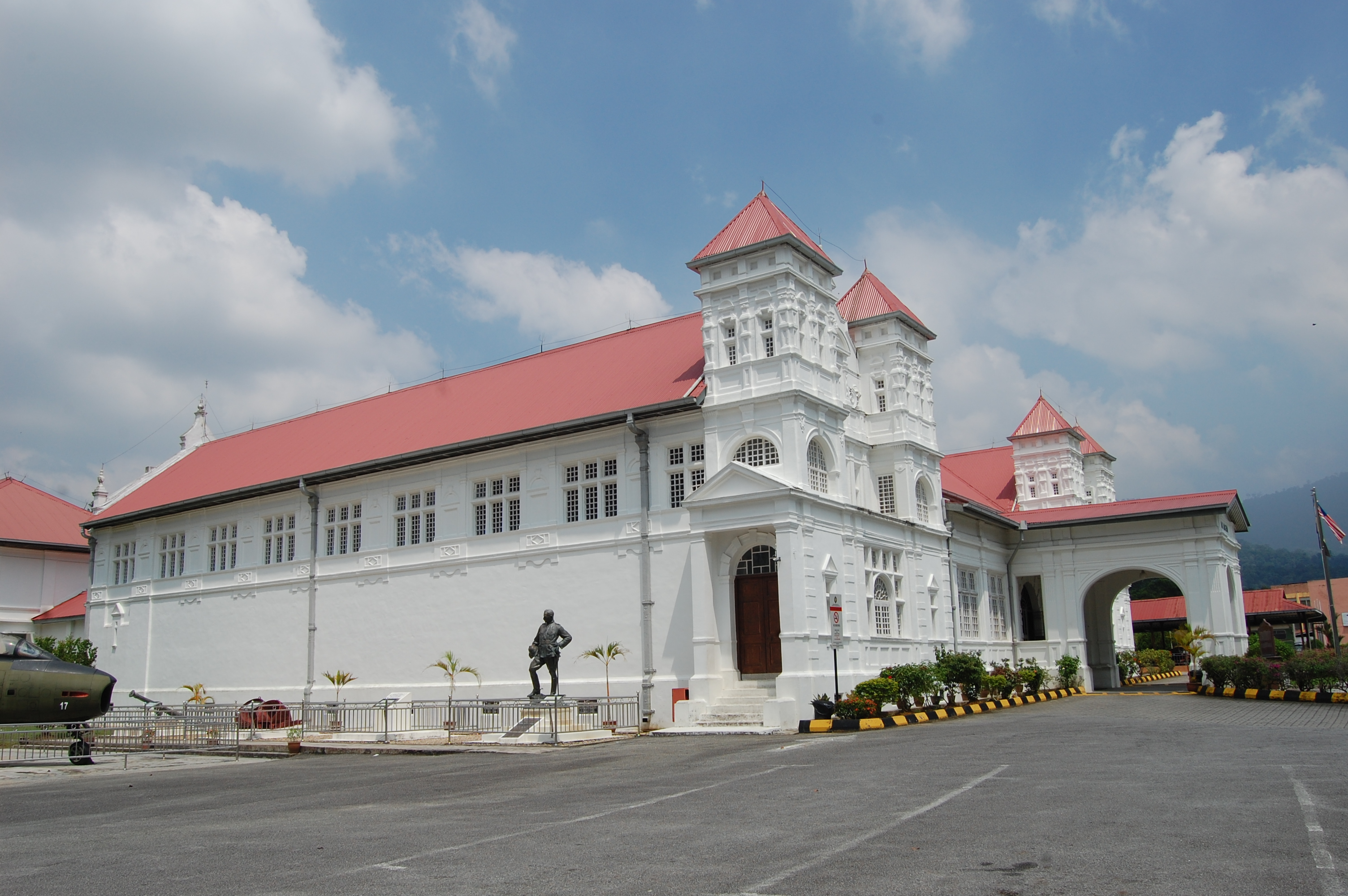

- Malaysia
- Established: 1883
- Location: Taiping, Perak, Malaysia
- Coordinates: 4.860556°N 100.745°E

The Perak Museum (Malay: Muzium Perak) is a public museum located at the junction of Jalan Muzium (Museum Road) and Jalan Taming Sari (Main Road) in Taiping, Perak, Malaysia. It is the oldest museum in Malaysia and highlights the history of the state.

== History ==
The Perak Museum in Taiping is the first and oldest museum in Malaysia. It was founded in 1883 by Sir Hugh Low, the fourth British Resident of Perak (1877 to 1889). It owes its establishment to the fund-raising efforts of Sir Hugh Low and Sir Frank Swettenham, Resident of Perak from 1889 to 1895, Resident-General of the Federated Malay States (now Malaysia) in 1896–1901, and Governor and Commander-in-Chief of the Straits Settlements 1901–1904.

The museum was initially concerned with natural history particularly ethnography, zoology, botany and geology, all key areas of interest of its founder Sir Hugh Low. Its first curator was Mr. Leonard Wray Jr., a botanist, geologist and Superintendent of Government Hill at Larut (1883 to 1903).

In the beginning, the museum was housed in some renovated government offices while the main building of Neo-classical design was under construction in 1883. The building comprised an office, library and exhibition hall (Gallery A) and was only completed in 1886 due to lack of funds. In 1889, extensions to the museum's front and back were added. A new exhibition hall (Gallery B) was constructed in 1891 to 1893. As the collection of exhibits grew, a new two-storey building (Gallery C and D) were added from 1900 to 1903.

This museum should not be confused with The Perak Museum in Ipoh erected in 1926 by a rich and successful tin miner called Foo Choong Kit.

== See also ==
- List of museums in Malaysia
- List of tourist attractions in Perak
