= MMC Corporation =

Malaysian utility and infrastructure company

MMC Corporation Berhad

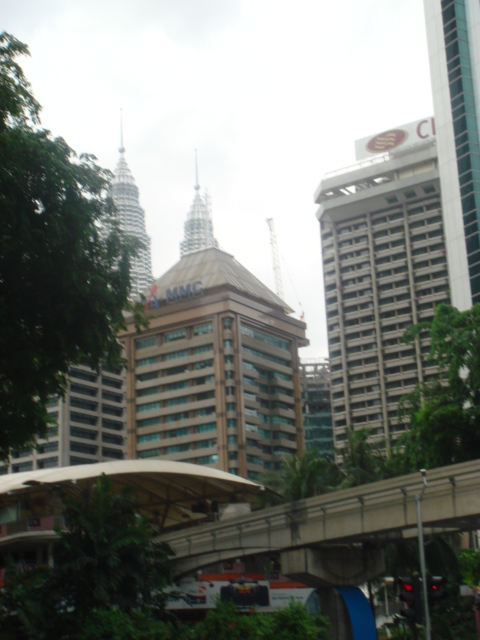
- MMC Corporation headquarters in Kuala Lumpur.
- Formerly: Malaysia Mining Corporation Berhad
- Company type: Public limited company
- Traded as: MYX: 2194
- ISIN: MYL2194OO008
- Founded: 1911; 115 years ago
- Headquarters: Ground Floor, Wisma Budiman, Persiaran Raja Chulan, 50200 Kuala Lumpur, Malaysia
- Key people: Shamsul Azhar Abbas, Chairman; Che Khalib Mohamad Noh, Group Managing Director
- Revenue: ▲RM 4.984 billion (2018)
- Net income: ▲RM 38.94 million (2018)
- Total assets: ▲RM 25.305 billion (2018)
- Total equity: ▲RM 10.223 billion (2018)
- Owner: Syed Mokhtar Albukhary (51%)
- Subsidiaries: NCB Holdings
- Website: www.mmc.com.my

MMC Corporation Berhad (abbreviated as MMC; MYX: 2194) is a Malaysian utility and infrastructure conglomerate, with diversified businesses under three divisions: Energy & Utilities, Ports & Logistics, and Engineering. Syed Mokhtar Albukhary is the company's biggest shareholder at 51%, while several government-linked investment companies own over 30%.

MMC's key businesses in its Ports & Logistics division. MMC Ports is currently one of the 10 largest port operators in the world with a total throughput of 15.8 mil TEUs in 2018. MMC Ports includes the Port of Tanjung Pelepas, Johor Port, Penang Port, Northport and Tanjung Bruas Port. MMC also has an associate stake in Red Sea Gateway Terminal Company Limited, which operates a container terminal at Jeddah Islamic Port, Kingdom of Saudi Arabia. Additionally, MMC operates Senai Airport, the only airport not under Malaysia Airport Holdings Berhad's portfolio.

Under its Energy & Utilities division, MMC has a controlling stake in Malakoff Corporation Berhad, Malaysia's largest independent power producer. It is the single largest shareholder of Gas Malaysia Berhad, the sole supplier of reticulated natural gas in Peninsular Malaysia, and it wholly owns Aliran Ihsan Resources Berhad, a water solutions provider, also owned by MMC.

MMC's Engineering division has a leading role as the Project Delivery Partner and underground works package contractor for the 51 km (32 mi) Sungai Buloh-Kajang Line of the Klang Valley Mass Rapid Transit (KVMRT) project. MMC-Gamuda built the Bukit Berapit Rail Tunnel, Southeast Asia's longest rail tunnel, as part of the 329 km (204 mi) Ipoh-Padang Besar Electrified Double Tracking Project and the Stormwater Management and Road Tunnel (SMART) motorway, the first-of-its-kind dual-purpose tunnel in the world.

MMC is the first and oldest construction company in Malaysia as it dates back more than 100 years ago.

== Subsidiaries ==
=== Ports & Logistics ===
- MMC Port Holdings Sdn Bhd (100%)
- Pelabuhan Tanjung Pelepas Sdn Bhd (70%)
- Johor Port Berhad (100%)
- Northport (Malaysia) Bhd (100%)
- Penang Port Sdn Bhd (100%)
- Tanjung Bruas Port Sdn Bhd (70%)
- SPT Services Sdn Bhd (70%)
- Red Sea Gateway Terminal Company Ltd (20%)
- JP Logistics Sdn Bhd (100%)
- Kontena Nasional Berhad (100%)
- KTMB MMC Cargo Sdn Bhd (49%)
- Senai Airport Terminal Services Sdn Bhd (100%)

=== Energy & Utilities ===
- Gas Malaysia Berhad (30.9%)
- Malakoff Corporation Berhad (37.6%)
- Aliran Ihsan Resources Berhad (100%)

=== Engineering ===
- MMC Engineering Sdn Bhd (100%)
- MMC Pembetungan Langat Sdn Bhd (100%)
- MMC Oil & Gas Engineering Sdn Bhd (100%)
- MMC Gamuda
  - MMC Gamuda Joint Venture Sdn Bhd (50%)
  - MMC Gamuda KVMRT (PDP) Sdn Bhd (50%)
  - MMC Gamuda KVMRT (PDP SSP) Sdn Bhd (50%)
  - MMC Gamuda KVMRT (T) Sdn Bhd (50%)
- UEM-MMC Joint Venture Sdn Bhd (50%)
- Syarikat Mengurus Air Banjir dan Terowong Sdn Bhd (SMART) (50%)

=== Industrial Development ===
- Senai Airport City Sdn Bhd (100%)
- Seaport Worldwide Sdn Bhd (100%)
- Northern Technocity Sdn Bhd (100%)
