= Taiping, Perak =

Taiping Kelian Pauh
- City and district capital
- Taiping City; Bandar Taiping

Other transcription(s)
  - Jawi: تايڤيڠ
  - Chinese: 太平 (Simplified) 太平 (Traditional); Tàipíng (Hanyu Pinyin); Thài-pêng (Penang Hokkien)
  - Tamil: தைப்பிங் Taippiṅ (Transliteration)
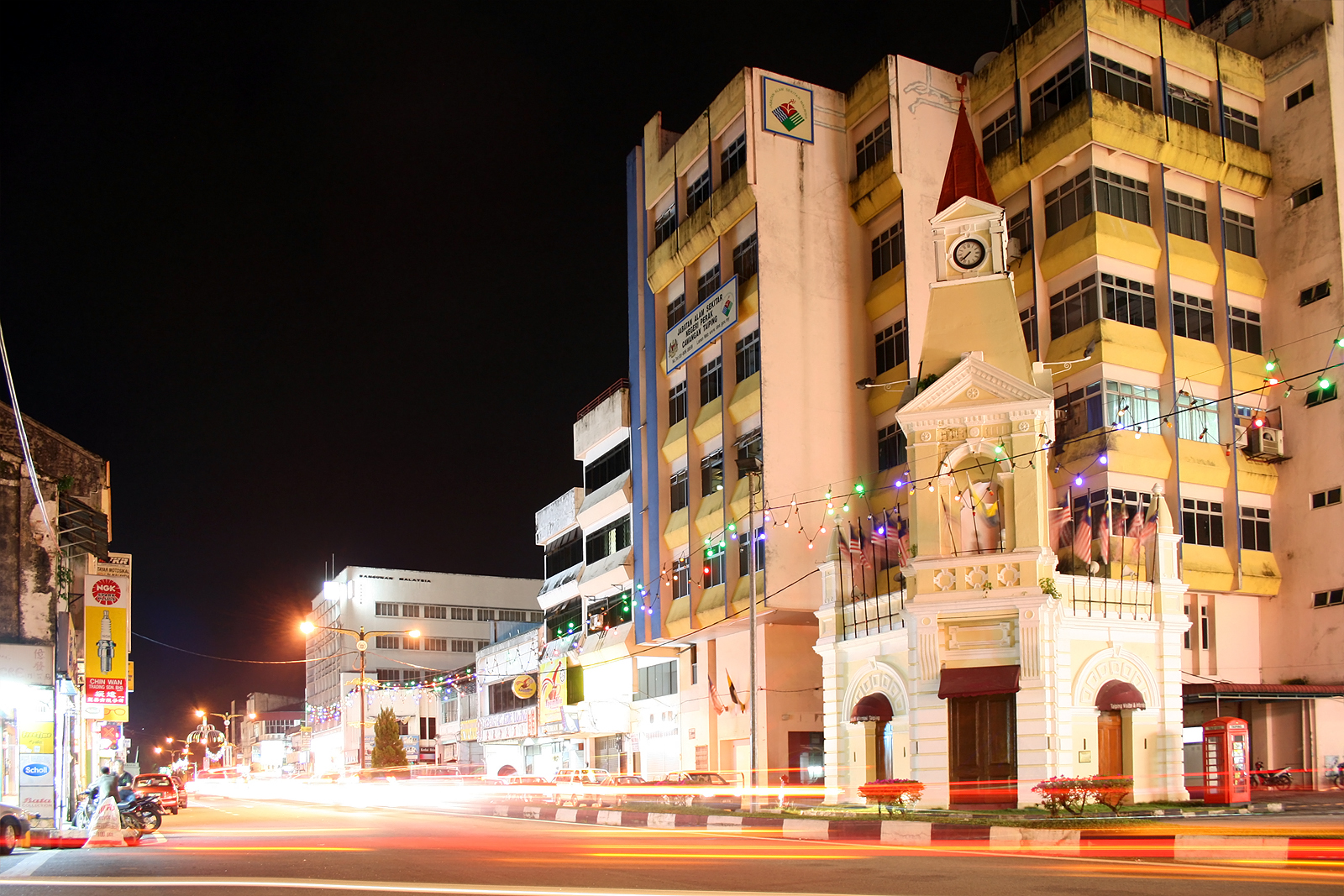
- Kota Road at night

- Seal
- Nicknames: The Rain City, The Heritage City
- Motto(s): Aman Selama-lamanya (English trans.: Everlasting Peace)
- Interactive map of Taiping
- Coordinates: 4°51′N 100°44′E
- Country: Malaysia
- State: Perak
- District: Larut, Matang and Selama District
- Established: 1874
- Founder: Long Jaafar

Government
  - Type: Local government
  - Body: Taiping Municipal Council
  - Mayor: Khairul Amir Mohamad Zubir

Area
  - Total: 186.46 km^{2} (71.99 sq mi)

Population (2013)
  - Total: 245,182
  - Density: 1,315/km^{2} (3,410/sq mi)
- Time zone: UTC+8 (MST)
- Postal code: 34xxx
- Area code: 05
- Vehicle registration: A
- Website: www.mptaiping.gov.my

Taiping (Malay: [taipeŋ]) is a city located in Larut, Matang and Selama District, in the state of Perak, Malaysia. It is located approximately 48 km (30 mi) northwest of Ipoh, the capital of Perak, and 78 km (48 mi) southeast of George Town, Penang. With a population of 245,182 (in 2013), it is the second largest city in Perak after Ipoh, the state capital.

Taiping took over Kuala Kangsar's role as the state capital from 1876 to 1937, but was then replaced by Ipoh. Its growth slowed after that, but in recent years the town has been developing rapidly again. Perak State Museum is located in the town.

Taiping also receives some limelight for being the wettest town in Peninsular Malaysia. Its average annual rainfall of about 2757mm of precipitation has led to fertile flora and rain trees in the Taiping Lake Gardens.

Taiping was ranked in the Top 3 Sustainable Cities in the world.

== History ==
The area developed quickly in the 19th century when tin was discovered by Long Jaafar. The mines attracted large numbers of settlers, particularly Chinese. Feuds began between the different groups of Chinese immigrants and became so bitter that in the early 1870s, the British intervened and assumed control of the town. Taiping was the capital for the districts of Larut, Matang and Selama in Perak. Before 1937, Taiping was the capital of the state of Perak and the centre of a long and drawn out war resulting in a change of rulership for the state. Taiping used to be known as Klian Pauh – Klian meaning mine while Pauh is a type of small mango.

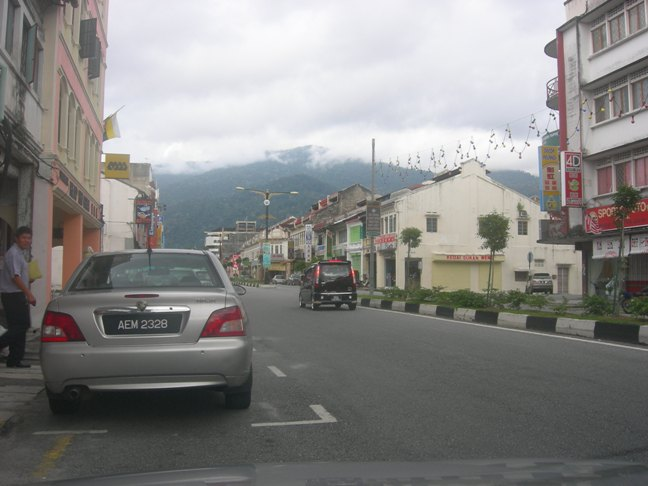
Taiping town.

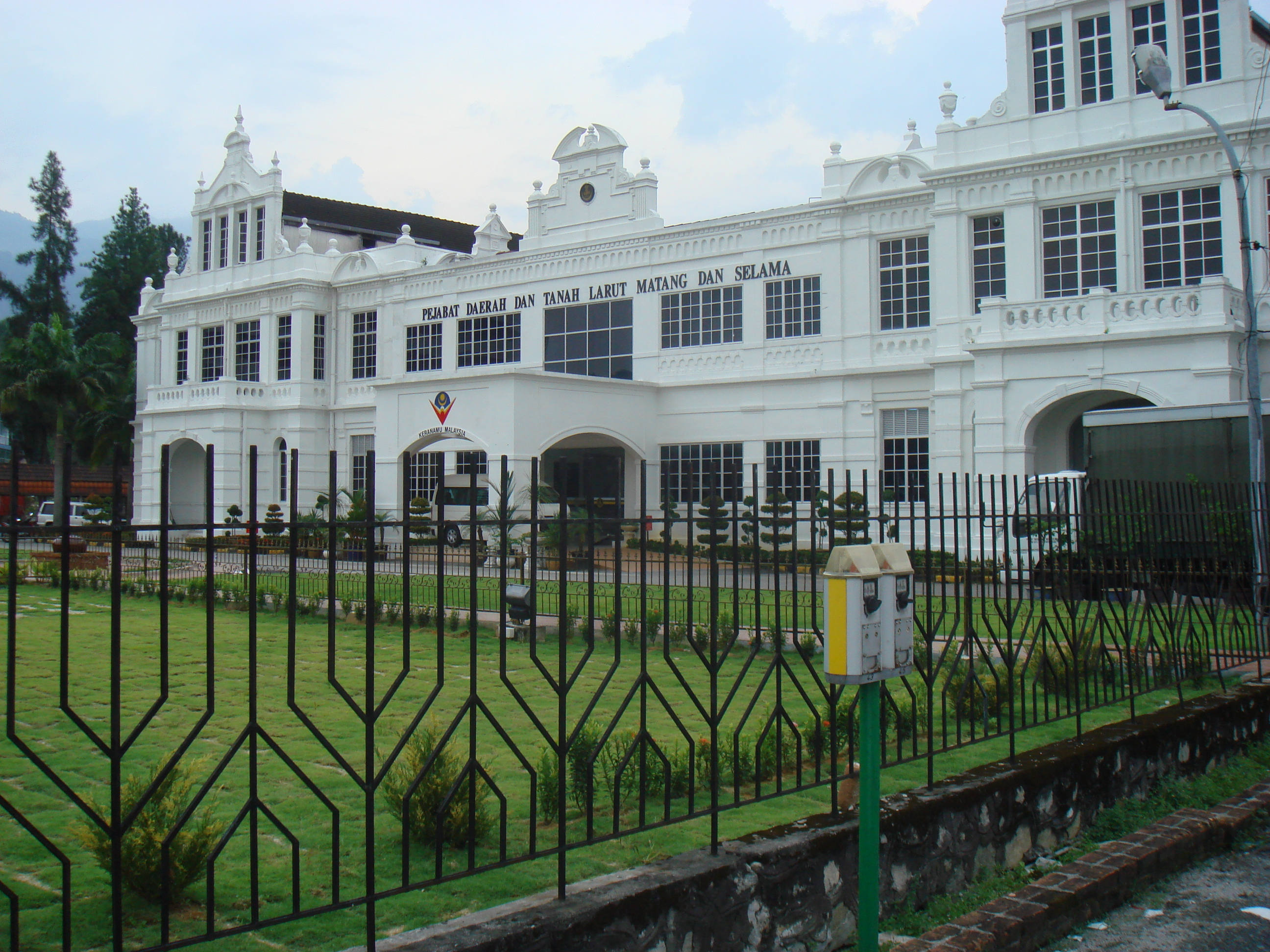
The colonial-era Larut, Matang and Selama Land and District Office.

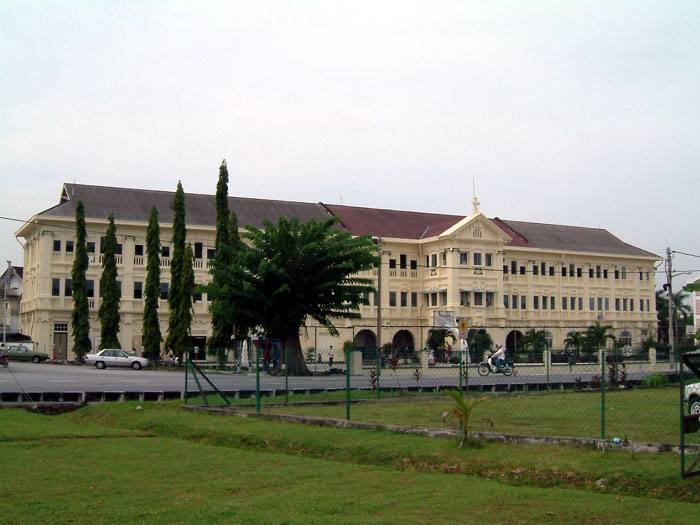
St. George's Institution, a colonial boys' school established in 1915.

Long Jaafar has been historically credited with the discovery of tin in Larut in 1848. According to legend, Long Jaafar had an elephant named Larut and he used to take this elephant with him when journeying between Bukit Gantang and Lubok Merbau. One day the elephant went missing and when the elephant was eventually found three days later Long Jaafar noticed tin ore embedded in the mud that was on the elephant's legs. It is said that this was how Larut got its name.

Eventually in 1850, Larut district was bestowed upon Long Jaafar by Raja Muda Ngah Ali and the Chiefs of Perak: the Temenggong, Panglima Bukit Gantang, Panglima Kinta, Syahbandar and Seri Adika Raja. Some time later, the Sultan of Perak, Sultan Abdullah, died in 1857 and a series of succession disputes ensued. Unhappy with the abuse and favouritism of various royalties, rival Malay camps took sides with one or the other of the two great Chinese secret societies present in there at the time.

Long Jaafar established and developed his administrative centre at Bukit Gantang and made Kuala Sungai Limau at Trong the principal harbour of the Larut Settlement. In 1857 Long Jaafar was succeeded by his son Ngah Ibrahim. Sultan Jaffar Muazzam Shah presented an acknowledgement letter to Ngah Ibrahim on 24 May 1858. This letter was signed by Sultan Jaffar, Raja Muda Ngah Ali and the Raja Bendahara of Perak. In the time of Ngah Ibrahim the Chinese increased in number and by early 1860 two large groups were formed by the Chinese, the "Five Associations" whose members worked in the mines of Klian Pauh and the "Four Associations" whose members worked in the mines of Klian Baharu.

Mining rights were given to the Hakka "Five Associations" or Go-Kuan (五館 or 五群) and the Cantonese "Four Associations" or Si-Kuan (四館). Chung Keng Quee (鄭景貴) was leader of the Hakka Go-Kuan and the Hai San (海山) society that they belonged to, and began to operate his tin mines in Larut in 1860. Larut was destined to be plagued by four major wars between members of both the Cantonese Go-Kuan Ghee Hin Society (義興私會黨) and the Hakka Hai San society. Many Hakka had fled China when the Taiping Rebellion broke out there and found work in the mines of Chung Keng Quee establishing his position over the mining area in Larut as leader of the Hai San from 1860 to 1884.

The capital of Perak was moved from Bandar Baru (New Town) to Taiping after Datok Maharaja Lela assassinated the first British Resident of Perak Mr. James Wheeler Woodford Birch at Pasir Salak in 1875. In 1937, the capital of Perak was moved from Taiping to Ipoh.

The town's mining industry continued to thrive; the country's first railway was built to transport tin from Taiping to Port Weld (now known as Kuala Sepetang) at the coast for export. The first train in Malaysia took its schedule on 1 June 1885.

By 1900, an English language school, a newspaper, and the Perak Museum (the oldest in Malaysia) had been established.

Although Taiping's economy declined with the dwindling tin deposits, tin mining remains an important industry in the area, as do rubber and rice.

== Geography ==
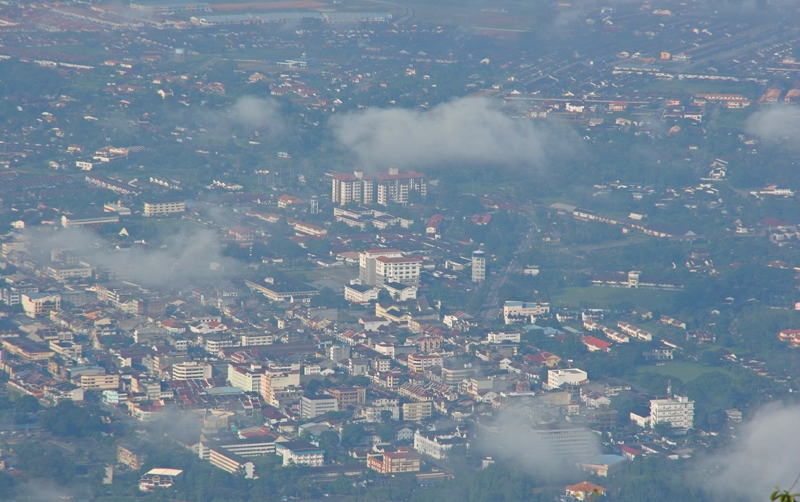
Aerial view of Taiping

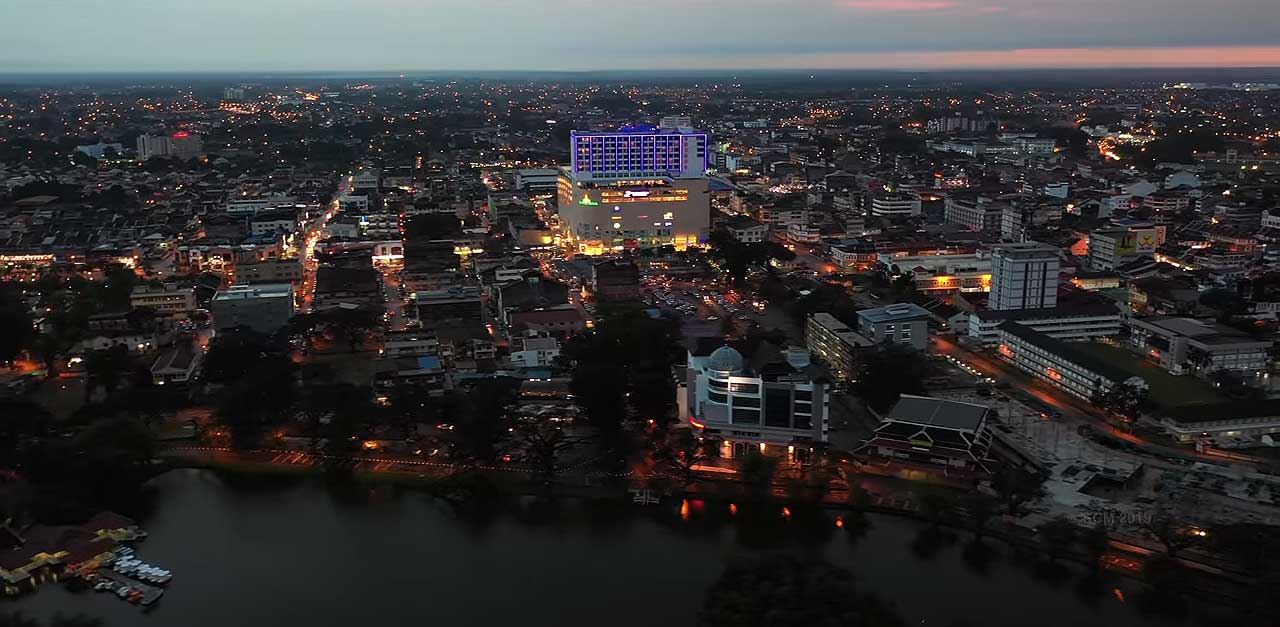
Night view of Taiping

Taiping lies 23m above sea level situated on a plain to the west of the Bintang Mountains. Perak's capital city, Ipoh, is approximately 48 km (30 mi) southeast of the town, while George Town, the capital city of the neighbouring state of Penang, lies 78 km (48 mi) away to the northwest.

=== Climate ===
Taiping also receives some limelight for being the wettest town in Peninsular Malaysia even on the driest month. In June, the town still receives 159 mm (6.3 in) of rainfall. The average annual rainfall is about 3,200 mm (130 in) in Taiping while the peninsula's average is 2,000 mm (79 in)–2,500 mm (98 in). Its unusual rainfall has also led to a fertile collection of flora and century-old rain trees in the Taiping Lake Gardens.

Climate data for Taiping, Malaysia (1982–2012)
Month	Jan	Feb	Mar	Apr	May	Jun	Jul	Aug	Sep	Oct	Nov	Dec	Year
Mean daily maximum °C (°F)	32.1 (89.8)	32.4 (90.3)	32.9 (91.2)	32.7 (90.9)	32.9 (91.2)	33.0 (91.4)	32.8 (91.0)	32.8 (91.0)	32.2 (90.0)	32.0 (89.6)	31.8 (89.2)	31.9 (89.4)	32.5 (90.4)
Mean daily minimum °C (°F)	21.4 (70.5)	22.1 (71.8)	22.5 (72.5)	22.9 (73.2)	23.1 (73.6)	22.6 (72.7)	22.3 (72.1)	22.2 (72.0)	22.3 (72.1)	22.2 (72.0)	22.0 (71.6)	21.6 (70.9)	22.3 (72.1)
Average precipitation mm (inches)	203 (8.0)	222 (8.7)	293 (11.5)	363 (14.3)	280 (11.0)	159 (6.3)	188 (7.4)	202 (8.0)	267 (10.5)	386 (15.2)	354 (13.9)	270 (10.6)	3,187 (125.4)
Source: climate-data.org

=== Government ===
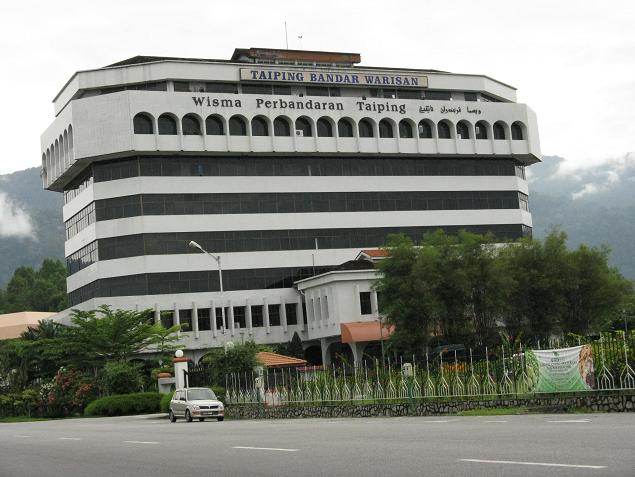
Taiping Municipal Council

The Taiping Municipal Council is the municipal council which administers the township. This council was established after the township in 1930. Their jurisdiction covers an area of 186.46 square kilometres.

Due to electoral division by Election Commission of Malaysia, there are two parliamentary and six state constituencies (DUN) dividing the township. There are Taiping parliamentary seat, Aulong, Pokok Assam and Kamunting state seat meanwhile for Bukit Gantang parliamentary seat, Terong, Kuala Sepetang and Changkat Jering state seat.

== Demographics ==
Taiping has traditionally been a Chinese majority which is still retained to date. The Chinese make up 46%, followed by Malays at 40%, and Indians at 12%. Others constitute 1% of the population.

Ethnic composition of Taiping (2020)
Ethnicities / Nationality	Percentage
Chinese	46.02%
Malay	40.42%
Indians	12.33%
Others	1.23%

== Education ==
Primary and secondary education in Taiping are provided by national-type schools, Chinese-medium schools and Tamil-medium schools. Some of the notable schools are SMK Convent Taiping, SM Klian Pauh, Sekolah Menengah Jenis Kebangsaan Hua Lian, St. George's Institution, SMK King Edward VII, and Treacher Methodist Girls' School.

== Attractions ==
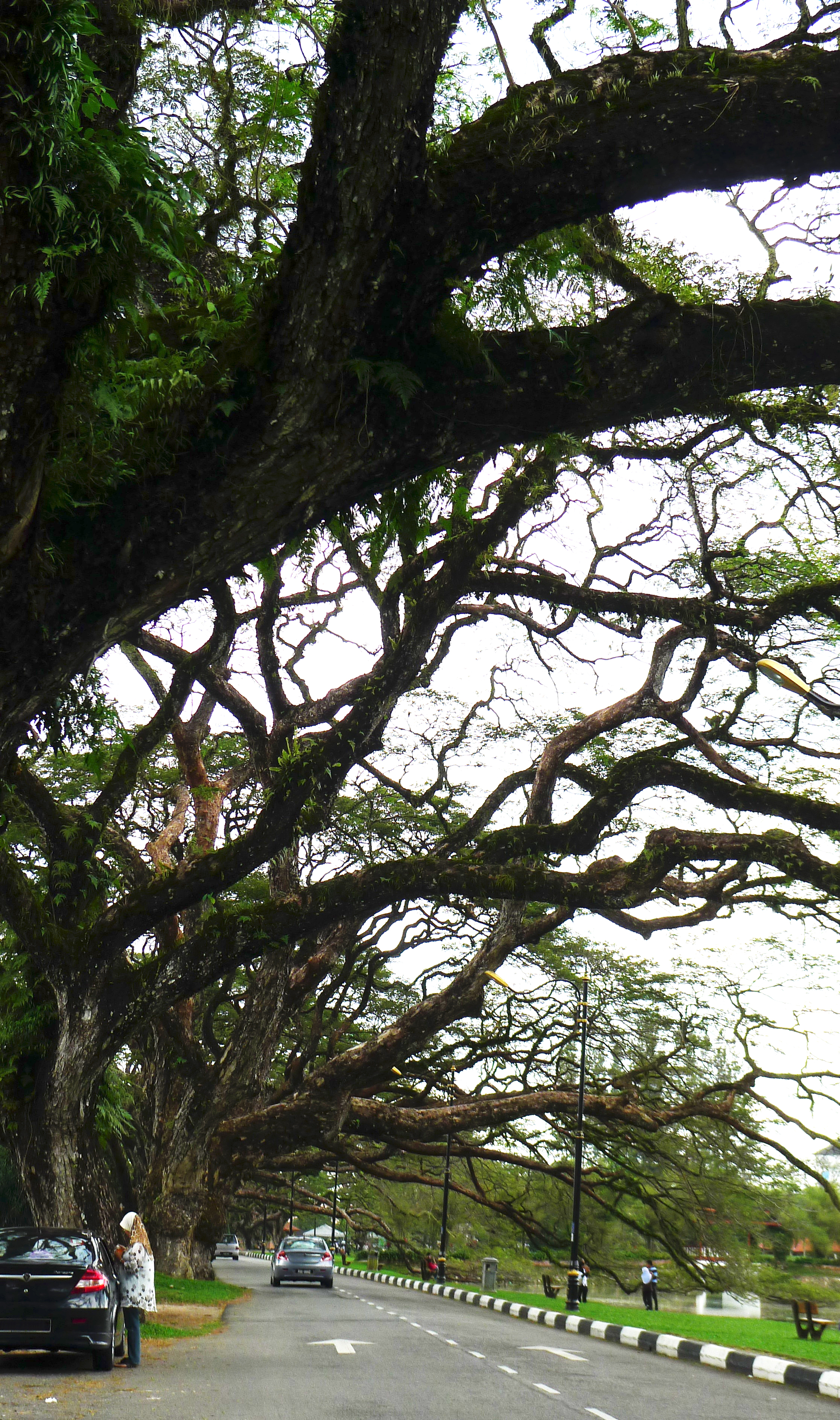
The iconic raintrees (Albizia saman) along the road around Taiping Lake Gardens that have been there since the British colonial times over a hundred years ago. The trees have been the subject of local conservationists efforts to protect them against removal by the municipal council for a new development.

- Lake Gardens – The first public garden established during the British rule in Malaysia. It was originally a mining ground before established as a public garden in 1880.
- Maxwell Hill (Bukit Larut) – A hill station with an altitude of about 1000m; ideal for jungle-trekking and camping.
- Tulip Garden – Located at Bukit Larut, it is the first tulip farm established in Malaysia. This has now been closed.
- Taiping Zoo and Night Safari Taiping – First zoo to be established in Malaysia; popular on weekends with day-trippers from out of town
- Old Clock Tower.
- Perak Museum - First and oldest museum in Malaysia, established since 1886 by Sir Hugh Low.
- All Saints' Church - The first church in the Federated Malay States, founded in 1886.

== Notable people ==
- Anwar Fazal, Born in Sungei Bayor (Selama) but resided in Taiping. Anwar is the founder and also Chairman of the Taiping Peace Initiative and various non-governmental organisations in Malaysia.
- Imee Ooi, music producer, composer, arranger and vocalist.
- Lim Swee Aun, Former Health Minister of Malaysia.
- Uthaya Sankar SB, Malaysian writer from Aulong Lama, Taiping.
- Toh Chin Chye, Singaporean politician who served as the Deputy Prime Minister for Singapore.

== Transportation ==
=== Rail ===
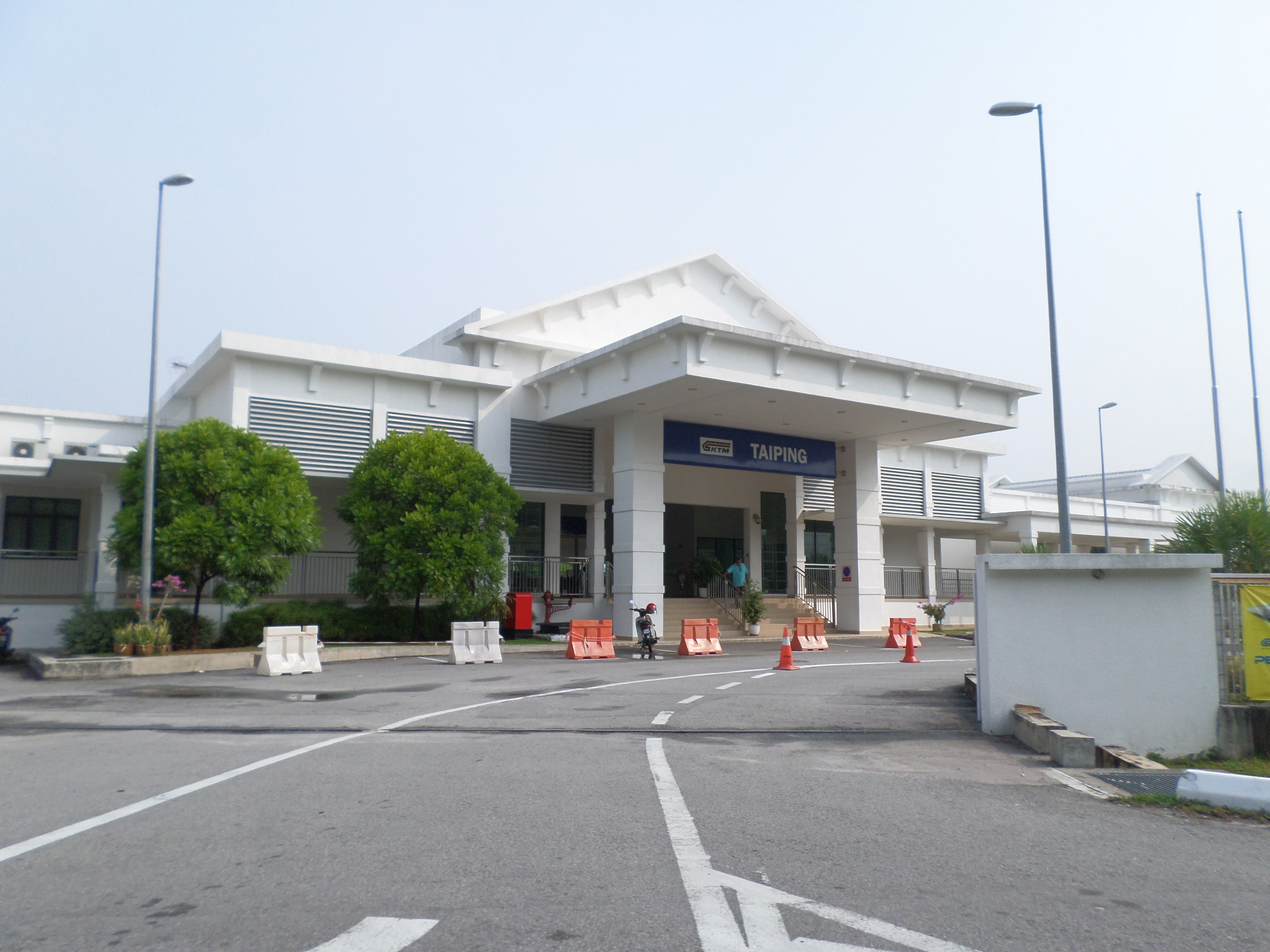
Taiping railway station

Taiping railway station was the first operational train station in Malaysia. Originally, the station served the local tin mines, transporting ore to Port Weld (now Kuala Sepetang) and mine workers to their dedicated settlements. In the 1930s, railway connections to major towns like Ipoh, Kuala Lumpur, and Singapore started. The Taiping-Port Weld line was dismantled by KTMB in the 1980s.

The station was previously served only by KTM Intercity trains, with a one-way trip to KL Sentral taking about six hours. Since 1 July 2015, the station is also served by KTM ETS's ETS Ekspres service, reducing travel times on the same route to about three hours. Taiping is also a stop on the ETS Transit service between Ipoh and Padang Besar. The station is also served by the KTM Komuter Northern Sector.

=== Bus ===
Taiping Bus Terminal, 1km distance from the rail station

2 major public bus companies serve Taiping, and provide affordable and convenient connections to nearby towns. Blue Omnibus operates routes to coastal Kuala Sepetang (77), traditional craft hub Beruas (76), Pantai Remis (75), and industrial Sri Manjung - Lumut (84). Red Omnibus serves the royal town of Kuala Kangsar (54), agricultural Batu Kurau, historical border town Parit Buntar (8), and Selama (2).

=== Air ===
Taiping does not have its airport. The nearest airports are:

- Sultan Azlan Shah Airport, located 73 km (45 mi) south east.
- Penang International Airport, located 96 km (60 mi) north west.

== See also ==
- Wesley Methodist Church, Taiping Perak
