= Pokok Assam =

Town in Larut, Matang and Selama, Perak, Malaysia

- Small Town In Taiping

Pokok Assam is a small town in Taiping, Perak, Malaysia. It is the second biggest satellite town in Taiping, after Kamunting, with its famous road side fried chicken and Mee Rebus. It has its own post office, basketball court, police station and wet market.

It has a very active morning and night market that operates daily. The action around this small community centres on the market area. In the morning Pokok Assam is famous for its roast pork for which many town people from Taiping come to purchase. It is usually sold out by 9 am.

Jalan Tupai is the main road leading from Taiping town to Pokok Assam. There is an abattoir and police station on the road leading to this town. There is also good "lai fun" (thick rice noodles) and hokkien mee (prawn mee) at the market. Pokok Assam is a "White Village", created during the Malaya Emergency in the 1950s.
