= Aulong =

Suburb in Taiping, Malaysia

Coordinates: 4°50′44.6″N 100°42′48.3″E

Aulong is a suburb of Taiping, Perak, Malaysia. This suburb has an estimated population of 5,000, with the majority being Chinese and Malays. The main town centre consists of the old and new villages. There are a few housing estates in the area, including Taman Pertama and Taman Kami (Phase A to D). Together with Pokok Assam, Aulong is a "White village", which was created during the Malaya Emergency in the 1950s.

This suburb has a mosque, an Indian Temple, a Chinese temple and a Catholic Chapel. It also has a police station and a community hall. Two factories of the cottage industry are located here – a toothpick factory and an ice-cream "potong" (popsicle) manufacturer. The main roads in this area include Jalan Izuddin Shah, Jalan Sultan, Jalan Permaisuri, Jalan Simpang Halt and Jalan Tekah in Kampung Boyan. There is a Shell petrol station in Giant Taiping. Petronas is also located beside Hua Lian (1) and (2) Primary schools.
