= Changkat Jering =

Town in Larut, Matang and Selama District, Perak, Malaysia

Coordinates: 4°47′N 100°43′E

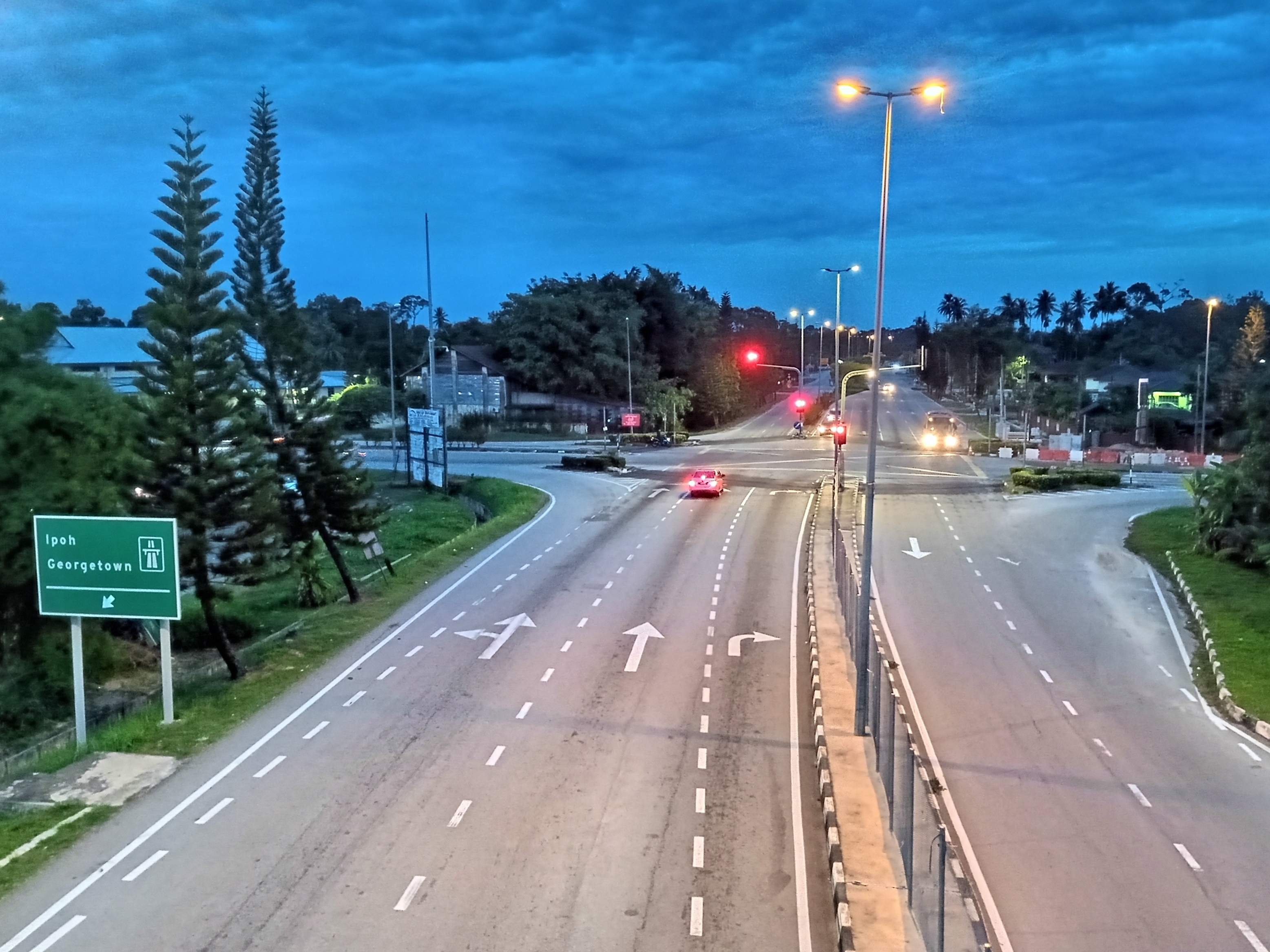
Changkat Jering

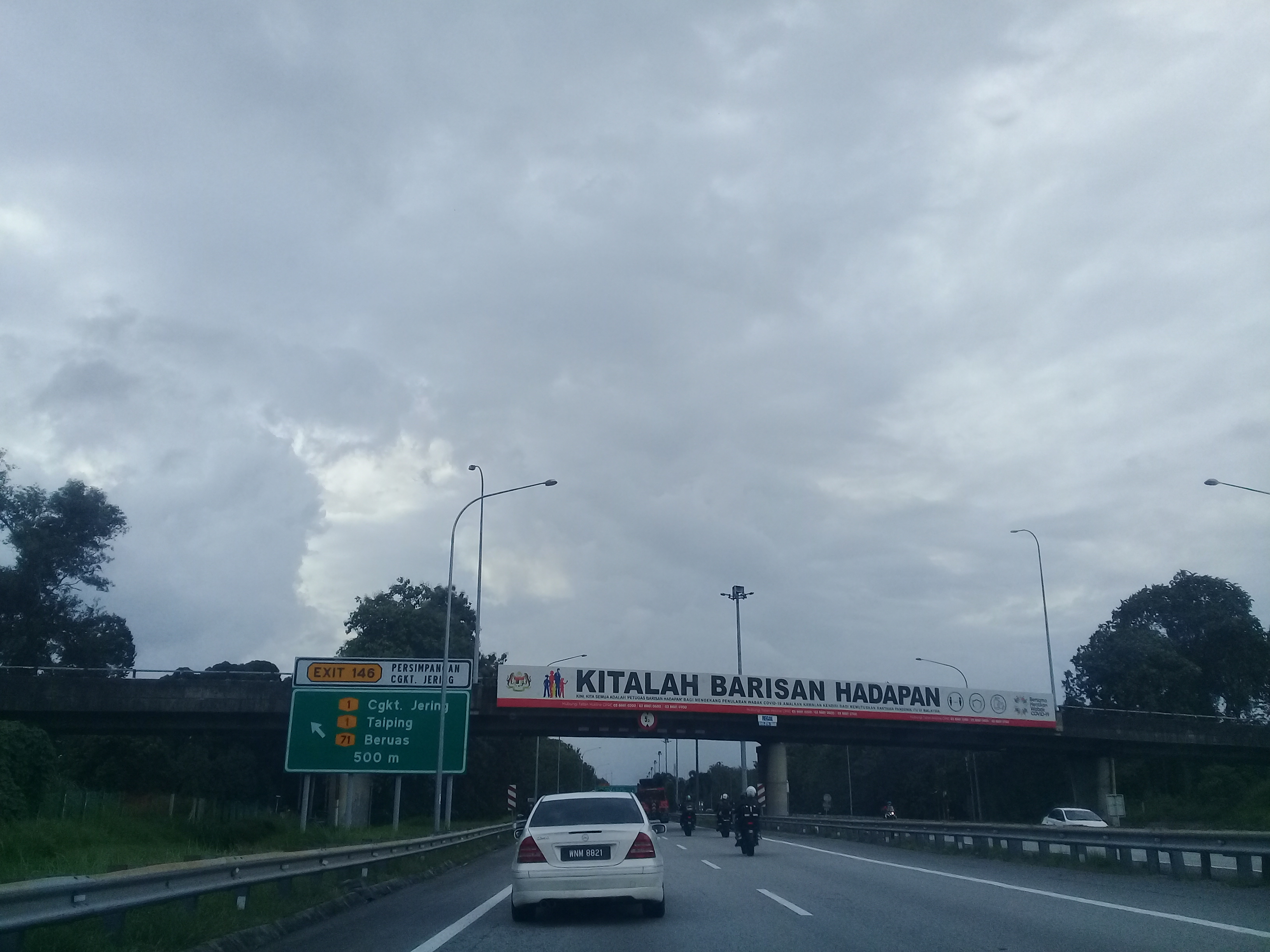
Changkat Jering Interchange

Changkat Jering (Jawi: چڠكت جريڠ) is a small town in Larut, Matang and Selama District, Perak, Malaysia. It connects Taiping to the North–South Expressway via the southern exit, as well as being the northern terminus of the West Coast Expressway. Changkat Jering is famed for its big weekly evening market on Saturdays. Changkat Jering is situated within the parliamentary constituency of Bukit Gantang.

== Secondary Schools in Changkat Jering ==
1. SMK Tengku Menteri 2. SMK Dato' Wan Ahmad Rasdi – Official school website in the national language

== Primary Schools in Changkat Jering ==
- SK Changkat Jering
- SK Sultan Abdullah, Kg Cheh, Bukit Gantang
- SK Jelutong, Kg Jelutong, Changkat Jering
- SJK(C) Yuk Chuen, Jalan Besar, Changkat Jering
