= Bukit Gantang =

Mukim and parliament constituency in Malaysia

Coordinates: 4°46′53.7″N 100°45′39.0″E

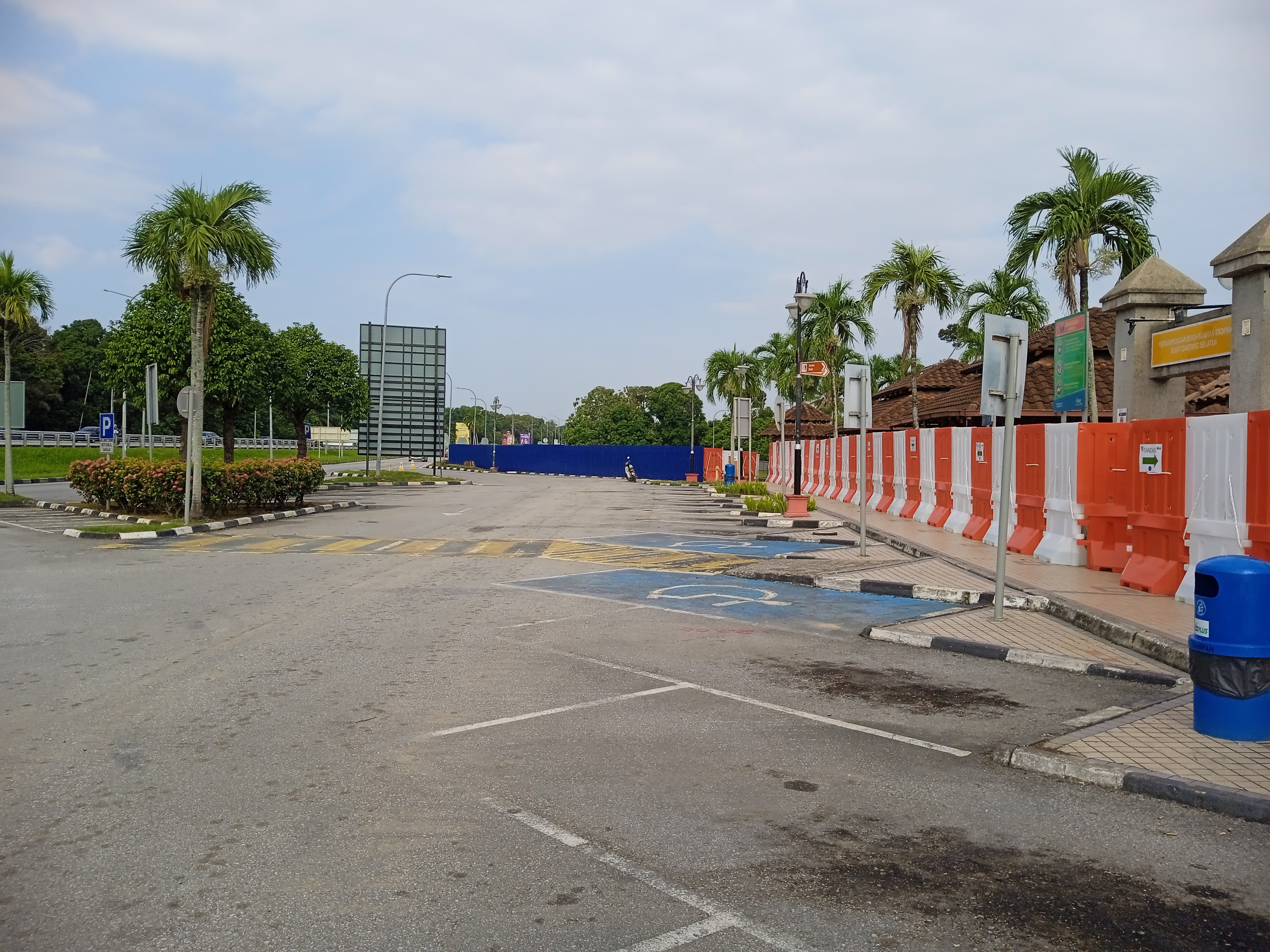
Bukit Gantang Lay-by of North–South Expressway Northern Route at Bukit Gantang

Bukit Gantang (Jawi: بوكيت ڬنتڠ) is a mukim and parliament constituency in Larut, Matang and Selama District, Perak, Malaysia.

Bukit Gantang (as with Batu Kurau) is famous for its durian orchard. One of the longest train tunnels in Malaysia could also be found in this hilly area.

== See also ==
- Bukit Gantang by-election, 2009
