= Larut, Matang and Selama District =

District of Perak, Malaysia

- District of Perak
- Daerah Larut, Matang dan Selama
- Interactive map of Larut, Matang and Selama District
- Location of Larut, Matang and Selama District in Malaysia
- Coordinates: 4°55′N 100°45′E
- Country: Malaysia
- State: Perak
- Seat: Taiping
- Local area government(s): Taiping Municipal Council (Larut & Matang); Selama District Council (Selama)

Government
  - District officer: Mohamed Akmal Bin Dahalan

Area
  - Total: 2,112.61 km^{2} (815.68 sq mi)

Population (2010)
  - Total: 326,941
  - Estimate (2015): 352,800
  - Density: 154.757/km^{2} (400.819/sq mi)
- Time zone: UTC+8 (MST)
  - Summer (DST): UTC+8 (Not observed)
- Postcode: 340xx-341xx, 345xx-348xx
- Calling code: +6-05
- Vehicle registration plates: A

Selama District Council Majlis Daerah Selama
- Local Government Act 1976

Type
- Type: Municipal Council of Selama

History
- Founded: 1 September 1979

Leadership
- President: Nor Akmal Bin Yang Ghazali

Website
- www.mdselama.gov.my

The Larut, Matang and Selama District is a district of Perak, Malaysia. Taiping is the capital town of this district. Larut, Matang and Selama used to be three small different districts and they merged into one larger district later. Larut, Matang and Selama houses Taiping, Perak's second largest city and former state capital. Other towns in the region include Changkat Jering, Terong, Matang, Kuala Sepetang and Selama. The region borders the state of Kedah on the north, the Kerian District on the northwest, the Hulu Perak and Kuala Kangsar District on the east, and the Manjung District on the south.

== History ==
The area has a long history dating back to the mid-1850s. The Larut War occurred around Taiping and Matang. The first railway in the Malay states was constructed here, connecting Taiping with Kuala Sepetang, formerly Port Weld. Larut, Matang and Selama is also the place where the first modern town, museum and hill station were built in Perak as Taiping was the capital of the Federated Malay States, before Kuala Lumpur took the honor.

== Administrative divisions ==
Map of Larut & Matang Sub-district

Larut and Matang District is divided into 11 mukims (communes) and Taiping city, which are:

- Asam Kumbang
- Batu Kurau
- Bukit Gantang
- Jebong
- Kamunting
- Matang
- Pengkalan Aor
- Simpang
- Sungai Limau
- Sungai Tinggi
- Trong

Map of Selama Sub-district

Larut, Matang and Selama district also contains the Selama autonomous sub-district (daerah kecil) in the northern portion, covering 3 mukims which are:

- Hulu Selama
- Selama
- Hulu Ijok

=== Government ===
Currently, Larut, Matang and Selama district is governed by two different councils which is Taiping Municipal Council for southern part of the district while the subdistrict of Selama is under its own district council.

== Demographics ==
Historical population
Year	Pop.	±%
1991	271,882	—
2000	273,641	+0.6%
2010	326,476	+19.3%
2020	304,023	−6.9%
Figures for 2020 includes Selama Sub-district. Source:

The following is based on Department of Statistics Malaysia 2010 census.

Ethnic groups in Larut and Matang, 2010 census
Ethnicity	Population	Percentage
Bumiputera	204,967	62.7%
Chinese	85,172	26.1%
Indian	36,105	11.0%
Others	697	0.2%
Total	326,941	100%

== Federal Parliament and State Assembly Seats ==
List of Larut, Matang and Selama district representatives in the Federal Parliament (Dewan Rakyat)

Parliament	Seat Name	Member of Parliament	Party
P56	Larut	Hamzah Zainudin	Perikatan Nasional (PPBM)
P59	Bukit Gantang	Syed Abu Hussin Hafiz	Independent
P60	Taiping	Wong Kah Woh	Pakatan Harapan (DAP)

List of Larut, Matang and Selama district representatives in the State Legislative Assembly

Parliament	State	Seat Name	State Assemblyman	Party
P56	N5	Selama	Mohd Akmal Kamarudin	Perikatan Nasional (PAS)
P56	N6	Kubu Gajah	Khalil Yahaya	Perikatan Nasional (PAS)
P56	N7	Batu Kurau	Mohd Najmuddin Elias Al-Hafiz	Perikatan Nasional (BERSATU)
P59	N13	Kuala Sepetang	Ahmad Man	Perikatan Nasional (BERSATU)
P59	N14	Changkat Jering	Rahim Ismail	Perikatan Nasional (PAS)
P59	N15	Trong	Faisal Abdul Rahman	Perikatan Nasional (PAS)
P60	N16	Kamunting	Mohd Fakhruddin Abdul Aziz	Perikatan Nasional (PAS)
P60	N17	Pokok Assam	Ong Seng Guan	Pakatan Harapan (DAP)
P60	N18	Aulong	Teh Kok Lim	Pakatan Harapan (DAP)

== See also ==
- Districts of Malaysia
