= Malaysia Federal Route 74 =

Road in Malaysia

Federal Route 74
- Jalan Taiping–Kuala Sepetang 太平–十八丁路
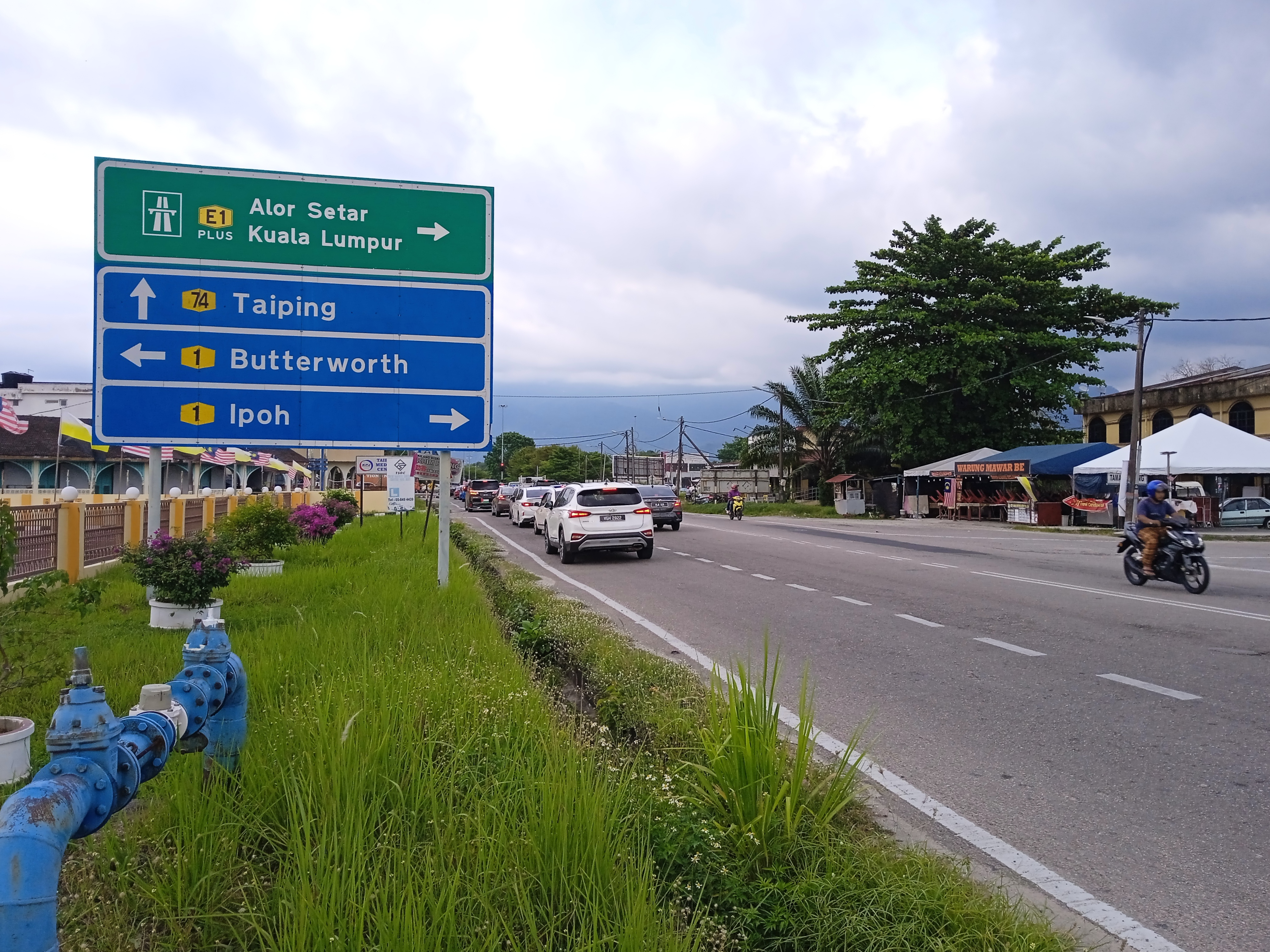

Route information
- Maintained by Malaysian Public Works Department
- Length: 17.13 km (10.64 mi)
- History: Built on the former site of the Taiping–Port Weld railway line until 1941.

Major junctions
- West end: Kuala Sepetang (Port Weld)
- FT 1 Federal Route 1 FT 3146 Federal Route 3146
- East end: Taiping

Location
- Country: Malaysia
- Primary destinations: Matang, Kota Ngah Ibrahim, Simpang, Taiping, Bukit Larut

Highway system
- Highways in Malaysia; Expressways; Federal; State

Federal Route 74, or Jalan Taiping–Kuala Sepetang, is a federal road in Perak, Malaysia. The 17.1 km (10.6 mi) roads connects Taiping to Kuala Sepetang (formerly Port Weld). The road was built at the site of the first railway line in Malaysia from Taiping to Port Weld in 1885.

== Route background ==
The Kilometre Zero of the Federal Route 74 starts at Kuala Sepetang (formerly Port Weld).

== History ==
Taiping–Port Weld Railway Line Landasan Keretapi Taiping–Port Weld 太平–砵威铁路线

Overview
- Status: Ceased operation
- Locale: Taiping, Malaya.
- Termini: Taiping, Perak; Port Weld, Perak
- Stations: 4

Service
- Type: Passenger and freight light rail
- Services: 1
- Operator(s): Perak State Railway
- Rolling stock: >3 steam locomotive; unknown number of railroad cars.

History
- Opened: 1885
- Closed: 1941

Technical
- Number of tracks: 1
- Track gauge: 1,000 mm (3 ft 3 3/8 in)

The road used to be a main railway line of Taiping–Port Weld, the first railway line in Malaysia. Construction of the railway began in 1884 and was completed in 1885. The railway line starting from Port Weld passing Jebong, Simpang Halt and finally Taiping. Service began on 1 February 1885, lasting until 1941. After dismantled, the railway line is now the main road section from Port Weld (now Kuala Sepetang) to Sekolah Kebangsaan Ngah Ibrahim, Matang and the village road section of Jalan Jebong and Jalan Simpang Halt from Jebong to Taiping.

=== Stations ===
- Taiping
- Simpang Halt
- Jebong
- Port Weld

== Features ==
- The former Port Weld railway station and signage at Kuala Sepetang.
- Kota Ngah Ibrahim

At most sections, the Federal Route 74 was built under the JKR R5 road standard, allowing maximum speed limit of up to 90 km/h.

== Junction lists ==
The entire route is located in Larut, Matang and Selama District, Perak.

Legend:

- I/C - Interchange, I/S - Intersection, RSA - Rest and service area, OBR - Overhead bridge restaurant, R/R - Restaurant and rest plaza, L/B - Layby, V/P - Vista point, TN - tunnel, T/P - Toll plaza, BR - Bridge
- C - Cloverleaf, S - Stack, T-A - Trumpet-A, T-B - Trumpet-B, DT - Directional-T/Y, SDT - Semi-Directional-T/Y, P-Y - Partial-Y, D - Diamond, P-C - Partial cloverleaf, D-D - Diverging diamond, D-R - Direct ramp

Location	km	mi	Name	Destinations	Notes
Kuala Sepetang (Port Weld)	0.0	0.0	Kuala Sepetang	Kampung Kuala Sepetang	
Kuala Sepetang (Port Weld)			Historical Railway Line; Taiping–Port Weld (Historical site)		
Kuala Sepetang (Port Weld)			Kuala Sepetang	Historical railway station and signage Historical railway line	Historical site
Kuala Sepetang (Port Weld)			Kuala Sepetang	Kampung Menteri	
Kuala Sepetang (Port Weld)			Tebok Matang		
Kuala Sepetang (Port Weld)			Jalan Jebong	Jalan Jebong – Jebong, Simpang Halt, Historical railway line	T-junctions
Kuala Sepetang (Port Weld)			Historical Railway Line; Taiping–Port Weld (Historical site)		
Matang			Desa Matang		
Matang			Sungai Jebong Kanan bridge		
Matang			Kampung Tebing Tinggi	Kampung Tebing Tinggi	T-junctions
Matang			Sungai Larut bridge		
Matang			Matang	Jalan Titi Kertang – Kampung Titi Kertang	
Matang			Kota Ngah Ibrahim Historical Complex	Kota Ngah Ibrahim Historical Complex – Kota Ngah Ibrahim private residence, Makam Ngah Ibrahim's grave	T-junctions
Matang			Jalan Kampung Melawati	Jalan Kampung Melawati – Kampung Melawati	T-junctions
Matang			SK Matang	Sekolah Kebangsaan Matang	
Matang			North–South Expressway Bridge		
Simpang			Sungai Mati		
Simpang			Taman Matang Utama		
Simpang			Taman Lagenda		
Simpang			Taman Palong Utama		
Simpang			Simpang	FT 1 Malaysia Federal Route 1 – Butterworth, Parit Buntar, Kamunting, Changkat Jering, Pantai Remis, Kuala Kangsar; North–South Expressway Northern Route / AH2 – Bukit Kayu Hitam, Penang, Ipoh, Kuala Lumpur	Junctions
Taiping			Kampung Pengkalan Alor	Jalan Taman Kaya – Taman Kaya	T-junctions
Taiping			Kampung Lombong Bijih Alor		
Taiping			Railway crossing bridge		
Taiping			Railway crossing bridge Jalan Air Kuning	A109 Jalan Air Kuning – Air Kuning, Changkat Jering	T-junctions below bridge
Taiping			Taman Sri Kota		
Taiping			Taman Sri Hijau		
Taiping			Sungai Larut bridge		
Taiping			Taiping; Jalan Raja Sulong Hulu	Jalan Raja Sulong Hulu – Kampung Boyan	T-junctions
Taiping			Taiping; Medan Taiping		
Taiping			Taiping; Jalan Stesen-Jalan Kota	Jalan Stesen – Taiping railway station Jalan Kota – Taiping Lake Gardens, Zoo Taiping, Bukit Larut (Maxwell Hill)	Junctions
Taiping			Taiping; Masjid India, Jalan Kota	Masjid India, Jalan Kota	
Taiping			Taiping; Jalan Masjid	Jalan Masjid – Taiping Mosque	T-junctions
Taiping			Taiping; Taiping Hospital	Taiping Hospital	
Taiping			Taiping; Jalan Idris	Jalan Idris	T-junctions
Taiping			Taiping; Jalan Abdul Jalil	Jalan Abdul Jalil	T-junctions
Taiping			Taiping; Jalan Yusuf	Jalan Yusuf	T-junctions
Taiping			Taiping; Jalan Lim Teong Chye	Jalan Lim Teong Chye	Junctions
Taiping			Taiping; Jalan Lim Tee Hooi	Jalan Lim Tee Hooi	Junctions
Taiping			Taiping; Jalan Ong Saik	Jalan Ong Saik	Junctions
Taiping			Taiping; Jalan Manecksha	Jalan Manecksha	Junctions
Taiping			Taiping; Jalan Alang Ahmad	Jalan Alang Ahmad – Jalan Barack, Larut, Matang & Selama District and Land Office	Junctions
Taiping			Taiping; Dataran Taiping	Dataran Taiping	
Taiping			Taiping; Taiping Municipal Council Building	Taiping Municipal Council Building	
Taiping			Taiping; Taiping Municipal Hall	Taiping Municipal Hall	
Taiping			Taiping; Perak Museum	Perak Museum	
Taiping			Taiping; Jalan Kamunting Lama	FT 3146 Malaysia Federal Route 3146 – Kamunting, Kubu Gajah, Selama; Jalan Lumba Kuda – Taman Suria, Taman Suria Permai; Jalan Taman Tasik – Taiping Lake Gardens, Zoo Taiping, Bukit Larut (Maxwell Hill)	Junctions
1.000 mi = 1.609 km; 1.000 km = 0.621 mi: Incomplete access
