= Ngah Ibrahim =

Malay headman and administrator

- ڠه إبراهيم
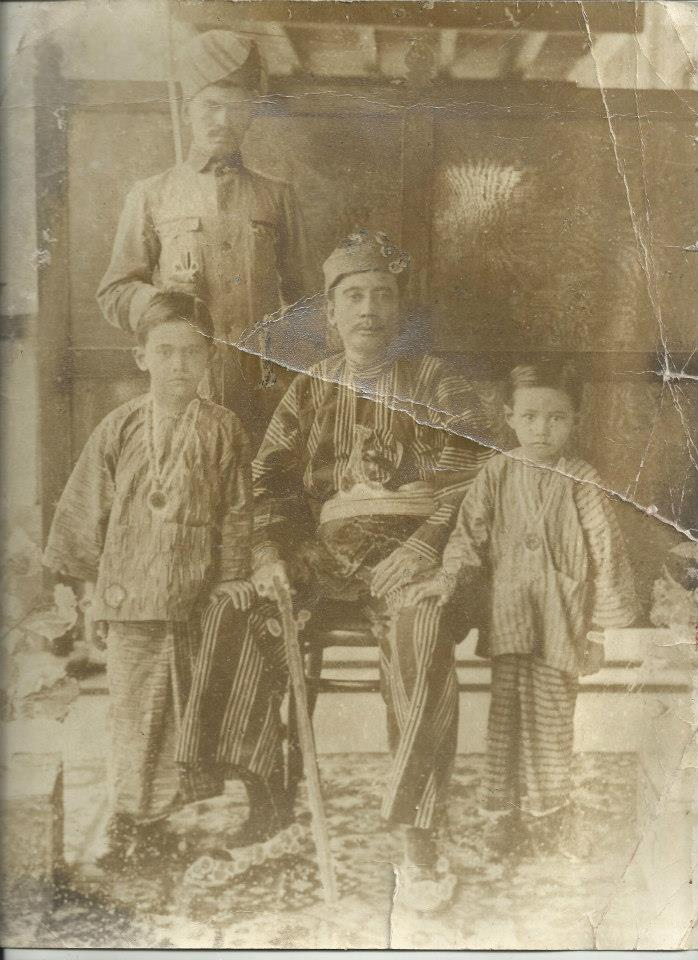
- The Minister Paduka Tuan Ngah Ibrahim with his son Wan Mohd Isa (left), Mat Nasir (right), and Indian police (Sepoy) in Matang, Perak

Orang Kaya Menteri Sri Paduka Tuan
- In office 1863–1877
- Preceded by: 0
- Succeeded by: 0

Menteri Larut
- In office 1859–1863
- Preceded by: Long Jaafar
- Succeeded by: 0
- Majority: =

Personal details
- Born: 1 January 1837 Bukit Gantang, Perak
- Died: 4 February 1895 (aged 58) Aljunied, Singapore
- Resting place: Matang Museum
- Spouse(s): Tuk Puan Halimah; Sa'eah
- Children: Wan Muhammad Isa; Wan Mat Nasir; Wan Yeop Abdul Shukur; Wan Che Sufiah

Ngah Ibrahim or famously known as Tengku Menteri, Menteri Larut or Raja Larut was a Malay headman who succeeded his father Long Jaafar as headman and administrator of the district of Larut upon the death of his father in 1857 till his exile to Seychelles in 1876.

A known millionaire from tin mining, he has been noted for first bringing modern administration practice in Perak, way before British arrival. Apart from tin mining, he also had other ventures (such as sugarcane and coffee).

At his peak, he was noted as the richest man in Perak, richer than the Sultan of Perak himself.

== History ==
=== Early life ===
He was born in 1837 as a second child out of three from a wealthy family of Raja Timah, Long Jaafar and his mother was Ngah pura, daughter of Syed Alang Alauddin. He was raised in Larut. His other siblings is Kulup Seman and Ch Alang Sepiah. He was adopted son of Sultan Jaafar Muazzam Shah, Sultan of Perak at that time. There, he gained easy access to the palace. He later on went to Johor to learn modern administrative skill from Temenggong Daeng Ibrahim.

=== As Raja Larut ===
After his father's death, he was in his teenage years. Larut was governed by his uncle, Ngah Lamat for two years. On 30 November 1857, he was granted powers to rule over Lumut far greater than his father. He then built his mansion or fortress called Kota Ngah Ibrahim nearby Sungai Larut in Matang. The complex was built near Sungai Larut, to enable easy access to his four ships, including two fire ships. By the end of March 1864, he was granted Orang Kaya Menteri Sri Paduka Tuan, highest title in Perak at that time. His power is vested for land for the north of Kinta river to south of Bruas river. His rise was noted from his wealth and his marriage to Perak aristocrat.

During his administration, he instructed the pavement of roads throughout the area and govern thru modern administration practice, such as establishing magistrate, judge, treasurer and clerk system. He also move the administrative capital of Larut from Bukit Gantang to Matang and Lumut port from Sungai Limau to Kuala Sepetang. To enshrine Islamic practice in Klian Pauh, he rebuild a madarash from wooden architecture to a brick masjid.

During his tenure, he encountered difficulties in managing rise of local Chinese triad conflict, especially between Ghee Hin and Hai San. This led to first Larut war in 1861. The Governor of the Straits Settlements, Orfeur Cavenagh intervened and on behalf of Sultan of Perak, he paid compensation the Ghee Hin with amount of $17,447. To enhance security of Larut, he assembled police force, headed by Tristram Speedy. The police force was powered with 110 sepoy from India. Between 1871 and 1872, third Larut War erupted over a scandal – an extra-marital relationship involving the Ghee Hin leader and the wife of a nephew of the Hai San leader, Chung Keng Quee. He was noted to supporting Hai San during this period to regain back their Larut and Matang mines.

By the time of Sultan Ismail Mu'abbiddin Riayat Shah rule, Ngah Ibrahim had quarrelled with Raja Muda Abdullah II, the son of the former sultan who had been passed over by the Royal Council in favour of Ismail. Abdullah sought to engineer a situation where the British would recognise him as Sultan and sought the services and recognition of Ngah Ibrahim. In return he appointed Ngah Ibrahim as Orang Kaya Mantri of Larut in 1858. The two of them had a falling-out and embroiled miners in the Larut area in their dispute. A fourth Larut War on 1873 between Hai San supported by him and Ghee Hin supported by Raja Muda Abdullah II eventually resulted in intervention by the British, the treaties at Pangkor for the cessation of hostilities between the miners, the recognition of Abdullah as Sultan of Perak and the appointment of a British Resident whose advice must be asked and acted upon on all questions except those touching Malay religion and custom.

As a result of the agreement, Ngah Ibrahim lost his rights to collect taxes. James W. W. Birch, first Resident of Perak, also disregarded Malay rulers and chiefs' opinions in managing the state, prompting Ngah Ibrahim, another Malay chief and Sultan Abdullah II to conspire for his murder. Lela Pandak Lam murdered Birch on 2nd November 1875. This led to the Perak War from 1875 till 1877.

After the conclusion of the Perak War, Ngah Ibrahim and Sultan Abdullah II were exiled to the Seychelles for being involved in the murder of James W. W. Birch.

=== Later life ===
He never returned to Perak after his exile to Seychelles. He were deported to Sarawak and then to Singapore. He died and were buried in Aljunied cemetray, Singapore. His body were brought back to Larut on 9 September 2006 by Malaysian government. His remains were brought back by Royal Malaysian Navy ship, KD Laksamana and were granted ceremonial burial.

== Legacy ==
There are several school named after him in Perak.

- SK Ngah Ibrahim
- SMK Tengku Menteri

== See also ==
- Kota Ngah Ibrahim - Fortress slash mansion build by Ngah Ibrahim residency
- Chung Keng Quee
