= Negaraku =

National anthem of Malaysia

"Negaraku" نݢاراکو
English: My Country
- Coat of arms of Malaysia
- National anthem of Malaysia
- Lyrics: National Anthem Committee, led by Tunku Abdul Rahman, 1957
- Adopted: August 1957; 69 years ago

Audio sample
- United States Navy Band instrumental version in A-flat major: file; help

"Negaraku" (Jawi: نݢاراکو, pronounced [nəgaraku]; English: "My Country") is the national anthem of Malaysia. It was adopted as the national anthem at the time of the Federation of Malaya's independence from the United Kingdom in 1957. The tune was originally used as the state anthem of Perak, "Allah Lanjutkan Usia Sultan".

== History ==
=== Competition and invited composers ===
At the time of independence, each of the eleven states that made up the Federation of Malaya had their own regional anthem, but there was no national anthem for the Federation as a whole (though before independence, it was God Save the Queen that was the colonial anthem). Tunku Abdul Rahman, at the time the Chief Minister and Minister for Home Affairs, organised and presided over a committee for the purpose of choosing a suitable national anthem. At his suggestion, a worldwide competition was launched. 514 entries were received, but none were deemed suitable.

Next, the committee decided to invite selected composers of international repute to submit compositions for consideration. The composers chosen were Benjamin Britten (who later described his submission to be a "curious and I'm afraid rather unsuccessful job"), Sir William Walton, who had recently composed the march for the coronation of Queen Elizabeth II in 1953, and the U.S. opera composer Gian Carlo Menotti and Zubir Said, who later composed "Majulah Singapura", the national anthem of Singapore. Their works were also turned down.

=== Use of Perak State Anthem melody ===
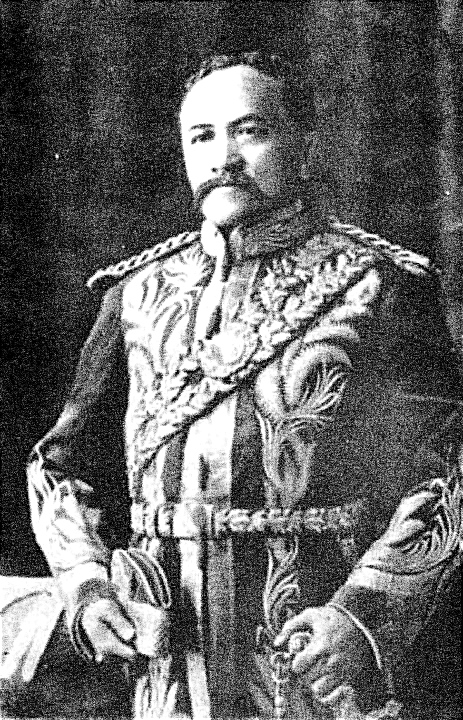
Sultan Abdullah of Perak, who adopted De Béranger's "La Rosalie" as the Perak Royal Anthem during his exile in the Seychelles for abetting murder

Tunku Abdul Rahman then suggested that the state anthem of Perak be used as a basis for the new national anthem, the committee agreed to his suggestion. On 5 August 1957, the Committee chose the Perak State Anthem, citing the "traditional flavour" of its melody. New lyrics for the national anthem were written jointly by the Panel of Judges, led by the Tunku himself. At the time this melody was, while still the State Anthem of Perak, "Allah Lanjutkan Usia Sultan", also the melody of a popular song called "Terang Bulan". The song had been very popular on Mahé, the largest island in the Seychelles, where the Sultan of Perak had formerly been living in exile. When Sultan Idris Murshidul Azzam Shah, who ruled Perak from 1887 to 1916, represented the Rulers of the Federated Malay States at the Coronation of King Edward VII in 1901, his protocol officer was asked what his state anthem was. Realising that his state did not have one, he proceeded to hum the aforementioned tune so as not to appear backward in front of his hosts.

=== 1992 rearrangement ===
The anthem was given a new, and faster march beat in 1992, which proved unpopular and was the subject of much derision, with some Malaysians commenting that the altered tempo resembled circus music.

=== 2003 rearrangement and proposed renaming ===
In July 2003, it was reported in the Malaysian press that the anthem would be rearranged for the second time and the title and incipit would be changed from Negaraku to Malaysiaku (meaning "My Malaysia"). There was a public outcry of dismay and the move was scrapped, but the anthem was re-arranged and returned to the pre-1992 time signature by composer Wah Idris.

== Lyrics ==
Malay original

Negaraku,
Tanah tumpahnya darahku,
Rakyat hidup,
Bersatu dan maju!

𝄆 Rahmat bahagia,
Tuhan kurniakan,
Raja kita,
Selamat bertakhta! 𝄇

Jawi script (unofficial)

نݢاراکو،
تانه تومڤهڽ دارهکو،
رعيت هيدوڤ،
برساتو دان ماجو!

𝄇 رحمة بهاݢيا،
توهن کورنياکن،
راج کيت،
سلامت برتختا! 𝄆

IPA transcription (Note: See Help:IPA/Malay and Malay phonology.)

[nə.ga.ra.ku]
[ta.nah tum.pah.ɲa da.rah.ku]
[raʔ.jat̚ hi.dup]
[bər.sa.tu dan ma.d͡ʒu]

𝄆 [rah.mat̚ ba.ha.gja]
[tu.han kur.ni.a.kan]
[ra.d͡ʒa ki.ta]
[sə.la.mat̚ bər.tax.ta] 𝄇

English translation

My motherland,
The land where my blood spills,
The people live,
United and progressive!

𝄆 With God's blessings
of grace and happiness,
May our King,
be safely enthroned! 𝄇

== Etiquette ==
=== Individual conduct ===
Failure to comply with Section 8 (1) of the National Anthem Act 1968 without good and sufficient cause, and any act or omission which lowers the Anthem's prestige in the eyes of the public is legally construed as a show of disrespect. Any person who knowingly shows disrespect towards the Anthem in any public place shall be liable to a fine not exceeding MYR100 or a prison term not exceeding one month.

== Other songs with same melody ==
Three gramophone record versions have been released in the following titles bearing the similar tune of the Malaysian anthem:

1930s

"Mamula Moon" was pressed on Parlophone Records in the 1930s, performed by British Band Legend, Geraldo and His Orchestra, with vocals by Danny Vaughn. This love song was performed using jazz instruments on a foxtrot dance beat.

1940s

"I Shall Return" was recorded by Anne Shelton in the late 1940s, by Pickwick Music Ltd, published on Decca.

1950s

The song was also recorded by the Sydney Latin band leader Paul Lombard (also known as Paul Lombard and His Orchestra), as "Malayan Moon" in 1952 with lyrics sung by Joan Wilton (in English) and Geoff Brooke (in Malay), released by Columbia Records in Sydney as D0-3460. The significance of this piece of recording, which is only playable on gramophones running at 78 rpm speed, is that the background music is conducted so similarly to the Malayan style of music background, setting the originality and authentic Malayan atmosphere to the tune. The song was performed by non-natives (Australians) singing in both English and Malay. The lyrics present a love story setting between the two lovers. The B-side of the record is "Planting Rice", loosely based on the Filipino folk song Magtanim Ay 'Di Biro, also performed by Paul Lombard accompanied by a vocal chorus by Joan Wilton. This piece of music was copyrighted by Southern Music Co. of Sydney.

== See also ==
- "Allah Lanjutkan Usia Sultan"
- "Terang Bulan"
- State anthems of Malaysia
