= Terang Bulan =

Traditional Indonesian folk song

Song
- Genre: traditional Malay

Audio sample
- Instrumental version in A-flat major: file; help

"Terang Bulan" (lit. '"Bright Moon"') is a traditional Malay song. The song is an adaptation based on the state anthem of Perak named "Allah Lanjutkan Usia Sultan" which translates to "God Lengthen the Sultan's Age". The song's melody was originally from "La Rosalie", a popular song in the Seychelles in the 19th century composed by French lyricist Pierre Jean de Béranger (1780-1857).

== History ==
The melody of the song was first brought to the Malay World by Sultan Abdullah Muhammad Shah II of Perak, who was exiled to the island of Mahé, in what is now Seychelles, in the mid of 1870s for abetting the murder of the British Resident James W. W. Birch. During that time La Rosalie, a popular song by French lyricist, Pierre-Jean de Béranger became a popular French melody prominent on the island.

Sultan Abdullah Muhammad Shah II of Perak later adopted the melody as the Perak Royal Anthem, titled "Allah Lanjutkan Usia Sultan" through his children who had visited him. Historian Mubin Sheppard insists that the song was inaugurated as the Perak state song in 1888 when Sultan Abdullah's eldest son was invited to London by Queen Victoria.

Following the melody's popularity, the lyrics have been changed and titled Terang Bulan. It was performed by a group of nobles of the Dutch East Indies and became a popular Malay folk song at parties and cabarets from the 1920s to 1930s in Singapore, Malay Peninsula, and later spread to other Malay Archipelago which consists of Indonesia in the present day.

Since the independence of Federation of Malaya in 1957, the melody of the Perak's state anthem "Allah Lanjutkan Usia Sultan" has been used as the melody of the national anthem of the Federation of Malaya which is Malaysia in present-day entitled Negaraku. Public performances of the song and its melody have been outlawed, as any such use is proscribed by statute.

== Claims regarding Indonesian origins ==
It has been claimed that Terang Bulan was initially written in Indonesian. However, the song was composed in the early 1920s, predating the formal recognition of the Indonesian language as the national language of Indonesia following the country's independence in 1945.

During the Indonesia–Malaysia confrontation (1963–1966), Terang Bulan was reportedly played and sung by some Indonesians, which was perceived as mocking Malaysia's national anthem.

== Lyrics ==
Original Malay

Terang bulan, terang di pinggir kali
Buaya timbul disangkalah mati
Jangan percaya mulutnya lelaki
Berani sumpah 'tapi takut mati

Waktu potong padi di tengah sawah
Sambil bernyanyi riuh rendah
Memotong padi semua orang
Sedari pagi sampai petang

Waktu potong padi di tengah sawah
Sambil bernyanyi riuh rendah
Bersenang hati sambil bersuka
Tolonglah kami bersama sama

IPA transcription (Note: Help:IPA/Malay.)

[tə.raŋ bu.lan tə.raŋ di piŋ.gir ka.li]
[bu.a.ja tim.bul di.saŋ.ka.lah ma.ti]
[d͡ʒa.ŋan pər.t͡ʃa.ja mu.lut.ɲa lə.la.ki]
[bə.ra.ni sum.pah ta.pi ta.kut ma.ti]

[waʔ.tu po.toŋ pa.di di tə.ŋah sa.wah]
[sam.bil bər.ɲa.ɲi ri.uh rən.dah]
[mə.mo.toŋ pa.di sə.mu.a o.raŋ]
[sə.da.ri pa.gi sam.pai pə.taŋ]

[waʔ.tu po.toŋ pa.di di tə.ŋah sa.wah]
[sam.bil bər.ɲa.ɲi ri.uh rən.dah]
[bər.sə.naŋ ha.ti sam.bil bər.su.ka]
[to.loŋ.lah ka.mi bər.sa.ma sa.ma]

Translation (literal)

The moon is shining, moon shine reflects on the river
Floating crocodile thought to be dead
Don't believe man's word
Dare to pledge but afraid of dying

Whilst harvesting paddy in the field
Singing gaily
Everybody is harvesting paddy
morning past to evening (unnoticed)

Whilst harvesting paddy in the field
Singing gaily
Heart at ease while having fun
Help us together

== Other versions ==
Several lyrics set to the tune exist, with their meanings being very similar.

Felix Mendelssohn & His Hawaiian Serenaders used the tune of Terang Bulan in their song Mamula Moon, on their 1947 album Paradise Isle.

=== Dutch version ===
Dutch singer Zangeres Zonder Naam recorded a Dutch version of "Terang Bulan" (spelt Terang Boelan]). The meaning in the Dutch version is entirely different from the original lyrics, although the Dutch version mentions the island of Java.

Dutch lyrics

Terang boelan de maan schijnt over Java
En aan het strang zit Nunja heel alleen
Ze denkt nog altijd aan haar Tuan Blanda
die met zijn schip zolang van haar verdween

Hij had beloofd dat hij terug zou komen
maar wat hij zei dat bleek helaas niet waar
Ze zijn voorbij haar mooie toekomst dromen
haar hart doet pijn 't leven valt zo zwaar

Toch is er iets dat haar nog vreugd kan geven
dat is haar kind met ogen hemelsblauw
De zon die scheen weer even in haar leven
als ut kindje zegt ik blijf voorgoed bij jou

Translation (literal)

The moon is shining, the moon is shining above Java
Nunja is sitting all alone at the beach
Still thinking about her Dutch Master
Who disappeared long ago with his ship

He promised to return
But what he said, turned out to be not true, unfortunately
It's all over, her beautiful dreams about the future
Her heart hurts, life is so heavy

However, there's still something that can bring her joy
That is her child with eyes so navy blue
The sun shone for a while in her life
When the child said: 'I will stay forever with you'

== Other adaptations ==
=== Malaysian National Anthem ===
Tunku Abdul Rahman, the Chief Minister and Minister for Home Affairs of the Federation of Malaya, selected Perak's state anthem as the Federation's national hymn, on account of its "traditional flavour". The tune was rechristened "Negaraku" and the lyrics were changed, with popular performances in cabarets and parties halting as it became proscribed by statute. When Malaysia was formed in 1963, the song remained the national anthem.
