= Simpang (disambiguation) =

Simpang is a planning area in the North Region of Singapore.

Simpang may also refer to:

- Simpang, Perak, suburb of Taiping, Perak, Malaysia
- Simpang Airport, former airport in Malaysia
