= Raja Chulan =

Malay nobleman and administrator (1869–1933)

Raja Chulan راج چولن
- Raja Di-Hilir Perak
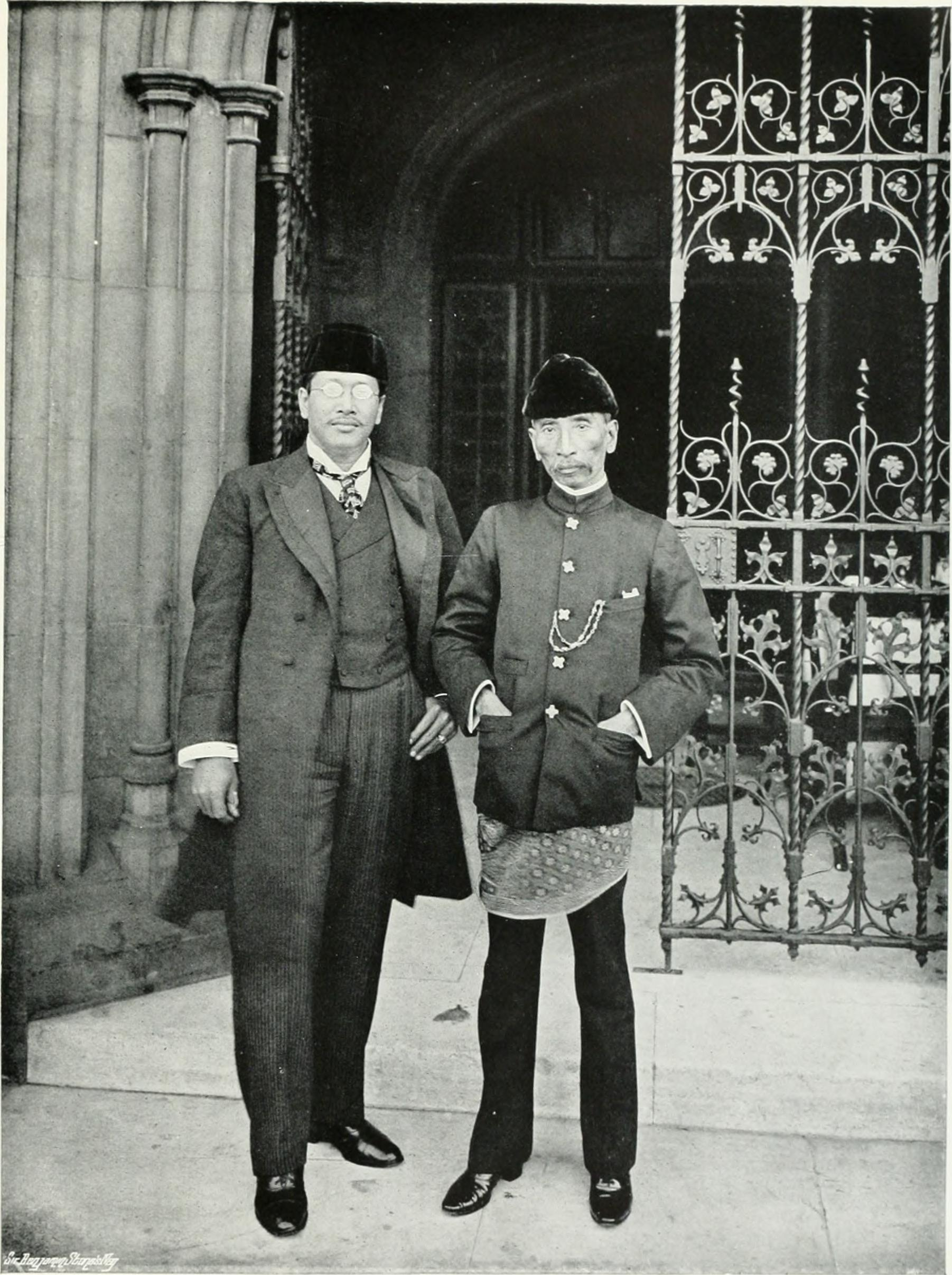
- Raja Chulan (left) accompanying Sultan Idris Shah I of Perak (right) in London at the Houses of Parliament, 1906.
- Born: 1 July 1869; Tanjung Brambang, Krian, Perak
- Died: 10 April 1933 (aged 63); Kuala Kangsar, Perak
- Burial: Al-Ghufran Royal Mausoleum, Kuala Kangsar, Perak
Names
- Raja Sir Chulan ibni Almarhum Sultan Abdullah Muhammad Shah II Habibullah
- House: Siak-Perak
- Father: Abdullah Muhammad Shah II of Perak
- Mother: Raja Tipah Binti Almarhum Sultan Shahabuddin Ri'ayat Shah Saifullah
- Religion: Sunni Islam

Raja Chulan ibni Almarhum Sultan Abdullah Muhammad Shah II Habibullah KBE CMG (Jawi: راج چولن ابن المرحوم سلطان عبد الله محمد شاه كدوا حبيب الله, July 1869 – 10 April 1933) was a member of the Perak royal family and administrator.

== Early life and family ==
He was born on 1 July 1869 at Tanjung Brambang, Krian. He was the second son of Sultan Abdullah Muhammad Shah II and Raja Tipah Binti Almarhum Sultan Shahabuddin Ri'ayat Shah Saifullah.

== Education ==
Raja Chulan received his early education at the Raffles Institution in Singapore at the age of 7 in 1876. Just a year after, his father Sultan Abdullah Muhammad Shah II was exiled to the Seychelles Island for his involvement in the murder of the first British Resident of Perak, J.W.W. Birch. Raja Chulan later continued his secondary education at the Malacca High School in 1882.

== Career ==
At 17 years old, he joined the State Secretariat Kuala Kangsar and serve the office for 3 years. In 1889, Raja Chulan went to Seychelles Island to meet his family members in exile after their involvement in the assassination of J.W.W. Birch. Upon returning to Perak, Raja Chulan was appointed as Settlement Officer for Kurau, and later as Settlement Officer for Parit Buntar cum Magistrate. He joined with the British, as well as with the sultans of Perak, Selangor, Negeri Sembilan and Pahang to form a federation, dubbed the Federated Malay States, on 1 July 1896, the foundation around which the later Federation of Malaya was eventually formed.

On 1 December 1920, Raja Chulan was conferred the title of Raja Di-Hilir Perak by Sultan Iskandar after the British lifted sanctions on the succession of the Perak monarchy previously placed his father, the exiled Sultan Abdullah.

Beginning in 1920, local rulers in British Malaya, led by Sultan Iskandar of Perak, Tuanku Muhammad of Negeri Sembilan, Raja Chulan, and Abdullah Dahan of Rembau urged the British Colonial Office to raise an infantry regiment composed of local Malays, leading to the eventual formation of Royal Malay Regiment. He later became a member of the Federal Law Committee in 1924.

== Death and legacy ==
He died on 10 April 1933 and was buried in the Al-Ghufran Royal Mausoleum, Kuala Kangsar, Perak.

In Kuala Lumpur, there is a street named Jalan Raja Chulan (formerly Weld Road) which was renamed after him in 1982, as well as a monorail station along that street.

== Honours ==
- United Kingdom
  - Honorary Knight of the Order of the British Empire (KBE) (1 January 1930)
  - Honorary Companion of the Order of St Michael and St George (CMG) (1925 Birthday Honours)
