= Kota Ngah Ibrahim =

Fort in Malaysia

Coordinates: 4°48′44.5″N 100°40′31.7″E

Ngah Ibrahim's Fort
- Kota Ngah Ibrahim (in Malay)
- Larut, Matang and Selama District, Malaysia
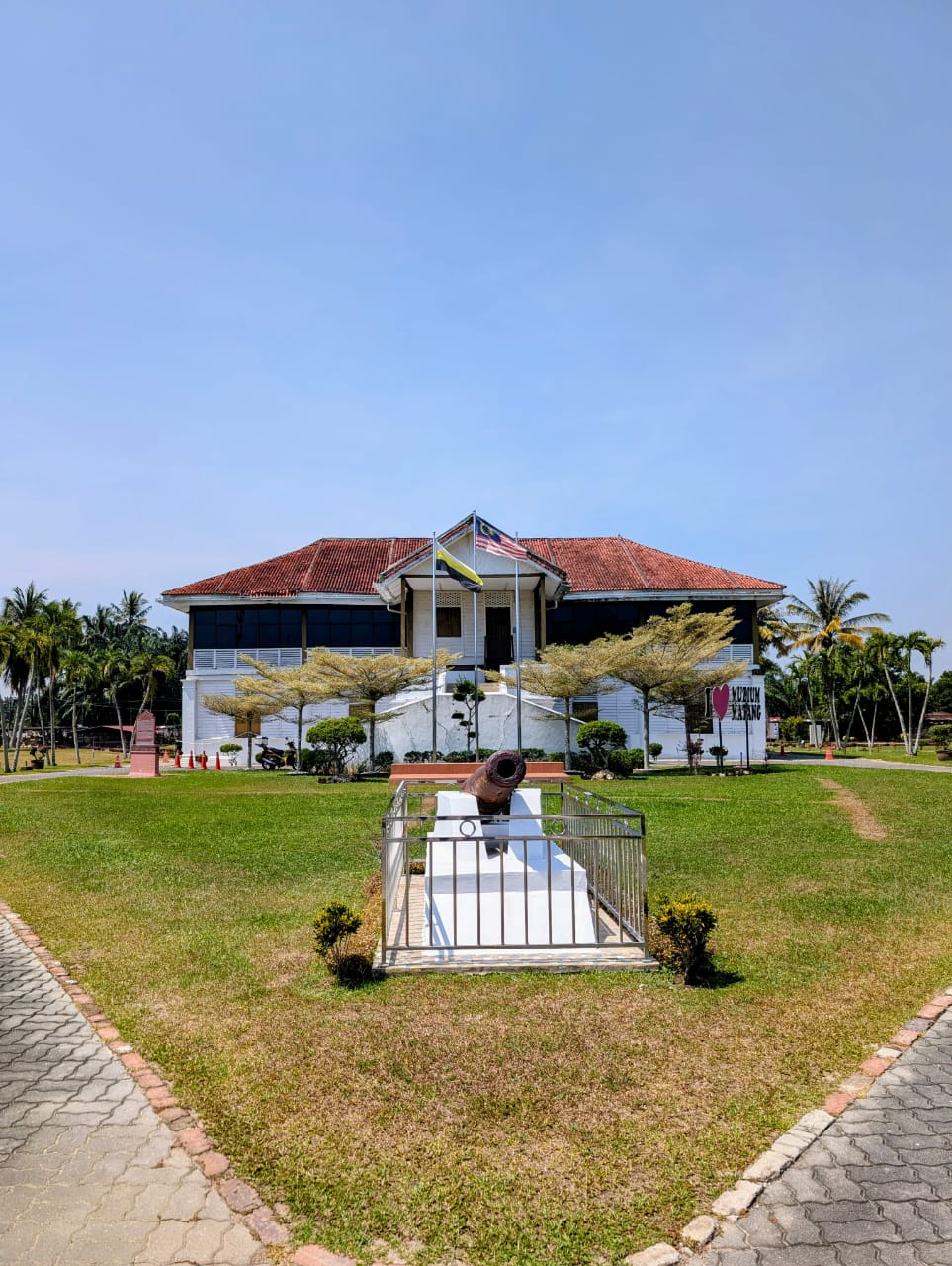
- The Kota Ngah Ibrahim complex.

Site information
- Open to the public: Yes

Site history
- Built: ca. 1870
- Built by: Ngah Ibrahim
- In use: 1870-now

Garrison information
- Past commanders: Ngah Ibrahim

Kota Ngah Ibrahim or Ngah Ibrahim's Fort is a fort of historical value in Taiping, Larut, Matang and Selama District, Perak, Malaysia. The fort is located at Jalan Taiping-Kuala Sepetang road near Matang town. The complex is now known as Matang Museum.

== History ==
The fort was built in the 1870s as the private residence of Ngah Ibrahim, Raja Larut of Perak. The fort was square in shape with walls as tall as 2.5 metre. The fort was built in European style and covers 10,000 square meter.Bricks and cement were used as building blocks. The fort houses cannon, rifles, gunpowder and spear, among others. The complex was built nearby Sungai Larut, to enable easy access to his four fire ship.

He also hired Tristram Speedy as his police chief, alongside 110 sepoy to further strengthen defence of his fortress.

After the murder of J.W.W. Birch, the first British Resident in Perak at Pasir Salak on 2 November 1875, the fort became a court for the trial of Birch's murder. Dato Maharajalela, Dato' Sagor, Sepuntum and Pandak Indut were found guilty and were sentenced to death by hanging at the court on 21 January 1877. Ngah Ibrahim, Sultan Abdullah and other statesmen were exiled to Seychelles in the Indian Ocean. Ngah Ibrahim died on 1887 in Singapore and was buried at the Masjid Al-Junied cemetery. However, on 7 September 2006, Ngah Ibrahim's body was brought back to Perak and reburied within the fort.

In the 1900s, the court was moved to a new building at Taiping. In 1913, the house was turned into the first Teachers' Training College for Malay teachers, known as the Matang College. Ten years later on 1923, the college was closed for the new Sultan Idris Training College in Tanjung Malim. Subsequently, the residence was turned into a primary school, Sekolah Rendah Kebangsaan Matang. During the Japanese occupation in 1941, the Japanese Imperial Army made the fort its headquarters and war strategic operations centre. After the Japanese surrendered in 1945, the fort was turned again into Sekolah Rendah Kebangsaan Matang until 1982 when the school was moved to the new building near the fort. From 1987, this fort was taken over by the Perak Museum Department as a state historical site known as Kota Ngah Ibrahim Historical Complex.

== Features ==
- House of Tristram Speedy
- Balai Penghulu Matam (Malaysia first courthouse)
- The cell of Dato' Sagor
- Ruins of fort
- The grave of Dato' Ngah Ibrahim (relocated from Singapore on 7 September 2006)
