= Bright Moon =

Bright Moon may refer to:

- Terang Bulan, a Malay-language song
- Bright Moon Song and Dance Troupe, Shanghai music and dance group active in the 1920s and 1930s
