= Perak War =

19th century colonial war in Malaysia

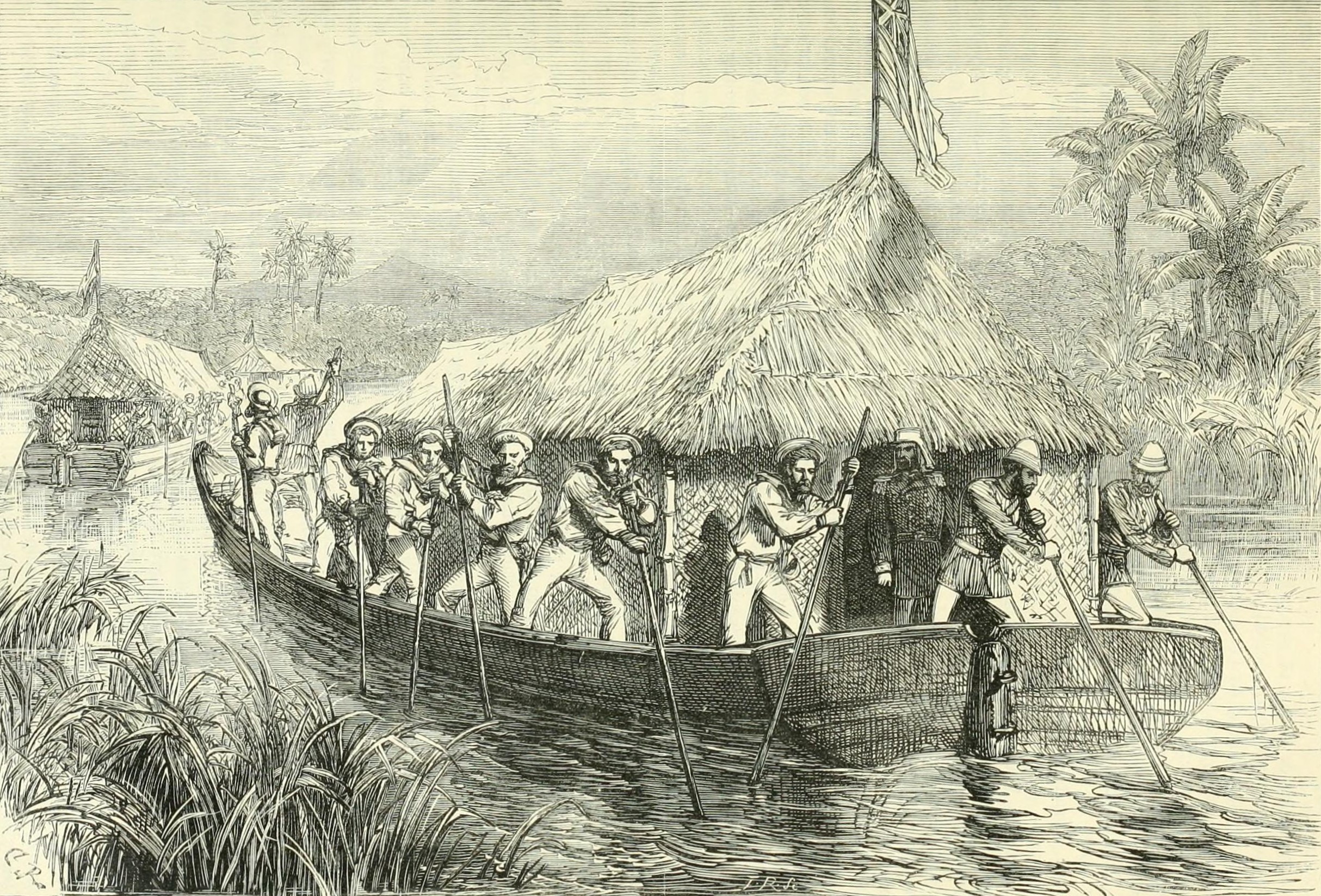
- A contemporary illustration of Blue-jackets and marines poling the British expedition up the Perak river.
Date	1875–1877
Location	Perak
Result	British victory

Belligerents
United Kingdom	Sultanate of Perak; Perakian Malays

Commanders and leaders
Major General Francis Colbourne	Sultan Abdullah II; Lela Pandak Lam; Ngah Ibrahim; Other Malay chiefs

Units involved
British Army; 10th Regiment; 80th Regiment; Malay scouts; Sikh soldiers; Colonial Penang Police; Royal Navy; Royal Marines; Royal Artillery; rest are unknown	Unknown

Strength
1,205 total men	1,506+ total men

The Perak War (1875–1877) took place between British and local forces in Perak, a state in northwestern Malaysia. The sultan of Lower Perak and other local chiefs attempted to end foreign influence in the region and remove the British administrator James W. W. Birch. Following the killing of Birch in 1875, British forces defeated the followers of Lela Pandak Lam.

== Background ==
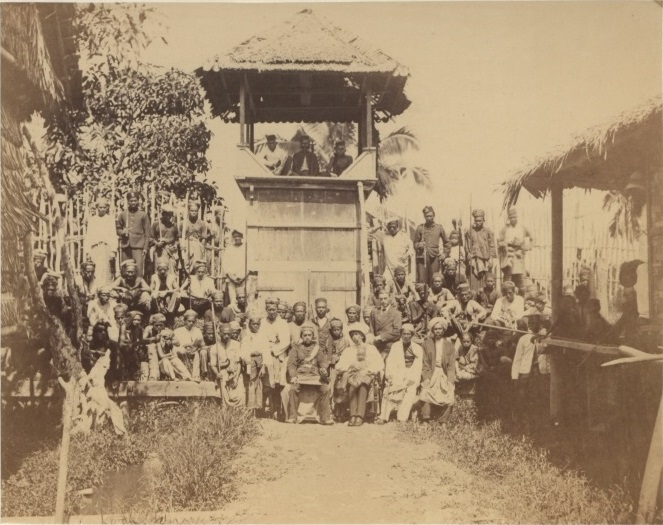
Sultan Abdullah II with Dato Sagor and Birch, 1874.

In the 19th-century, the Malay sultanates gradually came under the control of the British Empire. Officially the British pursued an abolitionist policy in all areas under their control after Slavery Abolition Act 1833. From the 1870s, when the British felt their power was secure enough to introduce policies they felt would be unpopular, they actively started to pursue an abolitionist policy against slavery in Malaya.

There was a high level of tension between Sultan Abdullah and the first British resident of Perak, James W. W. Birch. Abdullah once conducted a seance to discover whether jinns would remove the 'white oppressors'. On another occasion, he ordered the services of a spirit medium to rid him of Birch and other 'light eyed men'. A Malay delegation met with Governor-General Andrew Clarke in Singapore "to prevent the Resident from interfering with religion and custom, from acting without consulting Sultan and chiefs, and from depriving them of their property, namely fugitive slaves and feudal dues." Clarke had already observed on 25 March 1875 that, "I am very much annoyed with Birch and the heads-over-heels way in which he does things; he and I will come to sorrow yet, if he does not mind." Due to unfavourable responses, on 21 July 1875 Abdullah called a meeting of chiefs where after discussing poisoning Birch, they accepted Lela Pandak Lam's offer to stab Birch to death.

After the assassination of Birch, local Malays first planned on attacking Bandar Bahru on the night of 2 November, but the plan was aborted due to heavy rain. British reinforcements started to arrive from Hong Kong and Burma by 6 November. A skirmish happened near a Malay-held stockade near Bandar Tua, Perak on 7 November 1875 involving around 106 British soldiers. This was the first battle in the war. Encountering unexpected resistance, the battle ended with the retreat of the British detachment, who lost 4 men including Captain Innes. Reinforcements were sent, and 300 men soon arrived in the state with 80 boats. Most of the forces came from India and Hong Kong.

== War ==
=== Battle of Bandar Tua ===
The British attacked Lela Pandak Lam's stronghold in Pasir Salak on 7 November, 1875, but were stopped at Kampung Biak. In Lakaran Melayu by Sir Frank Swettenham, the bravery of two Malay scouts, Nakodah Orlong and Alang, is described. Nakodah Orlong was killed in the ambush. Alang defended his leader's body throughout the day and eventually brought it back to the base by swimming in the river. The attack failed for the British, with many wounded and killed.

=== Siege of Pasir Salak ===
On the 15 November 1875, the British army arrived at Pasir Salak. The place was well defended, with a fort that had a six-foot rampart, coupled with a wooden wall on top and with a trench filled with sharpened spikes and traps. The warriors had several lantaka with them, alongside some muskets. The British attacked relentlessly, but the first attack failed, killing Captain Innes. The British were later successful and captured the fort on 12 December. Pasir Salak was razed by the soldiers under orders from William Jervois.

=== Battle of Kota Lama Kanan ===
The warriors, under Lela Pandak Lam, soon retreated to Sayong. The British followed them, attacking enemy forts and villages on the way. Then, on 4 January 1876, they were ambushed at Kota Lama Kanan, Sayong. Brigadier H.J. Hawkins was killed during the fight.

== Aftermath ==
Soon, the warriors began to lose strength. By mid-1876, the war ended with the capture of prominent leaders and warriors, such as Lela Pandak Lam, Sultan Abdullah II and Ngah Ibrahim. The former was captured and hanged in Matang with two followers in 1877, while the latter two were exiled to the Seychelles. Thus ended any direct opposition over British control of Perak.
