= Malaysia Federal Route 3146 =

Road in Malaysia

Federal Route 3146
- Jalan Kamunting Lama

Route information
- Maintained by Malaysian Public Works Department

Major junctions
- West end: Taiping (North)
- North–South Expressway Northern Route / AH2; FT 1 Federal Route 1 FT 171 Federal Route 171; FT 74 Federal Route 74
- East end: Kamunting

Location
- Country: Malaysia
- Primary destinations: Taiping, Bukit Larut

Highway system
- Highways in Malaysia; Expressways; Federal; State

Federal Route 3146, Jalan Kamunting Lama or Old Kamunting Road (Previously Perak State Route A2) is a industrial federal road in Perak, Malaysia.

== Junction lists ==
The entire route is located in Larut, Matang and Selama District, Perak.

Legend:

- I/C - Interchange, I/S - Intersection, RSA - Rest and service area, OBR - Overhead bridge restaurant, R/R - Restaurant and rest plaza, L/B - Layby, V/P - Vista point, TN - tunnel, T/P - Toll plaza, BR - Bridge
- C - Cloverleaf, S - Stack, T-A - Trumpet-A, T-B - Trumpet-B, DT - Directional-T/Y, SDT - Semi-Directional-T/Y, P-Y - Partial-Y, D - Diamond, P-C - Partial cloverleaf, D-D - Diverging diamond, D-R - Direct ramp

Location	km	mi	Name	Destinations	Notes
Taiping			Taiping (North)-NSE I/C	North–South Expressway Northern Route / AH2 – Bukit Kayu Hitam, Penang, Bukit Merah, Changkat Jering, Ipoh, Kuala Lumpur	Trumpet interchange
Taiping			Taiping (North) Toll Plaza		
Taiping			Taiping (North)	FT 1 Malaysia Federal Route 1 – Penang, Bagan Serai, Simpang, Kuala Sepetang, Kuala Kangsar	Junctions
Kamunting			Kamunting tin mines		
Kamunting			Railway crossing		
Kamunting			Taman Kamunting Bistari 2		
Kamunting			Kampung Jana Sambungan		
Kamunting			Kamunting	FT 171 Malaysia Federal Route 171 – Kubu Gajah, Selama, Taiping town centre FT 74 Malaysia Federal Route 74 – Bukit Larut (Maxwell Hill)	Junctions
1.000 mi = 1.609 km; 1.000 km = 0.621 mi: Electronic toll collection
