= National anthem =

Song that represents a country or nation

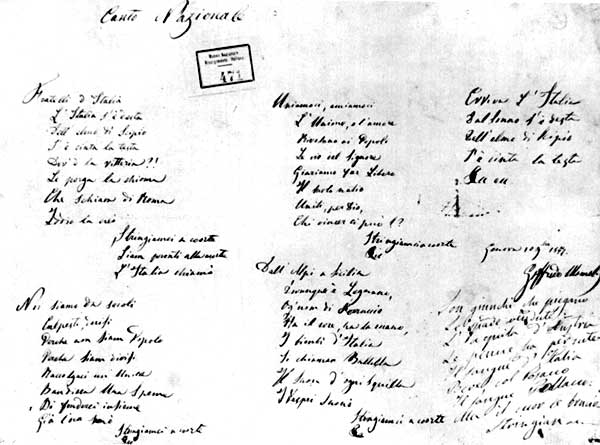
Holographic copy of 1847 of Il Canto degli Italiani, the Italian national anthem since 1946

A national anthem is a patriotic musical composition symbolizing and evoking eulogies of the history and traditions of a country or nation. The majority of national anthems are marches or hymns in style. Some countries that are devolved into multiple constituent states have their own official musical compositions for them (such as with the United Kingdom and the Soviet Union); their constituencies' songs are sometimes referred to as national anthems even though they are not sovereign states.

== History ==
In the early modern period, some European monarchies adopted royal anthems, with several having survived into current use. "God Save the King/Queen", first performed in 1619, remains the royal anthem of the United Kingdom and the Commonwealth realms. La Marcha Real was adopted as the royal anthem of the Spanish monarchy in 1770 and as the national anthem of Spain in 1939. Denmark has retained its royal anthem, Kong Christian stod ved højen mast (1780) alongside its national anthem (Der er et yndigt land, adopted in 1835).

In 1795, the French First Republic adopted La Marseillaise as its national anthem by decree, making France the first country in history to have an official national anthem. Some anthems are older in origin but were not officially adopted until the 19th or 20th century. For example, the lyrics of the Japanese national anthem, Kimigayo, were taken from a Heian period (794–1185) poem, but were not set to music until 1880. The national anthem of the Netherlands, the Wilhelmus, contains a melody and lyrics dating back to the 16th century, but it was not officially adopted as the country's national anthem until 1932.

During the early 19th century, it became common for newly formed nations to define national anthems, notably as a result of the Latin American wars of independence, for Argentina (1813), Peru (1821), Brazil (1831), but also in Europe for Belgium (1830). Consequently, adoption of national anthems prior to the 1930s was mostly by newly formed or newly independent states, such as the First Portuguese Republic (A Portuguesa, 1911), the Kingdom of Greece ("Hymn to Liberty", 1865), the First Philippine Republic (Marcha Nacional Filipina, 1898), Lithuania (Tautiška giesmė, 1919), Weimar Germany (Deutschlandlied, 1922), Ireland (Amhrán na bhFiann, 1926) and Greater Lebanon ("Lebanese National Anthem", 1927).

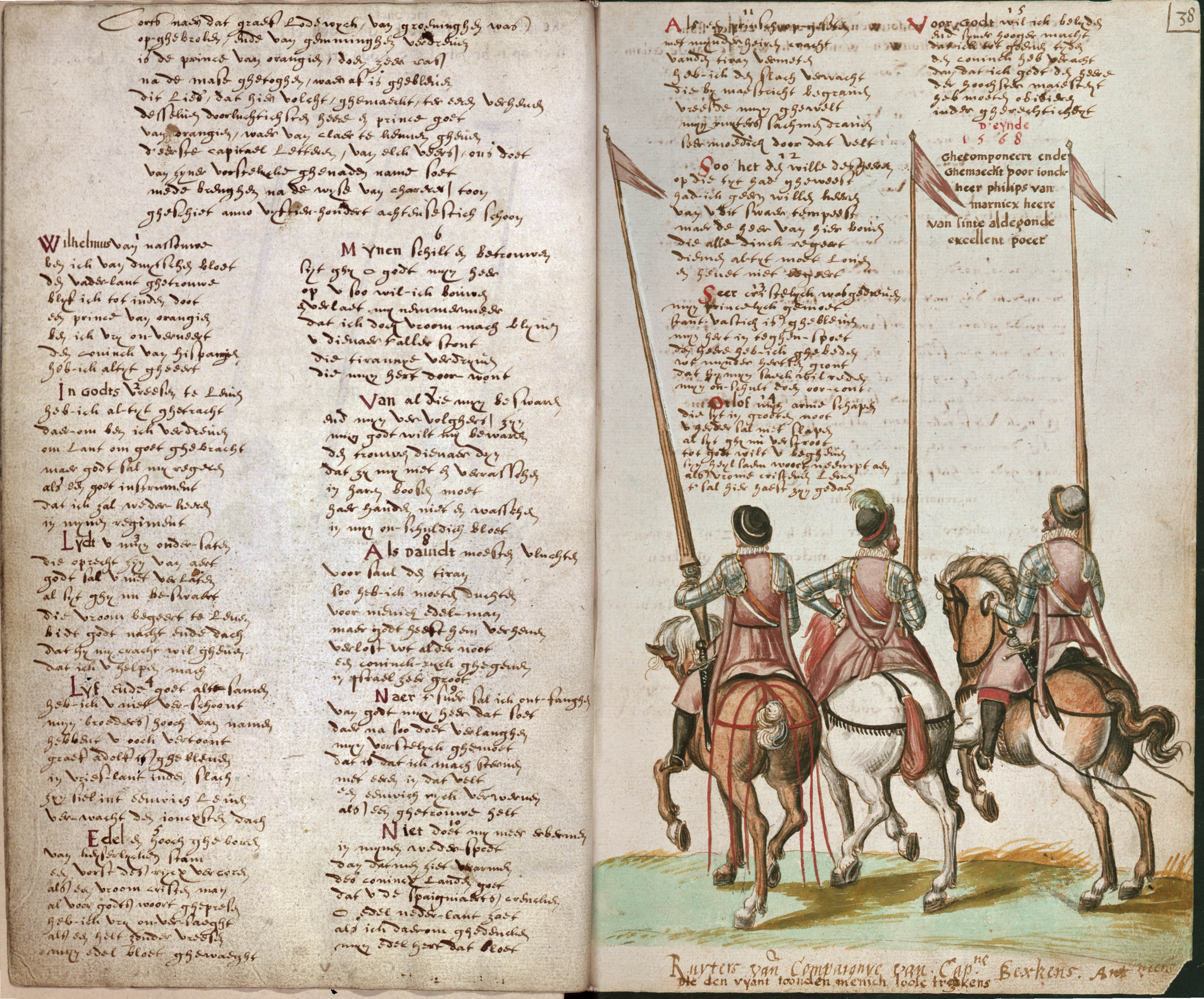
Early version of the "Wilhelmus" as preserved in a manuscript of 1617 (Brussels, Royal Library, MS 15662, fol. 37v–38r)

"Il Canto degli Italiani" was written by Goffredo Mameli and set to music by Michele Novaro in 1847, currently used as the national anthem of Italy. The song was very popular during Italian unification and the following decades. However, after the Kingdom of Italy's 1861 proclamation, the republican and Jacobin connotations of "Il Canto degli Italiani" were difficult to reconcile with the new state's monarchic constitution. The kingdom chose instead "Marcia Reale" (Royal March), the House of Savoy's official anthem, composed by order of King Charles Albert of Sardinia in 1831. After World War II, Italy became a republic. On 12 October 1946, it chose "Il Canto degli Italiani" as a provisional national anthem. The song would retain this role as de facto anthem of the Italian Republic, and after several unsuccessful attempts, gained de jure status on 4 December 2017.

The Olympic Charter of 1920 introduced the ritual of playing the national anthems of the gold medal winners. From this time, the playing of national anthems became increasingly popular at international sporting events, creating an incentive for such nations that did not yet have an officially defined national anthem to introduce one. (Note: A Welsh patriotic song, Hen Wlad Fy Nhadau, was sung in a rugby game against New Zealand in Llanelli in 1905, and came to be regarded as "unofficial national anthem of Wales" after this event.)

The United States introduced the patriotic song The Star-Spangled Banner as a national anthem in 1931. Following this, several nations moved to adopt as official national anthem patriotic songs that had already been in de facto use at official functions, such as Mexico (Mexicanos, al grito de guerra, composed 1854, adopted 1943) and Switzerland ("Swiss Psalm", composed 1841, de facto use from 1961, adopted 1981).

By the period of decolonisation in the 1960s, it had become common practice for newly independent nations to adopt an official national anthem. Some of these anthems were specifically commissioned, such as the anthem of Kenya, Ee Mungu Nguvu Yetu, produced by a dedicated "Kenyan Anthem Commission" in 1963.

A number of nations remain without an official national anthem adopted de jure. In these cases, there are established de facto anthems played at sporting events or diplomatic receptions. These include the United Kingdom (God Save the King) and Sweden (Du gamla, Du fria; the country also has a royal anthem, Kungssången). Countries that have moved to officially adopt de jure their long-standing de facto anthems since the 1990s include: Luxembourg (Ons Heemecht, adopted 1993), South Africa (National anthem of South Africa, adopted 1997) and Israel (Hatikvah, composed 1888, de facto use from 1948, adopted 2004).

== Usage ==
Star-Spangled Banner with the American flag (ca. 1940s). Anthems used during sign-on and sign-off sequences have become less common due to the increasing prevalence of 24-hour-a-day, seven-day-a-week broadcasting.

National anthems are used in a wide array of contexts. Certain etiquette may be involved in the playing of a country's anthem. These usually involve military honours, standing up, removing headwear etc. In diplomatic situations the rules may be very formal. There may also be royal anthems, presidential anthems, state anthems etc. for special occasions.

They are played on national holidays and festivals, and have also come to be closely connected with sporting events. Wales was the first country to adopt this, during a rugby game against New Zealand in 1905. Since then during sporting competitions, such as the Olympic Games, the national anthem of the gold medal winner is played at each medal ceremony; also played before games in many sports leagues, since being adopted in baseball during World War II. When teams from two nations play each other, the anthems of both nations are played, the host nation's anthem being played last.

In some countries, the national anthem is played to students each day at the start and/or end of school as an exercise in patriotism, such as in Tanzania. In other countries the state anthem may be played in a theatre before a play or in a cinema before a movie. Many radio and television stations have adopted this and play the national anthem when they sign on in the morning and again when they sign off at night. For instance, the national anthem of China is played before the broadcast of evening news on Hong Kong's local television stations including TVB Jade. In Colombia, it is a law to play the National Anthem at 6:00 and 18:00 on every public radio and television station, while in Thailand, "Phleng Chat Thai" is played at 08:00 and 18:00 nationwide (the Royal Anthem is used for sign-ons and closedowns instead), also in Indonesia, Indonesia Raya is played at 06:00 on national television networks started from December 11, 2024 as mandated by president Prabowo Subianto, while TVRI is the only national television that played it twice at 06:00 and 18:00. The use of a national anthem outside of its country, however, is dependent on the international recognition of that country. For instance, Taiwan has not been recognized by the International Olympic Committee as a separate nation since 1979 and must compete as Chinese Taipei; its "National Banner Song" is used instead of its national anthem. In Taiwan, the country's national anthem is sung before instead of during flag-rising and flag-lowering, followed by the National Banner Song during the actual flag-rising and flag-lowering. Even within a state, the state's citizenry may interpret the national anthem differently (such as in the United States some view the U.S. national anthem as representing respect for dead soldiers and policemen whereas others view it as honouring the country generally).

Various solutions may be used when countries with different national anthems compete in a unified team. When North Korea and South Korea participated together in the 2018 Winter Olympics, the folk song "Arirang", beloved on both sides of the border and seen as a symbol of Korea as a whole, was used as an anthem instead of the national anthem of either state.

== Creators ==
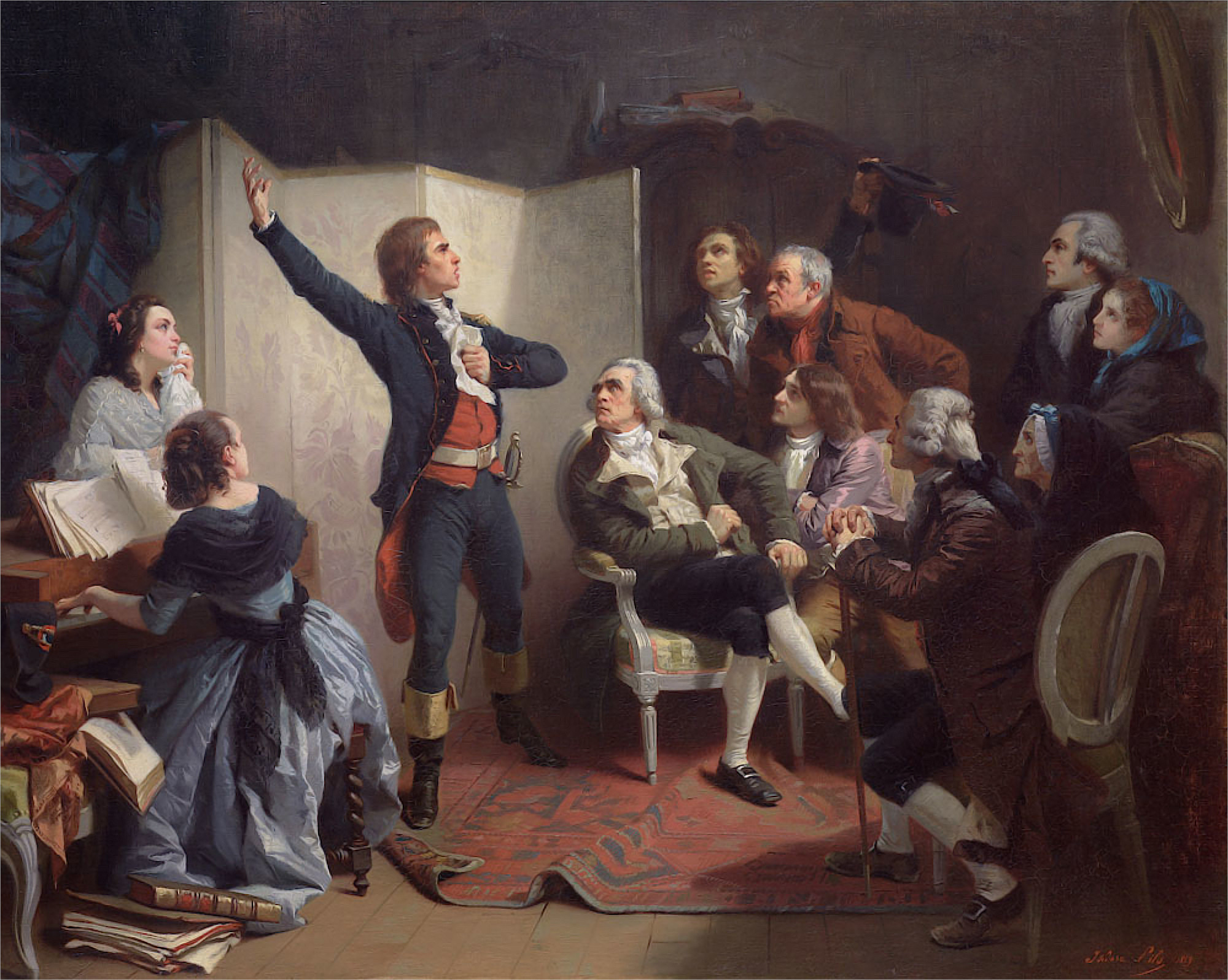
Rouget de Lisle performing "La Marseillaise" for the first time

Most of the best-known national anthems were written by little-known or unknown composers such as Claude Joseph Rouget de Lisle, composer of "La Marseillaise" and John Stafford Smith who wrote the tune for "The Anacreontic Song", which became the tune for the U.S. national anthem, "The Star-Spangled Banner". The author of "God Save the King", one of the oldest and best-known anthems in the world, is unknown and disputed.

Very few countries have a national anthem written by a world-renowned composer. Exceptions include Germany, whose anthem "Das Lied der Deutschen" uses a melody written by Joseph Haydn, and Austria, whose national anthem "Land der Berge, Land am Strome" is sometimes credited to Wolfgang Amadeus Mozart. The music of the "Pontifical Anthem", anthem of the Vatican City, was composed in 1869 by Charles Gounod, for the golden jubilee of Pope Pius IX's priestly ordination. When Armenia was under Soviet rule, its anthem, the "Anthem of the Armenian Soviet Socialist Republic" used a melody by Aram Khachaturian.

The committee charged with choosing a national anthem for the Federation of Malaya (later Malaysia) at independence decided to invite selected composers of international repute to submit compositions for consideration, including Benjamin Britten, William Walton, Gian Carlo Menotti and Zubir Said, who later composed "Majulah Singapura", the national anthem of Singapore. None were deemed suitable. The tune eventually selected was (and still is) the anthem of the constituent state of Perak, which was in turn adopted from a popular French melody titled "La Rosalie" composed by the lyricist Pierre-Jean de Béranger.

A few anthems have words by Nobel laureates in literature. The first Asian laureate, Rabindranath Tagore, wrote the words and music of "Jana Gana Mana" (the first stanza of the original song "Bharoto Bhagyo Bidhata") and "Amar Shonar Bangla", later adopted as the national anthems of India and Bangladesh respectively. Both songs are originally composed in Bengali. Tagore is the only individual to have written the national anthems of two countries. The national anthem of Sri Lanka, "Nama Nama Sri Lanka Mata," is also directly influenced by Rabindranath Tagore. While Tagore didn't compose the anthem himself, he inspired his student, Ananda Samarakoon, who wrote the music and lyrics, and translated them into Sinhala. Tagore initially composed the song in Bengali and melody in 1938. Bjørnstjerne Bjørnson wrote the lyrics for the Norwegian national anthem "Ja, vi elsker dette landet".

Other countries had their anthems composed by locally important people. This is the case for Colombia, whose anthem's lyrics were written by former president and poet Rafael Nuñez, who also wrote the country's first constitution, in Brazil, whose first anthem, today the Hino da Independência, was composed by the Emperor Pedro I of Brazil, and in Malta, written by Dun Karm Psaila, already a National Poet. A similar case is Liberia, the national anthem of which was written by its third president, Daniel Bashiel Warner.

== Languages ==
A national anthem, when it has lyrics (as is usually the case), is most often in the national or most common language of the country, whether de facto or official, though there are notable exceptions. Most commonly, states with more than one national language may offer several versions of their anthem, for instance:

- The "Swiss Psalm", the national anthem of Switzerland, has different lyrics for each of the country's four official languages (French, German, Italian and Romansh).
- The national anthem of Canada, "O Canada", has official lyrics in both English and French which are not translations of each other, and is frequently sung with a mixture of stanzas, representing the country's bilingual nature. The song itself was originally written in French.
- "Flower of Scotland", the unofficial national anthem of Scotland, features some words in the Scots language.
- "The Soldier's Song", the national anthem of Ireland, was originally written and adopted in English, but an Irish translation, although never formally adopted, is nowadays almost always sung instead, even though only 10.5% of Ireland speaks Irish natively.
- The current South African national anthem is unique in that five of the country's eleven official languages are used in the same anthem (the first stanza is divided between two languages, with each of the remaining three stanzas in a different language). It was created by combining two songs together and then modifying the lyrics and adding new ones.
- The former country of Czechoslovakia combined the two national anthems of the two lands; the first stanza consisting of the first stanza of the Czech anthem "Kde domov můj", and the second stanza consisting of the first stanza of the Slovak anthem "Nad Tatrou sa blýska".
- One of the two official national anthems of New Zealand, "God Defend New Zealand", is now commonly sung with the first verse in Māori ("Aotearoa") and the second in English ("God Defend New Zealand"). The tune is the same but the words are not a direct translation of each other.
- "God Bless Fiji" has lyrics in English and Fijian which are not translations of each other. Although official, the Fijian version is rarely sung, and it is usually the English version that is performed at international sporting events.
- Although Singapore has four official languages, with English being the current lingua franca, the national anthem, "Majulah Singapura" is in Malay and, by law, can only be sung with its original Malay lyrics, despite Malay being a minority language in Singapore. This is because Part XIII of the Constitution of the Republic of Singapore declares, "the national language shall be the Malay language and shall be in the Roman script [...]"
- There are several countries that do not have official lyrics to their national anthems. One of these is the "Marcha Real", the national anthem of Spain. Although unofficial lyrics were once used, those versions were discontinued after successive governmental changes in the 20th century. In 2007, a national competition to write words was held, but no lyrics were chosen. Other national anthems with no words include the anthem of Bosnia and Herzegovina, that of Russia from 1990 to 2000, and that of Kosovo, entitled "Europe". Although the anthem of San Marino, “Terra di Libertà” adopted lyrics in late September 2025, it is ambiguous if it will be used as frequently as others do with their own anthems.
- The national anthem of India, "Jana Gana Mana" has its official lyrics in Bengali; they were adapted from a poem written by Rabindranath Tagore, who also wrote the music.
- Despite the most common language in Wales being English, the unofficial national anthem of Wales, "Hen Wlad Fy Nhadau", is sung in the Welsh language.
- An unofficial national anthem of Finland, "Maamme", was first written in Swedish and only later translated to Finnish. It is nowadays sung in both languages as there is a Swedish speaking minority of about 5% in the country. The national anthem of Estonia, "Mu isamaa, mu õnn ja rõõm" has a similar melody with "Maamme", but only with different lyrics and without repeating the second halves of strophes. The Finlandia Hymn has been repeatedly suggested to be the official national anthem of Finland.
- The national anthem of Pakistan, the "Qaumi Taranah", is unique in that it is entirely in Farsi (Persian) with the exception of one word which is in Urdu, the national language.

== See also ==
- Personal anthem, for a monarch or representative of a monarch, often in addition to a national anthem or being a national anthem itself
- Earth anthem (unofficial), any song or music with the planet Earth in an exalted role
- List of national anthems
- Martial music
- List of former national anthems
- List of regional anthems
