= Andrew Clarke (British Army officer, born 1824) =

British soldier and politician

Lieutenant-General Sir Andrew Clarke GCMG CB CIE
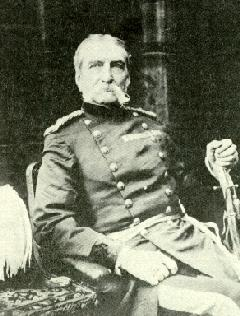
- Lieutenant-Colonel Sir Andrew Clarke, 1873. Photographer: Gustav Richard Lambert; National Archives of Malaysia
- Born: 27 July 1824; Southsea, Hampshire, England
- Died: 29 March 1902 (aged 77); Portland Place, London
- Burial place: Locksbrook Cemetery, Bath, Somerset, England
- Spouse: Mary Margaret MacKillop (m. 1867)
- Military career
- Allegiance: United Kingdom
- Branch: Board of Ordnance; British Army
- Service years: 1844–1886
- Rank: Lieutenant-General
- Service number: 745
- Unit: Corps of Royal Engineers
- Campaigns: New Zealand; Special services, 1848; Perak War
- Awards: New Zealand War Medal; India General Service Medal, Perak clasp Companion of the Most Honourable Order of the Bath, 1869; Knight Commander of the Most Distinguished Order of Saint Michael and Saint George, 1873; Companion of the Order of the Indian Empire, 1878; Commissioner, Colonial and Indian Exhibition, 1886; Knight Grand Cross of the Most Distinguished Order of Saint Michael and Saint George, 1885

Colonel Commandant, Royal Engineers
- In office 1901–1902
- Preceded by: General Charles Fanshawe
- Succeeded by: Lieutenant-General Charles B. Ewart

Inspector-General of Fortifications and Director of Work
- In office 1882–1886
- Preceded by: Thomas Gallwey
- Succeeded by: Lothian Nicholson

9th Governor of Straits Settlements
- In office 4 November 1873 – 8 May 1875
- Monarch: Queen Victoria
- Colonial Secretary: James W. W. Birch; Thomas Braddell
- Preceded by: Sir Harry Ord
- Succeeded by: Sir William Jervois

Victorian Legislative Assembly (Member for South Melbourne)
- In office November 1856 – August 1858
- Preceded by: New district
- Succeeded by: Robert Anderson

Victorian Legislative Council (Nominated member)
- In office 29 August 1853 – March 1856
- Preceded by: New seat
- Succeeded by: Original Council abolished

Surveyor General of Victoria
- In office May 1853 – March 1857
- Preceded by: Robert Hoddle
- Succeeded by: George Horne

Lieutenant-General Sir Andrew Clarke GCMG CB CIE (27 July 1824 – 29 March 1902) was a British soldier and governor, as well as a surveyor and politician in Australia.

== Background and education ==
Born in Southsea, Hampshire, Clarke was the eldest of the four sons of Lieutenant-Colonel Andrew Clarke, the governor of Western Australia (1793–1847). Clarke's early years were spent in India with his parents. He was later brought up by his paternal grandfather and two uncles, one of whom was the father of Marcus Clarke, at the family home of Belmont, near Lifford, Ireland. He was educated at The King's School, Canterbury, and at Portora Royal School at Enniskillen, Ireland. At 16 he entered the Royal Military Academy, Woolwich, where one of his teachers was Michael Faraday.

== Career ==
Graduating in 1844, Clarke was commissioned a 2nd Lieutenant in the Royal Engineers and after a year of further study at Chatham was sent to Fermoy in Ireland. In 1846 he was nominated to the Oregon Boundary Commission; his father, who was then governor of Western Australia, urged him instead to come to Australia with the hope of later gaining a professional post with him. As a lieutenant in command of a detachment of Royal Engineers, Clarke sailed with the new lieutenant-governor, Sir William Denison, aboard the Windermere and arrived at Hobart on 26 January 1847. His father's death the following next month left Clarke with little reason to remain in Australia but he continued to superintend convict labour and to survey the area around Hobart and design wharf accommodation and became friends with William Denison.

Clarke's next tour of duty was in New Zealand with governor Sir George Grey, arriving in Auckland on the barque Fanny Fisher on 15 September 1848. He and his detachment worked mainly on road building, and Clarke discovered his gift for dealing with native peoples when he was sent on a peace-making mission to the Bay of Islands.

In 1849 Clarke returned to Hobart to become private secretary to William Denison, Governor of Tasmania and New South Wales, and was also an official nominee in the Tasmanian Legislative Council in 1851–53 and controller of the mounted police.

In March 1853 Clarke was asked to replace Robert Hoddle as Surveyor General of Victoria and arrived at Melbourne in May. His hard work and energy resulted in more land being sold in the next 18 months than in the years since 1836. He also established the Roads Boards that preceded the introduction of local government and was responsible for much of the planning of Victoria's first railways. His proposals for a government-controlled railway system were examined by a select committee and were made law in 1857. Additionally, he set up the first electric telegraph from Melbourne to Williamstown, Victoria and was able to report in November 1857 that the service had reached the borders of New South Wales and South Australia. In 1855 he was elected the inaugural president of the Philosophical Institute of Victoria.

Clarke entered the Victorian Legislative Council in August 1853 as an official representative, where he was active in the drafting of the new constitution. He was also responsible for the drafting and successful inauguration of the Municipal Institutions Act in December 1854, which provided for local government based on the English model in Melbourne's growing suburbs, on the goldfields, and in the country.

At the 1856 elections, Clarke mounted a successful campaign against David Blair for the South Melbourne seat in the Victorian Legislative Assembly, which he held until he left the colony. He joined the first cabinet under William Haines, as Surveyor-General and Commissioner for Lands.

In March 1858 Clarke was appointed permanent head of the Lands and Surveys Department and decided to return to England. In London, he tried and failed to secure the governorship of Queensland and spent some months on barrack duty at Colchester.

From 1859 to 1864 Clarke served in the African colony of the Gold Coast and in England, where he was Director of Works at the Admiralty from 1864 to 1873. During this period he co-authored a report on the Suez Canal with George Henry Richards, Hydrographer to the Admiralty.

=== Governor of the Straits Settlements ===
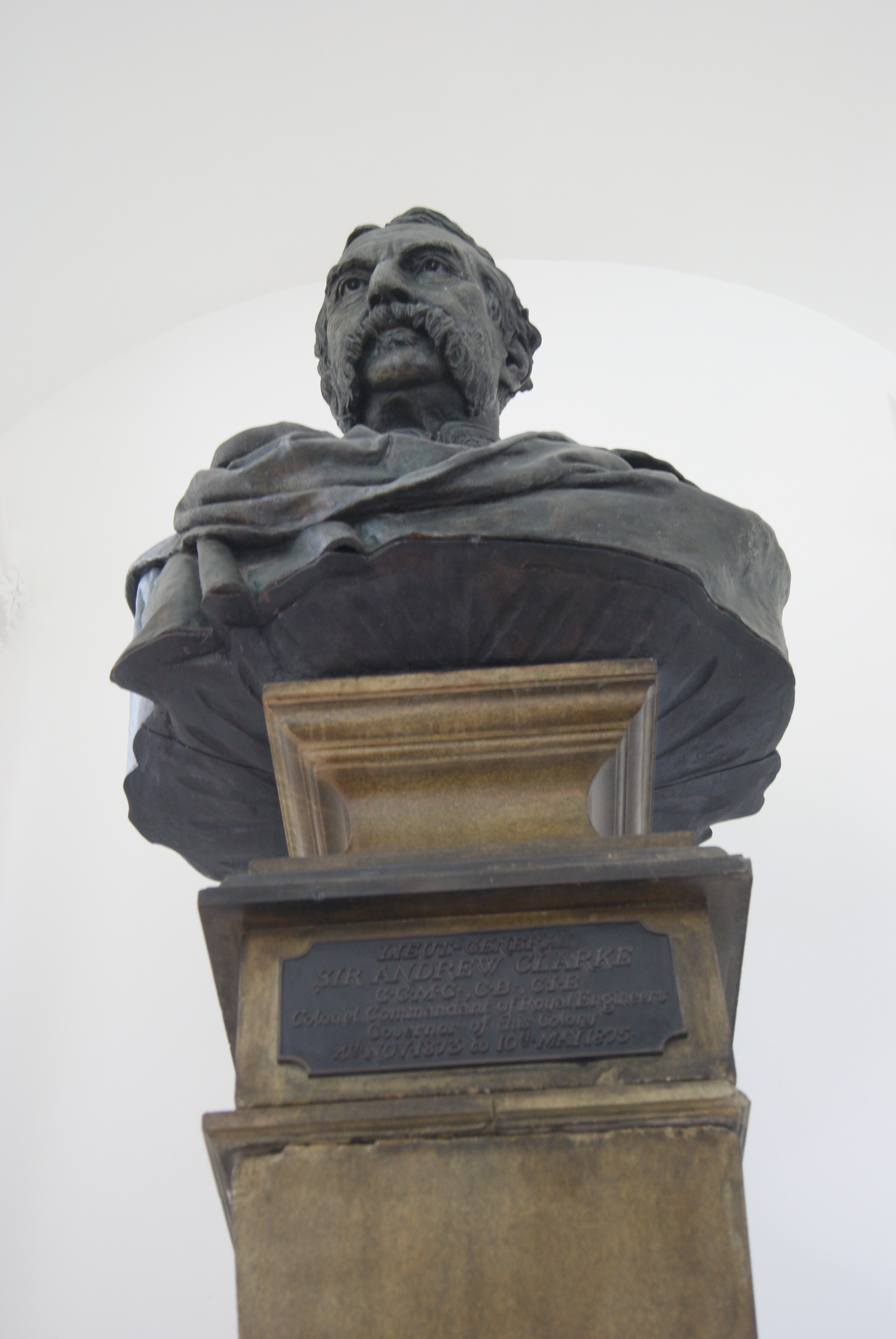
A bust of Clarke in Victoria Concert Hall, Singapore

Sir Andrew Clarke served as the governor of Singapore and the governor of the Straits Settlements from 4 November 1873 until 8 May 1875. Clarke played a key role in positioning Singapore as the main port for the Malay states of Perak, Selangor and Sungei Ujong.

Due to his contributions, Singapore's Clarke Quay was named after him. Clarke Street, located next to Clarke Quay, was officially named in 1896 and was originally two streets known simply as East Street and West Street in north Kampong Malacca. Today it is a pedestrian mall and a popular nightspot.

==== Pangkor Treaty ====
As Governor of the Straits Settlements, Clarke was famous for signing the Treaty of Pangkor in 1874, which established a British protectorate over the Malay States. In that same year, Clarke successfully enforced a check on the abuse of coolies with support of the prominent Chinese leaders and European merchants. Clarke achieved fame through his negotiations in regard to Sungei Ujong in Malaya, sorting out the differences between different leaders in Negeri Sembilan.

Clarke was blamed for the death of the first British resident in Perak, James Wheeler Woodford Birch, due to his ignorance of a complaint, when Sultan Abdullah of Perak wrote a letter to inform him about Birch's rudeness against the Malay rulers, because at that time he was about to retire and did not want that problem to destroy his reputation as one of the most successful colonial administrators.

==== Klang War ====
Clarke was instrumental in determining the outcome of the Klang War which took place from 1867 to 1874 as well as placing Selangor under British protection.

The Straits Settlements were becoming increasingly dependent on the economy of Selangor. Selangor through the 19th and the 20th was one of the world's major tin producers. Since Selangor's security affected tin trade, the British felt it needed to have a say in Selangor politics. The British saw Tengku Kudin as a ticket to reach out to Selangor's royal court. Therefore, the Straits Settlements led by Clarke implicitly supported Tengku Kudin in the war.

Throughout the war, Tengku Kudin brought in soldiers from Kedah and Pahang along with mercenaries and European officers from the Straits Settlements. The end result was a victory for Tengku Kudin.

While the British through Clarke was on Tengku Kudin's side, the post-war situation had weakened Tengku Kudin's power base due to the Selangor royal family's suspicion of Tengku Kudin and the British. Therefore, Andrew Clarke was forced to freeze the plan to reach out to the royal family through Tengku Kudin.

In November 1873 however, a ship from Penang was attacked by pirates near Kuala Langat, Selangor. After a number of piracy attacks took place in Selangor, Andrew Clarke assigned Frank Swettenham as a live-in advisor to Sultan Abdul Samad in August 1874. Sultan Abdul Samad accepted James Guthrie Davidson, a lawyer from Singapore, as the first British Resident of Selangor in 1875. In October the same year, Sultan Abdul Samad sent a letter to Andrew Clarke requesting for Selangor to be placed under the British protectorate.

=== Further service ===
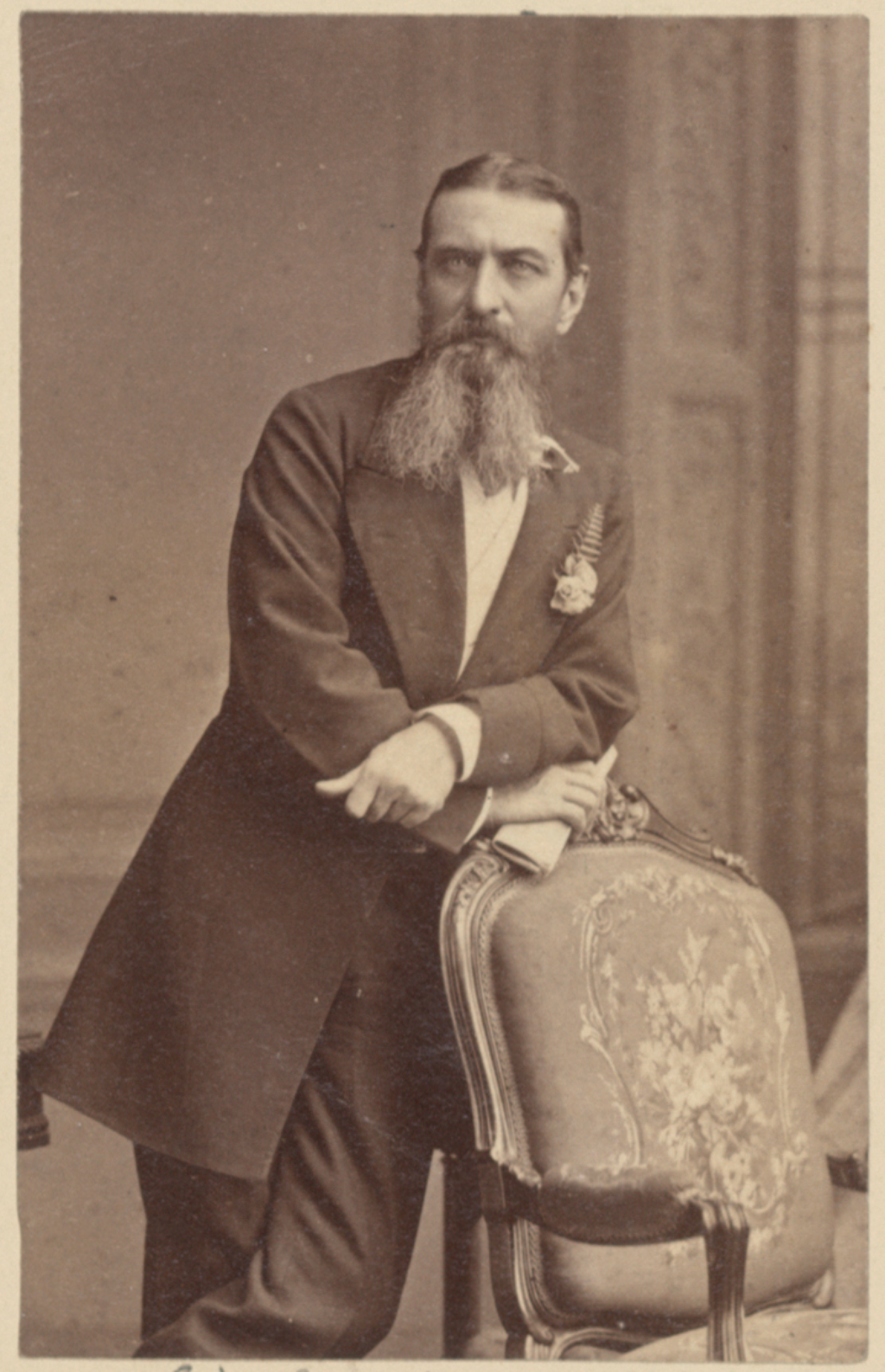
Sir Andrew Clarke during the Second Anglo-Afghan War, circa late 1870s

From 1875 to 1880 Clarke was on the council of the Viceroy of India. He was Commandant of the Royal School of Military Engineering at Chatham from 1881 to 1882, and finally was Inspector-General of Fortifications in England from 1882 to 1886.

After Clarke's retirement from the army, he unsuccessfully contested Chatham for the House of Commons of the United Kingdom in 1886 and 1892 as a follower of William Ewart Gladstone and Home Rule. Clarke retained an interest in the Australian colonies, and briefly acted as Agent-General for Victoria in 1886, 1891, and 1893, before being appointed agent-general in 1899, which post he held until his death.

Clarke also served as a director of Palmers Shipbuilding and Iron Company, the Colonial Life Assurance Society, the Delhi-Umbala Railway Co. and the British North Borneo Company.

In December 1901 he was appointed Colonel Commandant of the Royal Engineers.

== Death ==
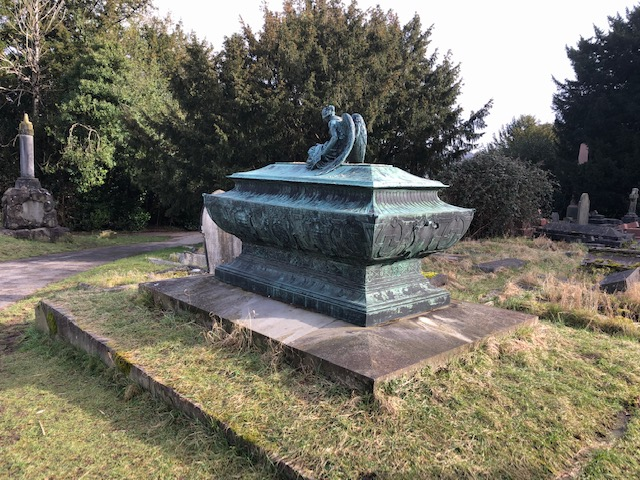
Clarke memorial, Locksbrook Cemetery, Bath

Clarke died at his house in Portland Place, London, on 29 March 1902. He was predeceased by his wife, Mary Margaret MacKillop, whom he had married on 17 September 1867, and he was survived by their only child, Elinor Mary de Winton.

His body was borne to Paddington Station and brought by train to Bath, Somerset, where he was interred with his wife in Locksbrook Cemetery. Their memorial, a bronze sarcophagus with an angel, is the work of Edward Onslow Ford. It is listed Grade II by Historic England.

== Honours ==
- New Zealand War Medal
- India General Service Medal, Perak clasp
- Companion of the Most Honourable Order of the Bath (CB), 1869.
- Knight Commander of the Most Distinguished Order of Saint Michael and Saint George (KCMG), 1873.
- Companion of the Order of the Indian Empire (CIE), 1877.".
- Commissioner, Colonial and Indian Exhibition, 1884
- Knight Grand Cross of the Most Distinguished Order of Saint Michael and Saint George (GCMG), 1885."

== Sources ==
- Vetch, Robert Hamilton (1912). "Clarke, Andrew" . In Lee, Sidney (ed.). Dictionary of National Biography (2nd supplement). London: Smith, Elder & Co.
- Vetch, Robert Hamilton (1905). Life of Lieut-General the Hon. Sir Andrew Clarke. Plymouth: E. P. Dutton and Company.
- Serle, Percival (1949). "Clarke, Andrew". Dictionary of Australian Biography. Sydney: Angus & Robertson.

Other offices
| Preceded by Robert Hoddle | Surveyor General of Victoria; May 1853 – March 1857 | Succeeded by George Horne |
Victorian Legislative Council
| New seat | Nominated member 29 August 1853 – March 1856 | Original Council abolished |
Victorian Legislative Assembly
| New district | Member for South Melbourne; November 1856 – August 1858 | Succeeded by Robert Anderson |
Government offices
| Preceded by Sir Harry Ord | Governor of Straits Settlements; 4 November 1874 – 8 May 1875 | Succeeded by Sir William Jervois |
Military offices
| Preceded by Thomas Gallwey | Inspector-General of Fortifications and Director of Work; 1882–1886 | Succeeded by Lothian Nicholson |
| Preceded by General Charles Fanshawe | Colonel Commandant, Royal Engineers; 1901–1902 | Succeeded by Lieutenant-General Charles B. Ewart |
