= Allah Lanjutkan Usia Sultan =

State anthem of Perak, Malaysia

English: God Lengthen the Sultan's Age
- Coat of arms of Perak
- State anthem of Perak
- Lyrics: Sultan Abdullah Muhammad Shah II of Perak
- Music: Pierre-Jean de Béranger
- Adopted: 1888; 138 years ago

Audio sample
- Band instrumental version: file; help

Choral vocal version
Official anthem of Perak (vocal)

"Allah Lanjutkan Usia Sultan" (pronounced [aɫ'ɫaːh lan.d͡ʒut.kan u.sia sul.tan]; "God Lengthen the Sultan's Age") is the state anthem of Perak, Malaysia.

The tune was originally that of "La Rosalie", a popular song in the Seychelles during the 19th century, originally written by French composer Pierre-Jean de Béranger. It was adopted as Perak's royal anthem by Sultan Abdullah Muhammad Shah II, who was exiled in the Seychelles for abetting murder.

In 1957, the national anthem of Malaysia, "Negaraku" was set to the melody of "Allah Lanjutkan Usia Sultan".

== Lyrics ==
Malay
Jawi
IPA transcription (Note: See Help:IPA/Malay.)
Translation
Allah Lanjutkan Usia Sultan

Dilanjutkan Allah usianya Sultan
Adil dan murah memerintah watan
Ditaati rakyat kiri dan kanan
Iman yang soleh Allah kurniakan
Allah berkati Perak Ridzuan
Allah selamatkan Negeri dan Sultan.

دلنجوتکن ﷲ اوسياڽ سلطان
عاديل دان موره ممرينته وطن
دطاعتي رعيت کيري دان کانن
ايمان يڠ صالح ﷲ کورنياکن
ﷲ برکتي ڤيراق رضوان
ﷲ سلامتکن نݢري دان سلطان.

[di.lan.d͡ʒut.kan ɑɫ'ɫɑːh u.sia.ɲa sul.tan]
[a.dil dan mu.rah mə.mə.rin.tah wa.tan]
[di.ta.ʔa.ti raʔ.jat ki.ri dan ka.nan]
[i.man jaŋ so.leh ɑɫ'ɫɑːh kur.nia.kan]
[ɑɫ'ɫɑːh bər.ka.ti pe.raʔ ri.dzu.an]
[ɑɫ'ɫɑːh sə‿la.mat.kan nə.gə‿ri dan sul.tan]

A long life may God grant to our Sultan
Reigning just and kind o'er the land!
We shall obey his every command
May our faith be true, by Allah's hand
O God almighty, bless Perak abode of grace
God save our state, God save our Sultan!
