= Matang, Perak =

Mukim in Larut, Matang and Selama District, Perak, Malaysia

Matang (Jawi: ماتڠ; Chinese: 峇登) is a mukim in Larut, Matang and Selama District, Perak, Malaysia. It has many small towns and villages and is located near Taiping, Simpang, Kamunting and Kuala Sepetang. Historical fort Kota Ngah Ibrahim is situated there.
