= List of wars involving Malaysia =

This is a list of wars involving Malaysia.

Malaysia victory
Malaysia defeat
Ongoing

== List ==
Conflict	Combatant 1	Combatant 2	Result
Federation of Malaya (1957–1966)
Malayan Emergency (1948–1960)	British Commonwealth forces: United Kingdom: Federation of Malaya; Singapore; Malacca (until 1957); Penang (until 1957); Kenya; Southern Rhodesia (until 1953); Rhodesia and Nyasaland (from 1953); Fiji; Australia; New Zealand; Supported by: Thailand (Thai–Malaysian border)	Communist forces: Malayan Communist Party; Malayan National Liberation Army	Commonwealth victory: Independence of Malaya from the United Kingdom on 31 August 1957; Malaya became an independent member of the British Commonwealth; CPM retreats to the Malayan-Thai border; Insurgency continues (1968–1989); Conflict resolved through the Peace Agreement of Hat Yai (1989)
Congo Crisis (1960–1964)	1960–1963: (Democratic Republic of the Congo) Republic of the Congo; Supported by: Soviet Union (1960); (United Nations) ONUC (Note: ONUC, the United Nations Operation in the Congo, included troops from Ghana, Tunisia, Morocco, Ethiopia, Ireland, Guinea, Sweden, Mali, Sudan, Liberia, Canada, India, Indonesia and the United Arab Republic among others.) Malaysia; 1963–1964: Democratic Republic of the Congo; United States; Belgium; Supported by: (United Nations) ONUC (1964); Malaysia	1960–1963: Katanga; South Kasai; Supported by: Belgium (Note: The secession of Katanga and South Kasai was also supported by South Africa, France, Portuguese Angola and the neighbouring Central African Federation. However, neither was ever officially recognised by any state.); 1960–1962: (Democratic Republic of the Congo) Free Republic of the Congo; Supported by: Soviet Union; 1963–1964: Kwilu and Simba rebels; Supported by: Soviet Union; China; Cuba	Victory: The Congo established as an independent unitary state under the authoritarian presidency of Mobutu Sese Seko.
Cross border attacks in North Borneo (1962–present)	Malaysia: Sabah; Philippines (1986–2016); Indonesia; Vietnam; Singapore; Thailand Supported by: Australia (1963–66) (troops and material aid); New Zealand (1963–66) (troops and material aid); United Kingdom (until 1966) (troops and material aid); Brunei (material aid); Bangsamoro militia support: Moro Islamic Liberation Front; Moro National Liberation Front (Mus Sema faction)	Abu Sayyaf (1991–2024) Philippines (until 1986, 2016–present); Moro Pirates (1963–present); Sulu Sultanate (Jamalul Kiram III faction) (2013–present) Former Sabah invasion supporter: Moro National Liberation Front (Misuari faction) (2001–2015): Bangsamoro Republik (2013)	Security in mainland Sabah was under control, cross border attacks ongoing; Operation Merdeka to invade Sabah under the instruction of Ferdinand Marcos failed to carry out and the starting of insurgency in the Southern Philippines after Marcos soldiers execute a number of Moro fighters in an event known as Jabidah massacre.; Nur Misuari deported to the Philippines in 2001 under the ASEAN friendship after Malaysian security forces found he had stayed illegally on an island in Sabah to escape from the Philippine authorities after a failed rebellion against the Philippine Government.; Establishment of RCI in 2012 when Sabah was infiltrated with huge numbers of illegal immigrants from the Philippines who escape from the war torn Mindanao and the Sulu Archipelago.; Deportation of thousands of Filipino illegal immigrants in Sabah after they were found collaborating with militants during a brief of standoff with a self-proclaimed Filipino Sultan Jamalul Kiram III followers in 2013.; Establishment of ESSCOM and ESSZONE in 2013 to counter further Filipino militant infiltrations and to prevent the mass exodus of Filipino illegal immigrants into Sabah.; Sabah ceases its cross-border trade and barter trade in eastern waters from 7 April 2016 – 1 February 2017 due to persistent Abu Sayyaf attacks.; The governments of Malaysia, Philippines and Indonesia have signed an agreement to jointly countering the persistent lawlessness in the Sulu Archipelago.
Sarawak Communist Insurgency (1962–1990)	Anti-communist forces: United Kingdom: Sarawak (until 1963); Malaysia: Sarawak (after 1963); Supported by: Australia; Brunei; New Zealand; United States Indonesia (after 1965) (Indo-Malay border)	Communist forces: North Kalimantan Communist Party: Sarawak People's Guerrilla Force (SPGF); North Kalimantan People's Army (NKPA); Indonesia (1962–65) (military aid); Other support: Brunei People's Party: North Kalimantan National Army (NKNA); Malayan Communist Party: Malayan National Liberation Army (MNLA); Supported by: China; North Vietnam (until 1975); North Korea	Victory: Peace Declaration of Sri Aman in 1973; Dissolution of the Sarawak Communist Organisation/North Kalimantan Communist Party (SCO/NKCP).
Indonesia–Malaysia confrontation (1963–1966)	The Commonwealth of Nations; United Kingdom; Malaysia (Note: Before Federation, the three separate entities Malaya, Sarawak, and North Borneo participated independently); Singapore (Note: Until 1965); Brunei; Australia; New Zealand	Indonesia; Aligned parties: PKI; NKCP; PGRS; PRB	Commonwealth victory: Indonesia accepts formation of Malaysia; Sukarno was replaced by Suharto following G30S coup attempt; Communist insurgency in Sarawak continues until 1989
Malaysia (16 September 1963 – present)
Second Malayan Emergency (1968–1989)	Anti-communist forces: Malaysia; Singapore; Thailand; Supported by: United Kingdom; New Zealand; Indonesia (from 1965)	Communist forces: Malayan Communist Party: Malayan National Liberation Army; Communist Party of Malaya/Revolutionary Faction (1970–1983); Communist Party of Malaya/Marxist–Leninist (1974–1983); Malaysian Communist Party (1983–1987); North Kalimantan Communist Party; Communist Party of Thailand (until 1983); Supported by: China (until 1976) Soviet Union; Indonesia (1962–1965)	Malaysian government victory: Peace agreement reached; Communists agree to a ceasefire; Peace Agreement of Hat Yai signed between the communists and the governments of Malaysia and Thailand; Dissolution of the Malayan Communist Party (MCP); Insurgency continues in Sarawak until 1990
Operation Gothic Serpent (1993)	United States; Malaysia; Pakistan	Somali National Alliance	Somali National Alliance victory: TF Ranger withdrawal on 20 October 1993; Captured SNA personnel released by January 1994; US forces withdrawal on 3 March 1994; UNOSOM II withdrawal on 28 March 1995
UNPROFOR (1992–1995)	Argentina; Australia; Bangladesh; Belgium; Brazil; Canada; Colombia; Czech Republic; Denmark; Egypt; Estonia; Finland; France; Germany; Ghana; India; Indonesia; Ireland; Italy; Jordan; Kenya; Lithuania; Luxembourg; Malaysia; Nepal; Netherlands; New Zealand; Nigeria; Norway; Pakistan; Poland; Portugal; Russia; Slovakia; Spain; Sweden; Switzerland; Tunisia; Turkey; Ukraine; United Kingdom; United States; United Nations; NATO	Yugoslavia; Bosnia: Republika Srpska; Croatia: Republic of Serbian Krajina	Victory: Peace Agreement.; Croatia declares independence.; Bosnia and Herzegovina declares independence.; Dissolution of Yugoslavia, Republika Srpska and Republic of Serbian Krajina.
International Force for East Timor (1999–2000)	International Force: Australia – 5,500; New Zealand – 1,200; Thailand – 1,600; Bangladesh; Brazil; Canada; Denmark; Egypt; Fiji; France; Germany; Ireland; Italy; Jordan; Kenya; Malaysia; Norway; Philippines; Portugal; Singapore; South Korea; United Kingdom; United States	(Indonesia) Militia: (Indonesia) Pro-Indonesian Militias; Aitarak; Besi Merah Putih; Laksaur; Mahidi	Victory: Defeat of pro-Indonesian militia; Stabilisation of East Timor; Succeeded by United Nations peacekeeping mission UNTAET
Operation Astute (2006–2013)	Australia; New Zealand; Malaysia; Portugal; East Timor (government troops); United Nations soldiers	Renegade elements of the FDTL	Victory: Stabilisation of East Timor
Operation Ocean Shield (2009–2016)	NATO: Denmark; United Kingdom; United States; France; Netherlands; Spain; Greece; Romania; Germany; Belgium; Canada; Italy; Portugal; Turkey; Norway; Non-NATO: Australia; China; Colombia; India; Indonesia; Japan; Malaysia; New Zealand; Oman; Pakistan; Peru; Philippines; Russia; Saudi Arabia; Seychelles; Singapore; South Africa; South Korea; Taiwan; Thailand; Ukraine; Yemen	Somali pirates	Allied victory
Lahad Datu standoff (2013)	Malaysia; Sabahan local villagers Supported by: Philippines (Note: Supported Malaysian action during the standoff, but was not involved in the operation.)	(Sulu Sultanate) Sultanate of Sulu (Jamalul Kiram III's faction); Filipino illegal immigrants (non-combative); Supported by: Moro National Liberation Front (Misuari faction)	Decisive Malaysian victory: Military operations replaced by ESSCOM and ESSZONE.; Those detained were charged under the Security Offences (Special Measures) Act 2012.; Thousands of illegal immigrants in Sabah repatriated.
