= Taiping Hospital =

Hospital in Larut, Matang and Selama, Perak, Malaysia

Coordinates: 4°51′04″N 100°44′13″E

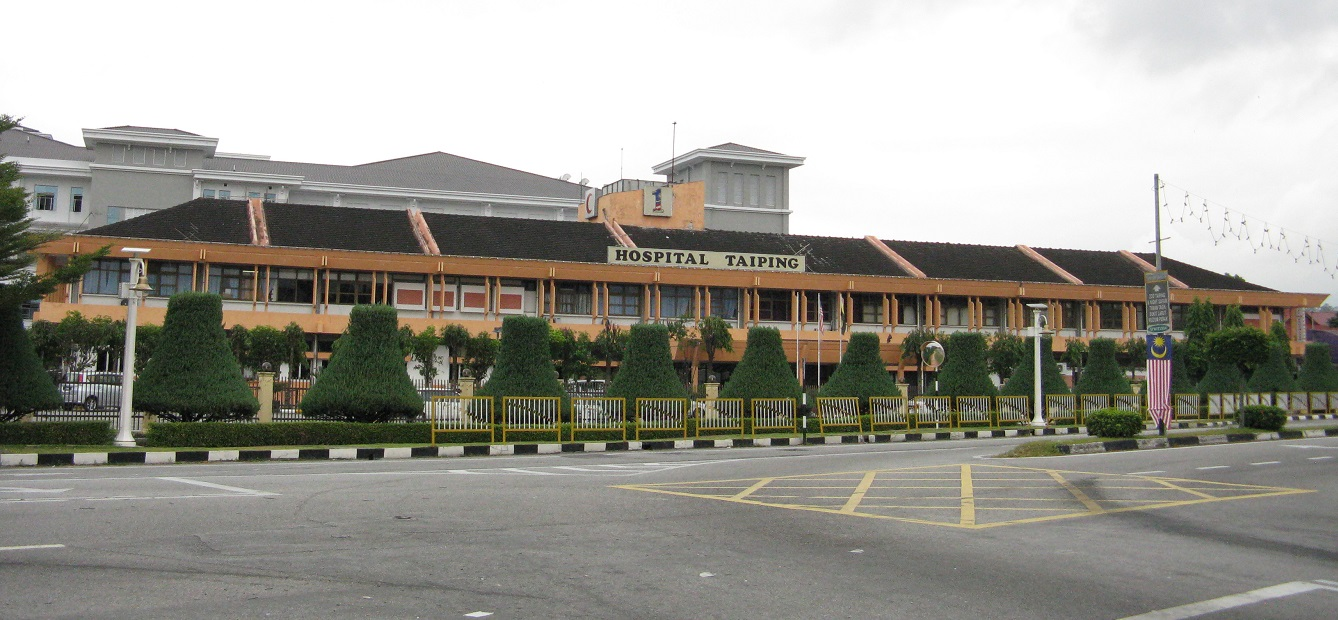

Geography
- Location: Jalan Taming Sari, 34000 Taiping, Larut & Matang, Perak, Malaysia

Organisation
- Type: Specialist

Services
- Standards: National standards
- Emergency department: Yes
- Beds: 642
- Speciality: Emergency

History
- Opened: 1880; 146 years ago

Links
- Website: jknperak.moh.gov.my/htaiping/v2/

Taiping Hospital, formerly known as Yong Wah Hospital, is a district general hospital was one of the first hospitals established in Malaysia. Located at Jalan Taming Sari (Main Road) near the commercial town centre, it is one of the biggest hospitals in Malaysia and is the second biggest in the State of Perak. The hospital is strategically situated 80 km from Ipoh and 85 km from Penang and was able to serve the northern states of Malaysia.

== History ==
Yong Wah Hospital or the Chinese Pauper Hospital was the first established hospital in the Federated Malay States. Established in 1880 to treat the Chinese 'coolies' and tin-miners who were often sick and suffered from various diseases, such as diarrhoea, cholera, malaria, beriberi, dysentery, and pulmonary diseases. Its establishment was developed in parallel with the significant economy growth in the town.

The hospital gained financial support from the Chinese merchants, while the State Government aided provision of medical apparatus, medicines and nursing staff. With consideration to the poor people's welfare, the hospital only charged a minimum fee of 50 cents per annum from the poor 'coolies'. The hospital's policies worked out efficiently for the first six months of its establishment, but it later incurred difficulties collecting the fees. The reason was most 'coolies' were unable to settle their medical fees due to their low income.

Therefore, by the end of the year 1880, the State Government took over full responsibility for the Yong Wah Hospital, and it was shifted to its current location at Main Road, and renamed Taiping General Hospital. The maintenance costs of the hospital were so high, that Sir Hugh Low, the then British Resident of Perak levied an annual capitation fee of one dollar, on everyone who lived in the Taiping district, and a health coupon was produced for those who could pay the fees. The fees were used as a contribution to the expense of maintaining the hospital, with no profit gained from the collections. All food, medicine and attendance was given free-of-charge. The Chinese community, however, strongly objected to this tax, because it was never levied in other Malay states, and the system was later abolished in 1884.

The institution consists of many wards and other buildings arranged in carefully laid out grounds, planted with palms, beautiful trees and flowering shrubs, which are very restful to the eye. The aim of the hospital was to curb diseases from spreading among the 'coolies', reduce the rate of death, and increase the rate of population growth. The results were positive. The number of deaths and diseases declined gradually in the district, and the rate of birth increased tremendously, and Taiping's economic growth continued to prosper.

The institution was initially run under the supervision of Dr. Hamilton Wright, the first Health Inspector. The hospital was able to sustain 900 patients at a time, according to Sir Cecil Clementi's report during his state visit. In 1881, the hospital underwent a major renovation. The overall renovation cost was estimated to have been about 2,100 Straits dollars. By the year 1884, an additional ward and a dispensary were added; the hospital's drainage system was also improved with the total cost of 9,379 Straits dollars.

The same year, there was a total about 13,000 hospital cases in Perak. In Taiping out of a total of 3,068 cases handled by the hospital, 2,501 cases were because of beriberi. The main cause of the beriberi was malnutrition. Other diseases were caused by improper sanitation. Taiping also housed a lunatic asylum (within the hospital compound) and a prison hospital (in the prison) under the supervision of Mr Thomas Prendergast. In 1906, the Government medical staff extended the services for outpatients particularly in the rural areas. The percentage of deaths to cases treated was 18.08% in Taiping, compared to other 13 hospitals in Perak.

The number of patients treated in the course of a year ran to many thousands, and the sums expended by the Government on the Medical Department, with all its surgeons and assistants, nurses, dispensers, dressers, attendants, cooks, gardeners, gate-keepers, etc., amounted to a very large total. It was reported that many of the government's funds flowed to the hospital.

Therefore, by the year 1890, a Sanitary Board was established to control and monitor the health and cleanliness of the town. On 3 February 1896, the hospital installed its first X-Ray equipment, and indeed was the first hospital in Malaya and also Far East Asia to have those facilities. Mr. Leonard Wray chaired the opening ceremony, and the first 'patient' who was X-Rayed was a pomfret fish.

In 1906, the Medical Department reported that 318,000 Straits dollars were to be granted to Perak for development in every sector. Good health care was thus facilitated by the Government. By a year later, the population in Taiping, as well as elsewhere in Perak, had increased as a result. Taiping's pioneering example of a successful health institution was later adopted by other towns in Malaya, and now almost every town in Malaya has a hospital.

The Straits Times newspaper on 16 February 1897, quote:

Shadow photography in Perak: At a meeting of the Perak Amateur Photographic Society at Taiping, on the 3rd instant, the chairman, Mr Wray, produced a Roentgen ray apparatus. Perak is said to be the first country in the Far East, where the new photography has gained a footing. The apparatus used was a induction coil, the tube being one of Professor Jackson's. Mr Wray began operating on fish (ikan bawal) with success, the image development exhibition most faithfully the bones constituting the fish. Then the rays were turned upon the fractured hand of one of the audience, Mr Pourlier, who had met with an accident at cricket sixteen months ago. The resulting picture fully answered the expectations. It is understood that the hospital in Perak will shortly be provided with Roentgen apparatus.

== Chronology ==
- 1880 – The first hospital known as Yong Wah Hospital in the Federated Malay States was established in April 1880 at Taiping, Perak. In December of the same year it was taken over by the State Government and named as Taiping General Hospital and shifted to Main Road.
- 1881 – The hospital went a major renovation and suspension.
- 1884 – Sir Hugh Low levied a capitation fee of one dollar for the hospital services. The system was later abolished in the same year.
- 1890 – Sanitary Board was established to control and monitor the health and cleanliness of the town.
- 1897 – On 3 February, the first Roentgen ray apparatus was installed at Taiping. The Straits Times reported that this was probably the first country in the Far East to use Roentgen rays. On 14 February, the first demonstration of X-rays was conducted at the hospital.
- 1906 – The medical staff extended the services for outpatients particularly the rural areas in Perak.
- 1917 – On 12 June, the Taiping planters' complaint of lack of X-ray facilities in the locality.
- 2007 – In the year 2007, the hospital was separated into two major units. The outpatients unit was shifted to a new building at Tupai Road. While, the old building serves as emergency unit and retain at its former location.

== Specialties and services ==
1. Anesthesiology
2. Audiology
3. Dermatology
4. Emergency
5. Internal Medicine
6. Obstetrics and Gynecology
7. Ophthalmology
8. Orthopedic
9. Otorhinolaryngology
10. Pathology
11. Pediatric
12. Pharmacy
13. Physiotherapy
14. Psychiatry
15. Oral Surgery
16. Sports and Exercise Medicine
17. Paediatric Dentistry
