= Simpang, Perak =

Suburb of Taiping, Perak, Malaysia

Coordinates: 4°49′N 100°42′E

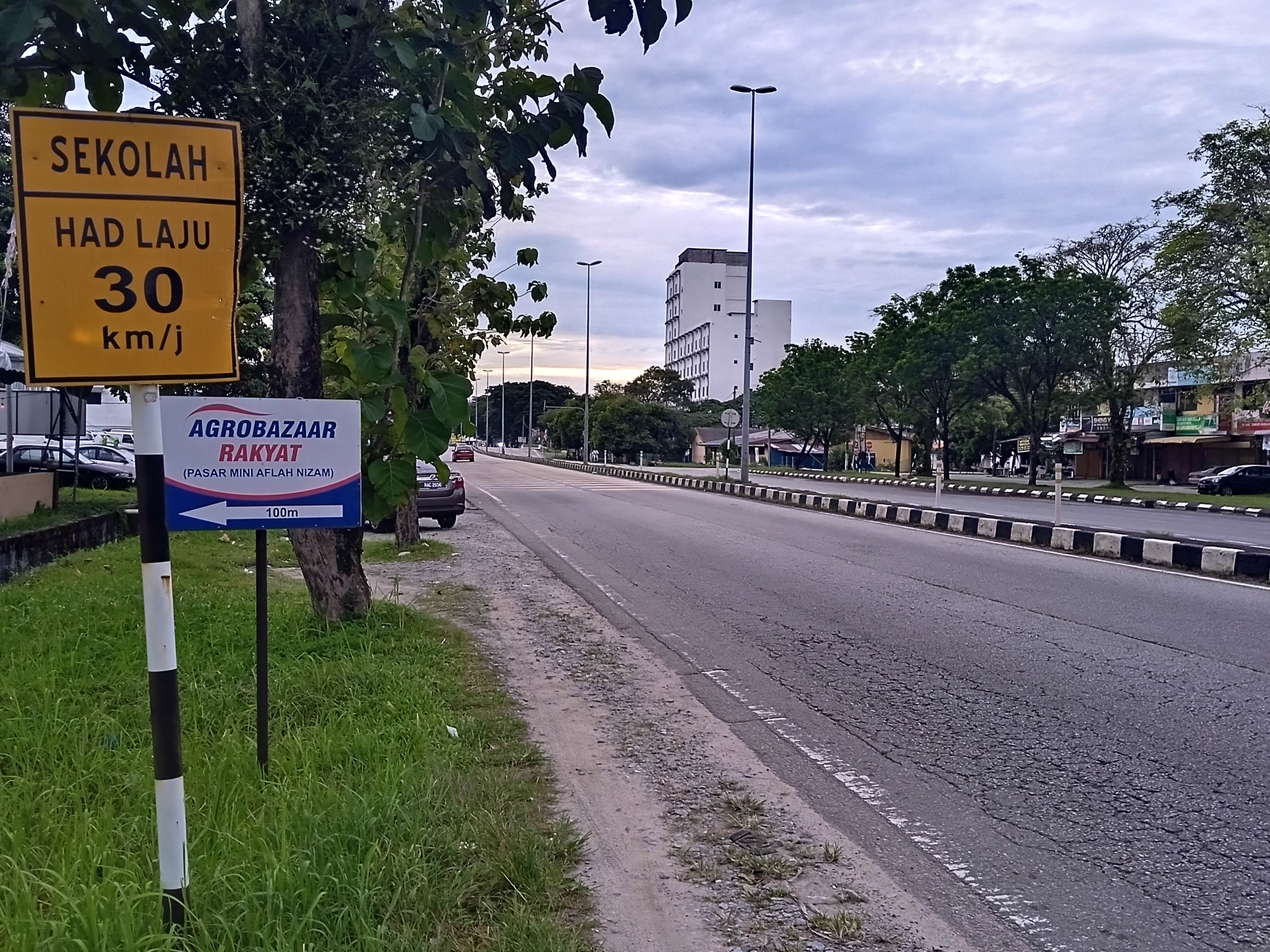
Simpang

Simpang (Jawi: سيمڤڠ) is a suburb of Taiping, Perak, Malaysia.

== Infrastructure ==
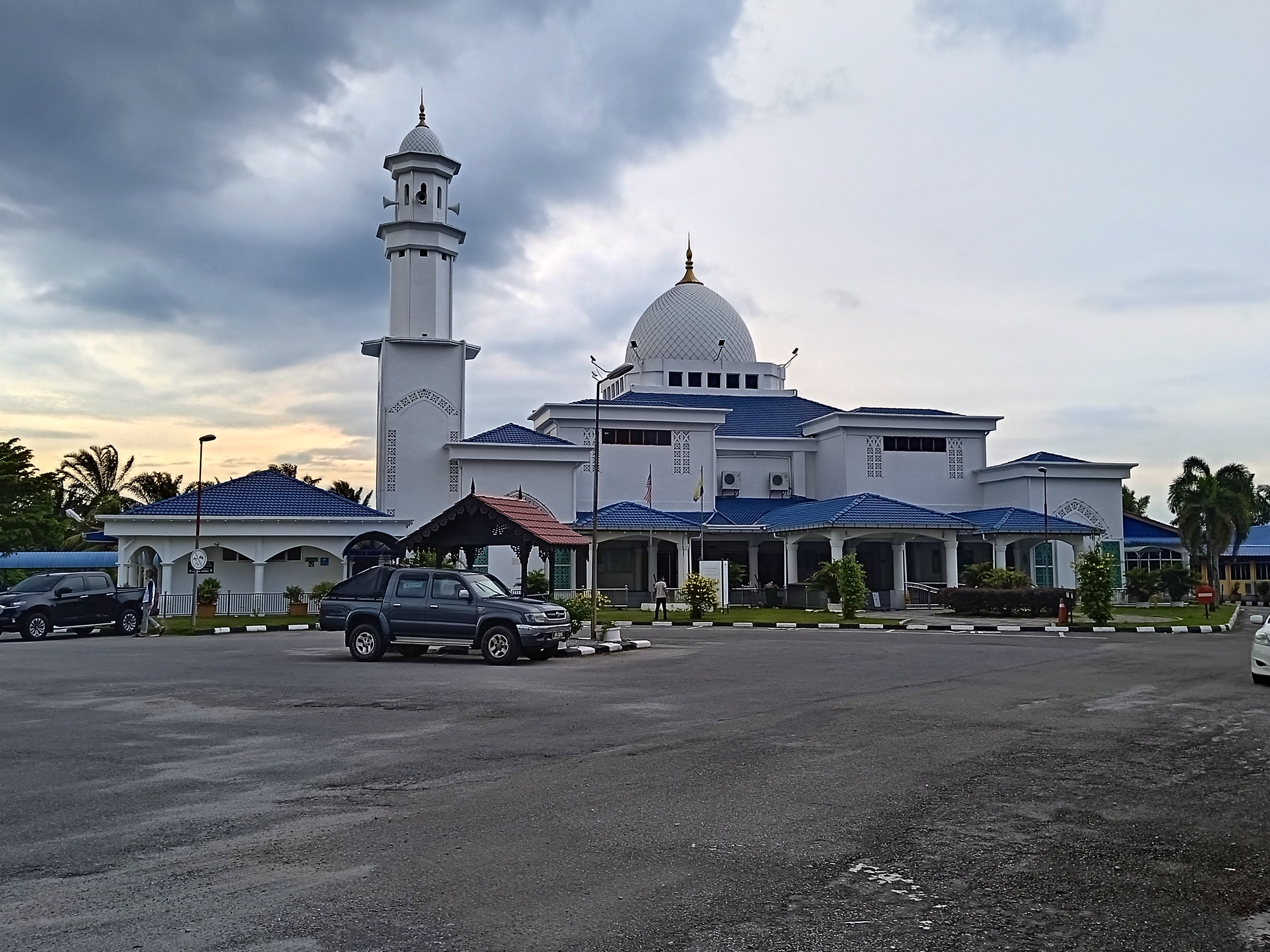
Masjid Al-Ikhwaniah (2024)

- Masjid Al-Ikhwaniah
