= James W. W. Birch =

Colonial Administrator

James Wheeler Woodford Birch
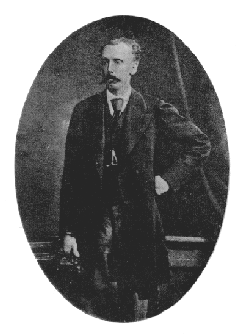

1st British Resident of Perak
- In office 4 November 1874 – 2 November 1875
- Preceded by: Position established
- Succeeded by: Frank A. Swettenham

2nd Colonial Secretary of Straits Settlements
- In office 6 June 1870 – 4 November 1874
- Monarch: Queen Victoria
- Governor: Harry St. George Ord; Edward Anson; Harry St. George Ord; Edward Anson; Andrew Clarke
- Preceded by: Ronald MacPherson
- Succeeded by: Thomas Braddell (acting)

Personal details
- Born: 3 April 1826
- Died: 2 November 1875 (aged 49) Pasir Salak, Perak, British Malaya
- Cause of death: Assassination

James Wheeler Woodford Birch, commonly known as J. W. W. Birch (3 April 1826 – 2 November 1875) was a British colonial official who was assassinated in the Malay state of Perak in 1875, an event that led to the outbreak of the Perak War and ultimately to the extension of British political influence over the Malay Peninsula.

== Background ==
Born in 1826, Birch served for a short period in the Royal Navy before joining the Roads Department in Ceylon in 1846. His career in Ceylon was successful, and on 6 June 1870 he was transferred to Singapore to take up the position of Colonial Secretary of the Straits Settlements.

Following the Pangkor Engagement, under which Raja Abdullah had agreed to accept a British political agent to be known as a "Resident" at his court, Birch was appointed to the post on 4 November 1874 as the government custodian to the Sultan of Perak.

== Assassination ==
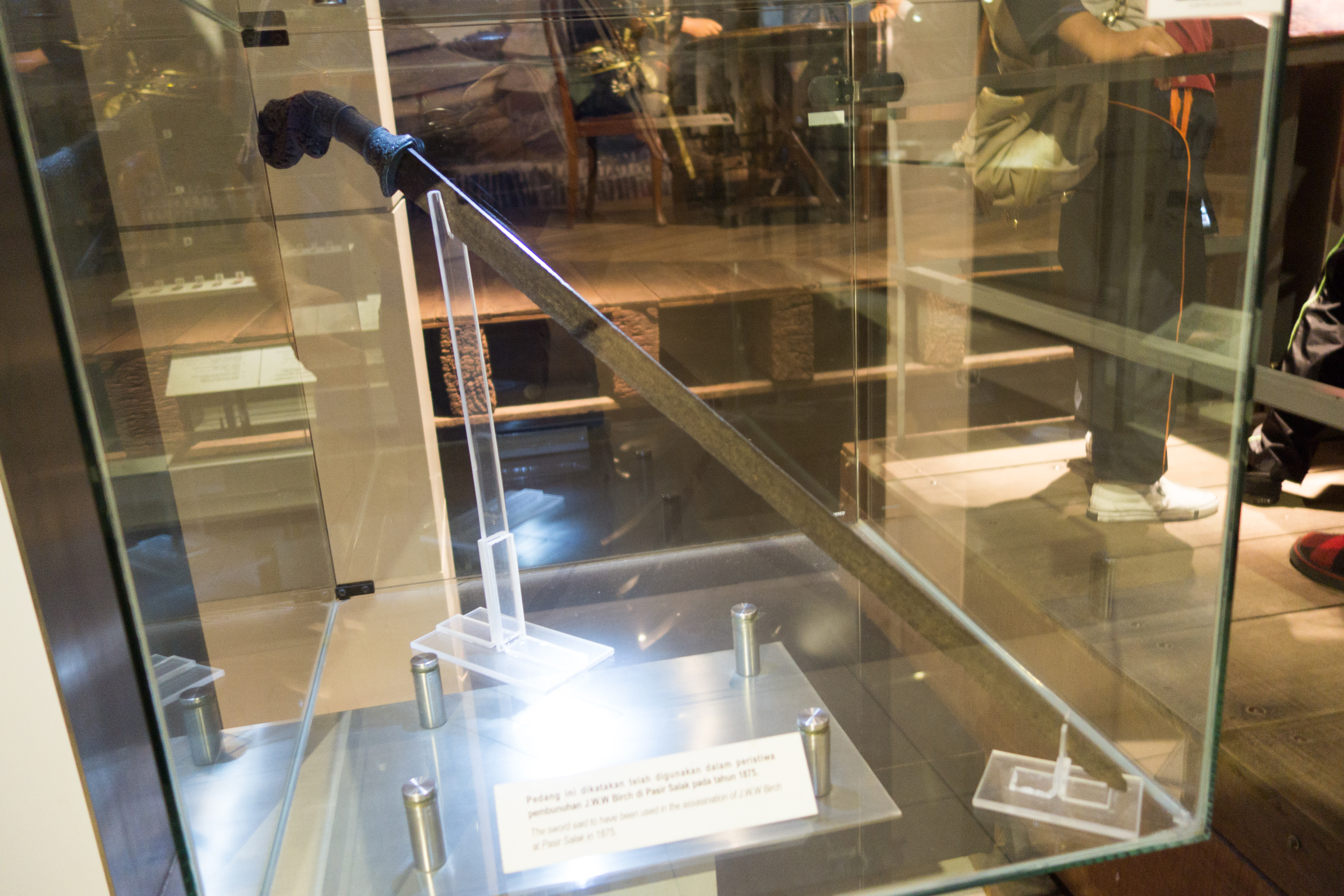
The sword said to have been used in the assassination of J.W.W. Birch, displayed at Muzium Negara.

Birch was opposed to the institution of slavery in Malaysia during his stay there, a stance that ultimately resulted in his assassination. A Malay deputation pleaded with Governor-General Andrew Clarke in Singapore "to prevent the Resident from interfering with religion and custom, from acting without consulting Sultan and chiefs, and from depriving them of their property, namely fugitive slaves and feudal dues." Clarke had already expressed his displeasure with Birch, noting on 25 March 1875, "I am very much annoyed with Birch and the heads-over-heels way in which he does things; he and I will come to sorrow yet, if he does not mind." As the situation in Perak deterioriated, Raja Abdullah called a meeting of chiefs on 21 July 1875 at which the idea of poisoning Birch was first discusssed and then the offer by Maharaja Lela, a local Malay chief, to stab Birch to death was accepted.

Birch was killed on 2 November 1875 by followers of Maharaja Lela, including Sepuntum, who speared him to death while he was in the bath-house of his boat, the SS Dragon, which was moored on the bank of the Perak River below the Maharaja Lela's house, in Pasir Salak, near today's Teluk Intan (Teluk Anson).

Although experienced in colonial government affairs, Birch was never comfortable speaking Malay. He also aroused the hostility of several Perakian chiefs due to the new taxation collection system and by enforcing his authority via methods causing public humiliation such as burning homes and ordering the surrender of arms and slaves.

Sultan Abdullah, who was also believed to have had some complicity in the assassination, was deposed and exiled to Seychelles. His rival Raja Yusuf was installed as the 27th sultan of Perak on 7 October 1886.

In the aftermath of the event, the administration shifted to Taiping. A new Resident, Sir Hugh Low, was appointed and went about his administration of Perak in a more diplomatic way. Whilst still banning outright slavery, he gradually phased out debt-slavery and assuaged the feelings of the ruler and chieftains by allowing for adequate monthly compensation to them.

=== Historical interpretations of Birch's assassination ===
Malaysian historian Cheah Boon Kheng argues that while "in present-day Malaysian school history textbooks," Birch's assassination "is presented as an anti-colonial uprising, in which almost all the Perak Malays participated", in fact the political situation in Perak was more complex, with deep divisions between supporters of the two rival claimants to the throne of Perak, Raja Abdullah and Raja Ismail. Cheah argues that Maharaja Lela's actions in contributing to Birch's death must be understood in the context of Malay feudal rivalries and not as an early example of resistance to imperialism.

== Memorial ==
Birch's grave is located near the site of the British fort at Kampung Memali, about 24 km from Pasir Salak. His grave is now covered by a palm oil estate. The Birch Memorial Clock Tower was built in 1909 and still stands in front of the Ipoh State Mosque. One of the 44 figures on the clock, an image of Muhammad, was painted over in the 1990s due to religious sensitivities. Roads in Kuala Lumpur and Taiping were thought to have been named after him (Birch Road), but this was for a different Birch (namely, his eldest son Ernest Woodford Birch, also a Resident of Perak). The same road was renamed Maharajalela Road (Malay: Jalan Maharajalela) after Malaya's independence in 1957. Similarly, there are Birch Roads in several towns in Malaysia (Seremban, Penang and Ipoh) and in Singapore.

== Drama and film ==
Malaysian dramatist Kee Thuan Chye's 1994 book We Could Kill You, Mr Birch is a dramatic reinterpretation of the events around the Birch assassination.

There have been two attempts by Malaysian directors to make a film based on these events, neither of which have been successful. Jins Shamsuddin had plans to make a film titled The King of the River: Pasir Salak, but passed away in 2017 before he could realize his vision. Syamsul Yusof has been in talks with Jins Shamsuddin's family about reviving the project, but it is unclear what the project's current status is. Malaysian director Mamat Khalid started production of another film titled Pasir Salak Pasir Berdarah (The Sand of Pasir Salak is the Sand of Blood). At the time of his death in 2021, the film was unfinished but the National Film Development Corporation Malaysia announced that it would support the completion of the film. In 2021, Mamat Khalid's son, Mohd Khaled Amen, was offered financial support by FINAS to continue his father's work on the film. However, there are no indications that production of the film has resumed.

== See also ==
- Corresp: Actions of Perak Expeditionary Force post-murder of Birch

Government offices
| Preceded by Ronald MacPherson | Colonial Secretary of Straits Settlements; 1870–1874 | Succeeded by Thomas Braddell (Acting) |
| New title | British Resident of Perak; 1874–1875 | Succeeded by Frank A. Swettenham |
