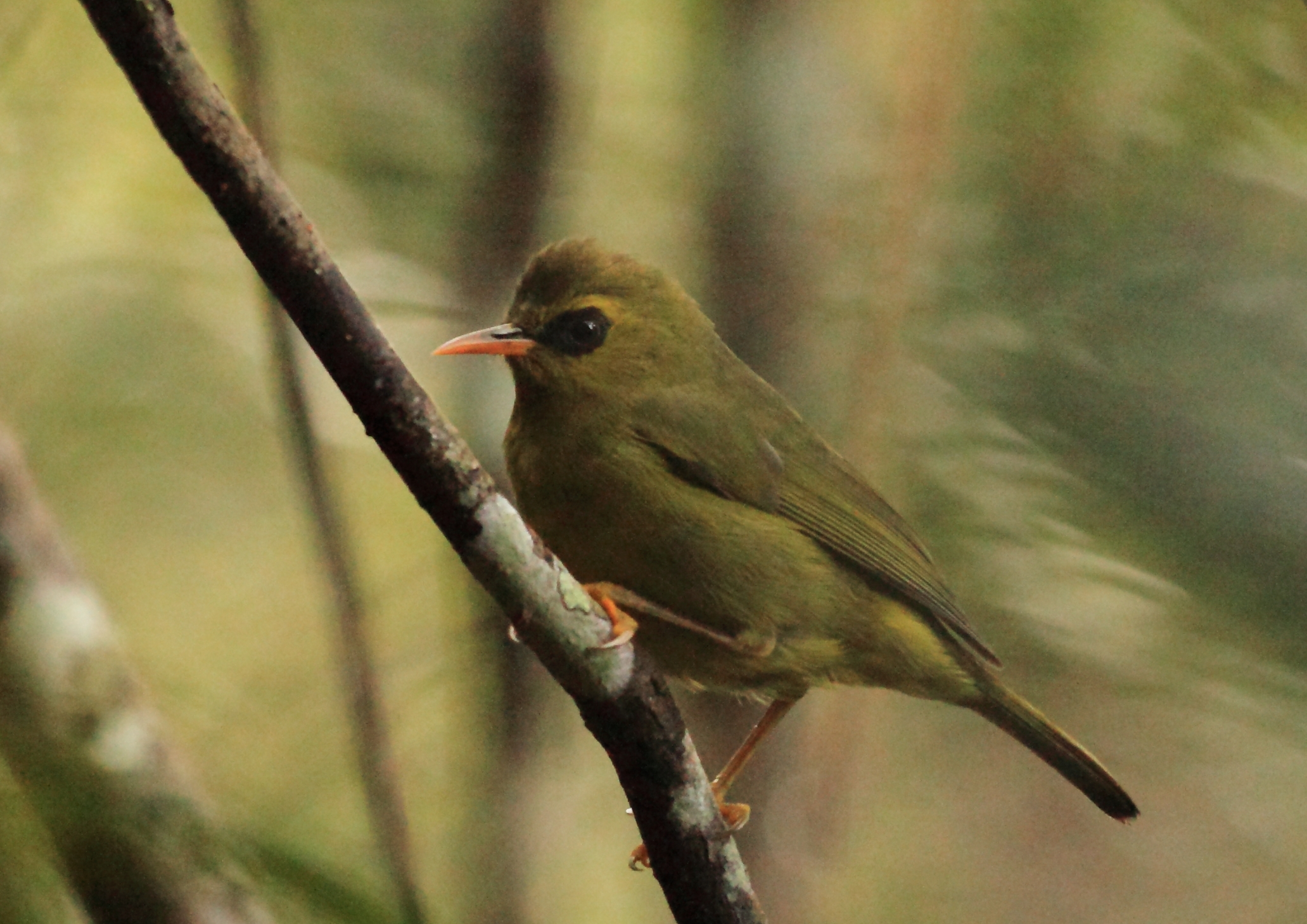

Conservation status
- Least Concern (IUCN 3.1)

Scientific classification
- Kingdom: Animalia
- Phylum: Chordata
- Class: Aves
- Order: Passeriformes
- Family: Zosteropidae
- Genus: Zosterops
- Species: Z. emiliae

Binomial name
- Zosterops emiliae (Sharpe, 1888)

Subspecies
- Z. e. emiliae Sharpe, 1888; Z. e. trinitae Harrison, 1957; Z. e. fusciceps Mees, 1954; Z. e. moultani Chasen and Kloss, 1927

Synonyms
- Chlorocharis emiliae Sharpe, 1888

= Mountain blackeye =

Species of bird endemic to Borneo

The mountain blackeye (Zosterops emiliae), sometimes referred to as the olive blackeye or simply black-eye, is a species of passerine bird in the family Zosteropidae. It is endemic to the highest mountains on the island of Borneo. It is known from both Malaysian states on the island, and four of the five Indonesian provinces, but has never been recorded in Brunei. Typically found at elevations above 1,800 m (5,900 ft), the mountain blackeye sometimes moves to lower altitudes during periods of drought. There are four subspecies, which show clinal variations in size and coloring. Birds in the north are largest, darkest, and proportionately longer-tailed, while those further south are smaller, paler, and proportionately shorter-tailed. Adults are dark olive-green with a sharply-pointed, bright yellow-orange bill and a small dark mask connecting black lores with a black eye-ring. The subspecies show varying amounts of yellow in their plumage, particularly on the face and underparts. Young birds resemble their parents, but have less brightly colored bills.

It feeds on insects, nectar, pollen, and small fruits, and is a major pollinator of several species of Rhododendron. It is also a minor partner in a symbiotic relationship with the pitcher-plant Nepenthes lowii. Little is known about its breeding ecology. Its nest is a shallow cup made of rootlets and lined with bits of moss. The female lays a single egg, and the nestling takes 14–15 days to fledge after hatching. The International Union for Conservation of Nature lists it as a species of least concern. Although its population has not been quantified, it is very common across much of its range.

== Taxonomy and systematics ==
Richard Bowdler Sharpe first described the mountain blackeye in 1888, using a specimen collected on Mount Kinabalu in northern Borneo. He named it Chlorocharis emiliae, putting it into a monotypic genus that he created for the species. It remained in that genus for more than a century, with its affinities to other members of Zosteropidae (white-eye) family unclear. However, molecular phylogenetic studies done early in the 21st century showed that it actually nested comfortably within the genus Zosterops, leading Chlorocharis to be subsumed into that larger genus. Phylogenetic studies have shown that it is more closely related to species on other Sundaland islands than it is to species in Borneo's lowlands.

There are four recognized subspecies. These show a clinal variation. Those in the north are the largest, darkest, and relatively longest-tailed, while those in the south are the smallest, palest, and relatively shortest-tailed. Mitochondrial DNA studies have shown that the species divides neatly into two clades, one in Sabah and the other in Sarawak. Researchers theorize that the subspecies that make up the two clades were separated by glacial events, diverging as long ago as the mid-Pleistocene.

- Z. e. emiliae, described by Sharpe in 1888, is found on Mount Kinabalu and Mount Tambuyukon, which are both located in the Malaysian state of Sabah.
- Z. e. trinitae, first described by Tom Harrisson in 1957, is found on Mount Trus Madi in Sabah.
- Z. e. fusciceps, first described in 1954 by Gerlof Mees, is found in the southern part of the Crocker Range, in the Maga Mountains.
- Z. e. moultani, first described in 1927 by Frederick Nutter Chasen and Cecil Boden Kloss, is found in western Sarawak and West Kalimantan.

The genus name Zosterops is a combination of the Ancient Greek words zoster, meaning "girdle" or "belt" and ops meaning "eye". The species name emiliae has been said to commemorate Emilie Hose, wife of Charles Hose, an English administrator, naturalist and collector, but this was not explained by Bowdler Sharpe and seems mistaken. Other common names include olive blackeye or simply black-eye.

== Description ==
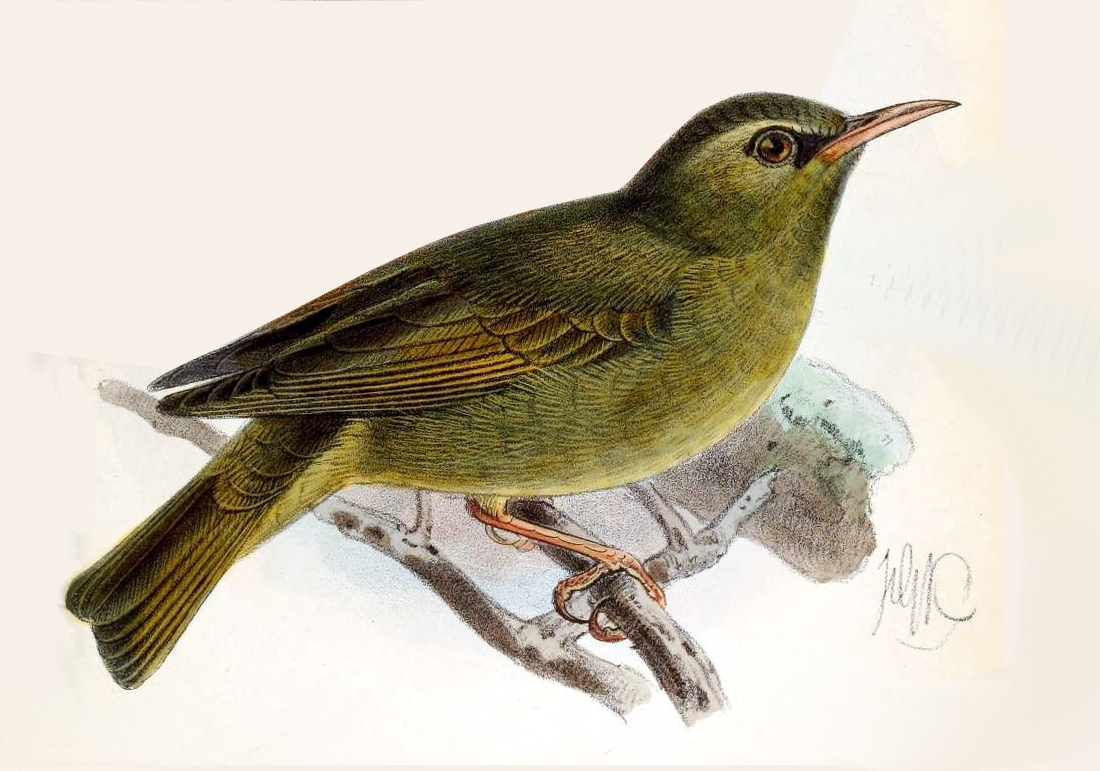
Illustrated by Keulemans (1888)

The mountain blackeye is a small passerine, ranging in length from 11 to 14 cm (4.3 to 5.5 in). Compared to most other white-eyes, it is larger and longer-tailed. The only known measured individual (sex unknown) weighed 13.9 g (0.49 oz). Male and female are similarly plumaged. The adult of the nominate race, emiliae, is dark olive-green on the head and upperparts with a blackish tinge to the green, particularly on the crown. Its underparts are somewhat paler, with a yellowish tint, particularly towards the center of the belly. It has a black eye-ring and black lores, which connect to form a small dark mask, edged by a yellow border. It has a bright yellow-green supraloral and throat. Its iris is brown, and its long, slender, pointed, decurved bill is brown on the upper mandible and bright yellow-orange on the lower. Its legs and feet are dark yellowish-brown to black, with yellow soles. The immature bird is like the adult, though with a duller-colored bill; this is typically dull orange to blackish.

The subspecies trinitae is similar to emiliae, but brighter and more yellowish overall. Its belly is almost completely yellow, and it shows more yellow on the face. The subspecies fusciceps is smaller and relatively shorter-tailed than emiliae, with a sepia tint to its crown and forehead. Its underparts are yellow. The subspecies moultoni is similar to fusciceps. It is the palest of the subspecies, showing more yellow in its plumage; its underparts are dark green.

=== Vocalizations ===
The mountain blackeye has a melodious song, variously transcribed as "wit-weet-weet-weet-weetee-weetee-tee" or "werwit-kukewtoweeo". It also sings a shorter titiweeio". One of its calls is a sharp "pweet". Its wings make a distinctive noise when it flies: a whirring trrt trrt, while its flight call is transcribed as "gujuguju" (with a short "u" sound). It has a trio of perching calls: "wi-u", "siwi-u", and "ie-wio".

== Distribution and habitat ==
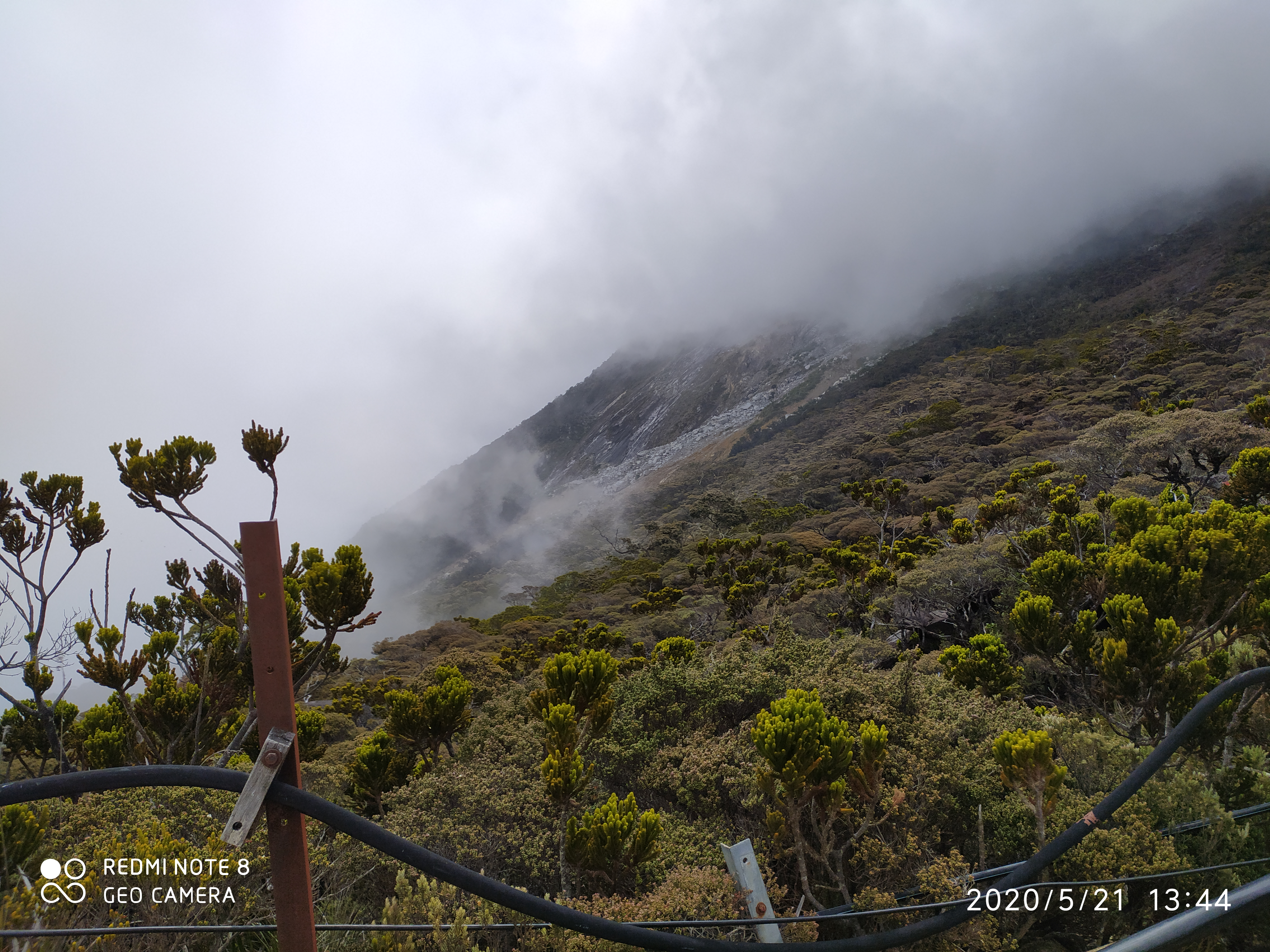
The mountain blackeye is the most common bird in summit scrub, such as this on Mount Kinabalu.

The mountain blackeye is endemic to the high mountains of Borneo, where it is the most common bird on the summit slopes of the island's highest mountains: Kinabalu, Tambuyukon and Trus Madi. It is also found on several isolated lower mountains. It occurs in both Malaysian states (Sabah and Sarawak) and four of the five Indonesian provinces (North Kalimantan, East Kalimantan, Central Kalimantan, and West Kalimantan) on the island, but has never been recorded in Brunei. Its habitats include primary upper montane forest, summit scrub, and gully vegetation. While it generally occurs at elevations above 1,800 m (5,900 ft), it may move to lower elevations during periods of drought.

== Ecology ==
Much of the life history and ecology of the mountain blackeye is not well-known. The species is resident, with no migratory movements. Its generation length is estimated at 4.4 years.

=== Feeding ===
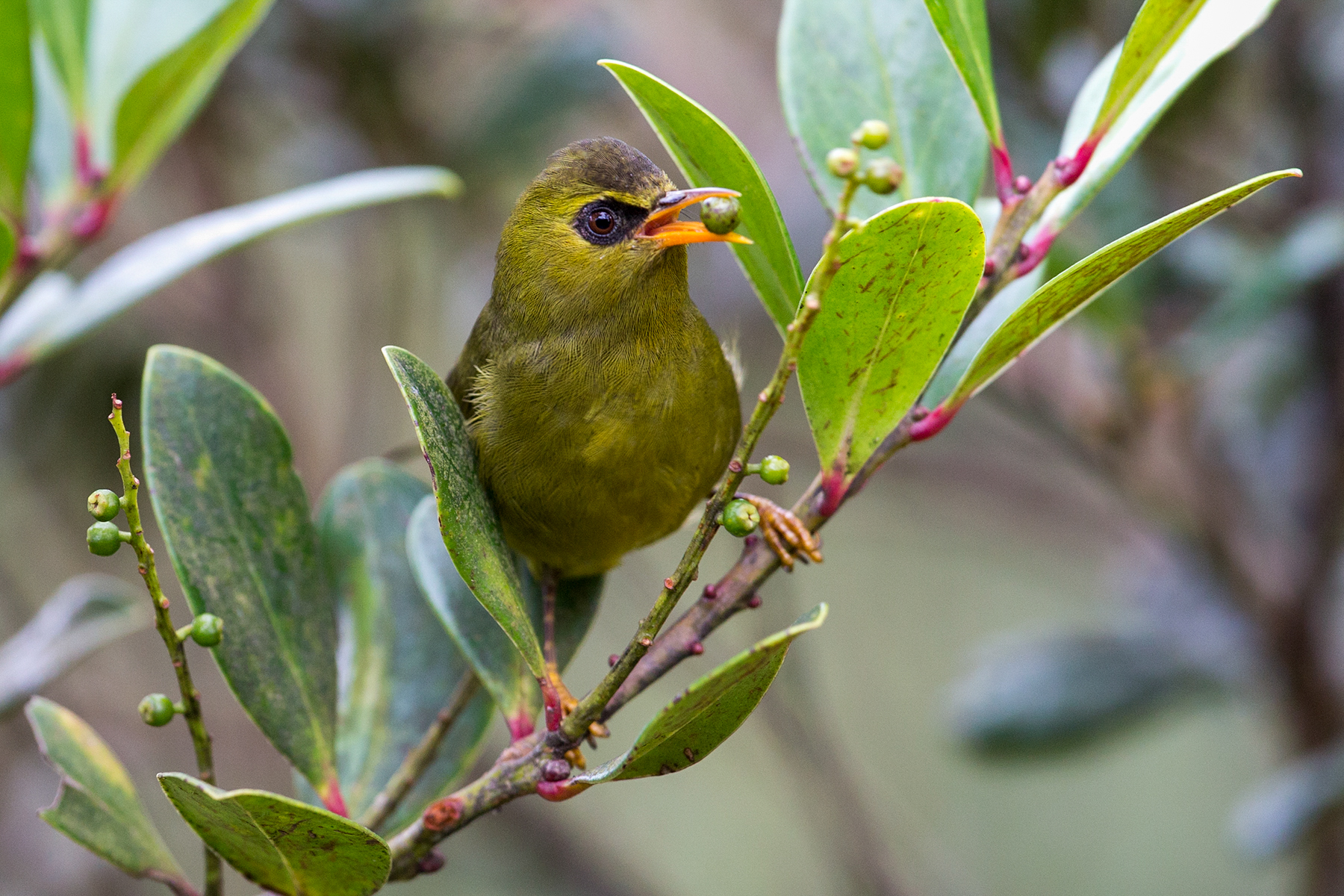
The mountain blackeye's diet includes nectar, pollen, insects, and small berries.

The mountain blackeye feeds on nectar, pollen, insects (particularly caterpillars, grasshoppers and beetles), and small berries, including raspberries. It has a modified tongue—tubular with a brush-like tip—which allows it to easily sip nectar. It feeds at all heights, from the ground to the canopy, often foraging in small groups. It visits the flowers of Eugenia, Schima, Elaeocarpus and several Rhododendron species. Studies indicate that it may be an important pollinator of Rhododendron buxifolium; it also regularly visits Rhododendron ericoides and Rhododendron acuminatum. It is an occasional partner in a symbiotic relationship with Nepenthes lowii, a pitcher-plant which is also endemic to Borneo. The plant produces waxy secretions on the lid of its pitcher. Although treeshrews are the primary consumers of these secretions, mountain blackeyes also partake, sometimes defecating into the pitchers as they do so. Treeshrew and bird feces provide nutrients for the plant; studies have shown that some plants get 57–100% of their nitrogen from animal feces. Because the waxy secretions are produced year-round, they can be an important food source for mountain blackeyes when other plants are not in flower, or when insects are hard to find.

=== Breeding ===
The breeding ecology of the mountain blackeye is only poorly known. It breeds in February, March, June, and September. The nest is a shallow cup made of rootlets and dried grass, and lined with the sporophyte stalks or setae of mosses. It measures roughly 7.5 cm (3.0 in) across and is typically built in the fork of a branch of a Leptospermum tree within 1 to 8 m (3 to 26 ft) of the ground. The female lays a single egg, and the hatched nestling takes 14–15 days to fledge. Because of the low temperatures and high moisture levels at the elevations where mountain blackeyes breed, the birds spend considerable time incubating their chick early in its development, when it cannot regulate its own body temperature. This means that they spend less time foraging for food for the chick, which delays its development. When nests were experimentally heated and covered against the rain, parents spent less time at the nest, chicks gained weight faster, grew wing feathers quicker, and fledged earlier.

== Status ==
The International Union for Conservation of Nature rates the mountain blackeye as a species of least concern. Although it is range-restricted, it is very common across much of its range, though western populations are much more localized. Its overall population size has not been quantified, but it is thought to be declining, primarily due to habitat destruction and fragmentation. Much of its range is protected by parks or forest reserves, including Kinabalu Park (which protects Mounts Kinabalu and Tambuyukon), and Crocker Range Park (which protects much of the area around Mount Kinabalu). However, protection does not necessarily forestall habitat destruction, as for example, permission has been granted for extensive logging in the forest reserve on Mount Trus Madi.

== Citations ==
=== References ===
- BirdLife International (2016). "Mountain Blackeye: Chlorocharis emiliae". IUCN Red List of Threatened Species. 2016 e.T22714332A94412075. doi:10.2305/IUCN.UK.2016-3.RLTS.T22714332A94412075.en.
- Borneo Today (18 May 2017). "Priceworth Gets Green Light To Log 'Controversial' Sabah Forest Reserve". Archived from the original on May 21, 2017.
- Chin, Lijin; Moran, Jonathan A. & Clarke, Charles (April 2010). "Trap geometry in three giant montane pitcher plant species from Borneo is a function of tree shrew body size". The New Phytologist. 186 (2): 461–470. Bibcode:2010NewPh.186..461C. doi:10.1111/j.1469-8137.2009.03166.x. JSTOR 27797568. PMID 20100203.
- Choi, Er Ah; Tsuey, Chong Sheau; Biun, Alim; Adam, Jumaat (2011). "The Nascent Ecotourism Journey for Mt. Tambuyukon" (PDF). Australian Journal of Basic and Applied Sciences. 5 (12): 3318–3322. ISSN 1991-8178. Archived (PDF) from the original on 2 July 2019.
- Gill, Frank; Donsker, David; Rasmussen, Pamela (2021). "Sylviid babblers, parrotbills, white-eyes". IOC World Bird List.
- Jobling, James A. (2010). The Helm Dictionary of Scientific Bird Names. London, UK: Christopher Helm. ISBN 978-1-4081-2501-4.
- Kudo, Gaku & Suzuki, Shizuo (September 2004). "Flowering Phenology of Tropical-Alpine Dwarf Trees on Mount Kinabalu, Borneo". Journal of Tropical Ecology. 20 (5): 563–571. doi:10.1017/S0266467404001841. JSTOR 4091902. S2CID 86565560.
- Gawin, Dency F.; Rahman, Mustafa Abdul; Ramji, Mohamad Fizl Sidq; Smith, Brian Tilston; Lim, Haw Chuan; Moyle, Robert G. & Sheldon, Frederick H. (January 2014). "Patterns of avian diversification in Borneo: The case of the endemic Mountain Black-eye (Chlorocharis emiliae)". The Auk. 131 (1): 86–99. doi:10.1642/AUK-13-190.1. hdl:1808/16597. JSTOR 90008069. S2CID 13787326.
- Lim, B.T.M.; Sadanandan, K.R.; Dingle, C.; Leung, Y.Y.; Prawiradilaga, D.M.; Irham, M.; Ashari, H.; Lee, J.G.H. & Rheindt, F.E. (2018). "Molecular evidence suggests radical revision of species limits in the great speciator white‑eye genus Zosterops". Journal of Ornithology. 160 (1): 1–16. doi:10.1007/s10336-018-1583-7. S2CID 51890116.
- Mitchell, Adam E.; Boersma, Jordan; Anthony, Anthonio; Kitayama, Kanehiro; Martin, Thomas E. (24 June 2020). "Slow growth and development of a montane songbird reflects parental responses to harsh weather". American Society of Naturalists.
- Moyle, Robert G.; Filardi, Christopher F.; Smith, Catherine E. & Diamond, Jared (10 February 2009). "Explosive Pleistocene diversification and hemispheric expansion of a "great speciator"" (PDF). Proceedings of the National Academy of Sciences of the United States of America. 106 (6): 1863–1868. Bibcode:2009PNAS..106.1863M. doi:10.1073/pnas.0809861105. JSTOR 40421688. PMC 2644129. PMID 19181851.
- Myers, Susan (2016). Birds of Borneo (2nd ed.). London, UK: Christopher Helm. ISBN 978-1-4729-2444-5.
- Phillipps, Quentin & Phillipps, Karen (2014). Phillipps' Field Guide to the Birds of Borneo: Sabah, Sarawak, Brunei, and Kalimantan (3rd ed.). Princeton, NJ: Princeton University Press. ISBN 978-0-691-16167-9.
- Sabah Parks (2021). "Crocker Range Park". The Official Sabah Parks Website. Archived from the original on 5 May 2021.
- Sheldon, Frederick H.; Moyle, Robert G. & Kennard, Jody (2001). "Ornithology of Sabah: History, Gazetteer, Annotated Checklist, and Bibliography". Ornithological Monographs. 52: iii–vi, 1–285. ISBN 978-1-891276-24-8.
- Smith, J. M. B. (March 1980). "The Vegetation of the Summit Zone of Mount Kinabalu". The New Phytologist. 84 (3): 547–573. Bibcode:1980NewPh..84..547S. doi:10.1111/j.1469-8137.1980.tb04562.x. JSTOR 2432129.
- van Balen, Bas (2008). "Family Zosteropidae (White-eyes)". In del Hoyo, Josep; Elliott, Andrew & Christie, David (eds.). Handbook of the Birds of the World. Vol. 13: Penduline-tits to Shrikes. Barcelona, Spain: Lynx Edicions. ISBN 978-84-96553-45-3.
