= James Guthrie Davidson =

British lawyer and colonial administrator

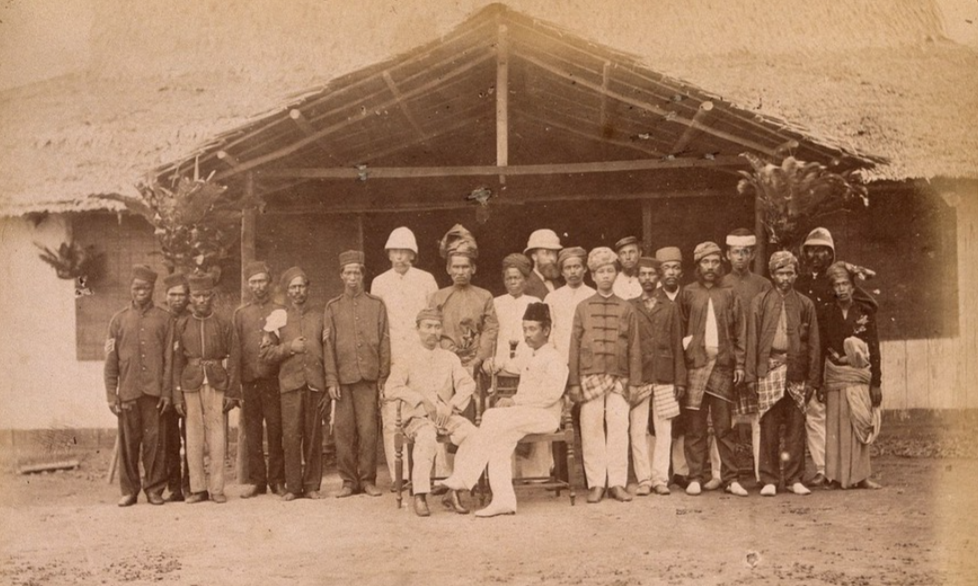
- Davidson standing middle right with Birch middle left in Selangor in April 1874

1st British Resident of Selangor
- In office 1875–1875
- Preceded by: Position established
- Succeeded by: Bloomfield Douglas

2nd British Resident of Perak
- In office 1876–1877
- Preceded by: James W. W. Birch
- Succeeded by: Hugh Low

Personal details
- Born: 1837
- Died: 8 February 1891 (aged 53–54) Singapore
- Occupation: Lawyer and colonial administrator

James Guthrie Davidson (1837 – 8 February 1891) a native of Scotland, was a lawyer and a colonial administrator in Malaya in the 19th century.

== Early life ==
James Guthrie Davidson was born in Scotland in 1837, and was admitted as a solicitor of the Supreme Court of Scotland in February, 1861. After working for a short time in a leading law firm in Edinburgh, he went to Singapore later that year to join his uncle, James Guthrie, who was a well-known merchant in Singapore, and became a law agent.

== Career ==
In Singapore, Davidson met Robert Carr Woods, who was a prominent lawyer, and the first editor of the Straits Times, who had been living in Singapore since 1845, and they went into partnership in late 1861, creating the law firm of Woods and Davidson. He was subsequently admitted to the Singapore Bar, and continued to work at the firm with Woods until 1871, gaining a reputation as one of the finest lawyers to have practised in Singapore. Woods had a large native clientele throughout the Malay Peninsula, and Davidson, during his ten years in partnership with him, gathered a similar following, developing ties with local leaders and business interests in the Native States, and an in depth knowledge of their customs and practices.

When, in 1874, Sir Andrew Clarke, Governor of the Straits Settlements, was seeking a suitable appointee to act as Resident of Selangor following a request from the Sultan to send him officers to assist him in his unsettled state, Davidson was recommended for the position. After Frank Swettenham acted as Resident in a temporary capacity for several months, Davidson was formerly appointed first British Resident of Selangor on 20 January 1875 and sent to Klang. Davidson and the Viceroy at Klang were friends and according to Swettenham, who later succeeded him, Davidson, "was able to establish a Government Treasury with a proper system of accounts, to organise a police force, and initiate such simple reforms as were required in a small place like Klang."

Davidson's appointment in Selangor lasted ten months, and in April 1876 he was appointed Resident of Perak, following the murder of first Resident of Perak James W.W. Birch in November 1875 by a local chief. After the Perak War which followed Birch's assassination, the administration in Perak was bankrupt and discontent continued to simmer in the state. Davidson himself was also a reluctant pick - the Colonial Office was uncomfortable to confirm him due to his own financial relationship with both the Malay royals and Chinese in Selangor, and so given the financial situation only provided him with a provisional confirmation. Although he was judged to be competent and experienced, his relatively low pay, insecurity, preference for Selangor, and disagreements with the governor over policy led to him ceasing to engage with it by the end of the year. He resigned as Resident of Perak, and from government service, on 10 February 1877.

Davidson briefly returned to England, and returned to Singapore to rejoin the legal profession with a Straits Settlements lawyer, Bernard Rodyk, and they established the firm of Rodyk and Davidson, which continues today as Dentons Rodyk, his previous partner in Singapore, Robert Woods, having died in 1875.

Davidson died in Singapore on 8 February 1891 when he was involved in a carriage accident whilst travelling from his home to the cathedral.
