= Borneo thrush =

- At Kinabalu Park

Scientific classification
- Kingdom: Animalia
- Phylum: Chordata
- Class: Aves
- Order: Passeriformes
- Family: Turdidae
- Genus: Turdus
- Species: T. javanicus
- Subspecies: T. j. seebohmi

Trinomial name
- Turdus javanicus seebohmi (Sharpe, 1888)

Subspecies of bird

The Borneo thrush (Turdus javanicus seebohmi), also known as the mountain blackbird or locally in Dusun as Luhui tana, is a bird in the thrush family. It is a subspecies of the Sundaic island thrush (Turdus javanicus) endemic to the island of Borneo.

== Description ==
The Borneo thrush is mainly dark brown in colour. The flanks, lower breast and belly are rufous, with a white vent. It is about 23 cm in length. Its bill, eye-ring and legs are deep yellow. Males and females are similar in size and appearance.

== Distribution and habitat ==
The subspecies is found only on the higher levels of Mount Kinabalu (4,095 m), normally from about 2,100 m asl upwards to the limits of vegetation, as well as around the summits of Mount Trus Madi (2,642 m) and Mount Tambuyukon (2,579 m), all of which lie in the state of Sabah, Malaysia. The habitat ranges from cold, wet and mossy montane forest up to, on Kinabalu, almost bare rock at about 3,200 m asl.

== Behaviour ==
=== Breeding ===
The nest is described as being a substantial structure, made of woven plant material and lined with grass, 15 cm across by 10 cm deep. It is built a few metres above the ground in a fork or the branches of the low trees found at the altitude at which it lives. The normal clutch is a single egg. Nests with eggs or chicks have been recorded in February and March, suggesting a restricted breeding season.

=== Feeding ===
The birds forage through the forest in the trees and on the ground. The diet is largely vegetarian, mainly fruit and berries, though insects are also taken.

=== Voice ===
A loud melodious song and rattling alarm calls have been recorded.
