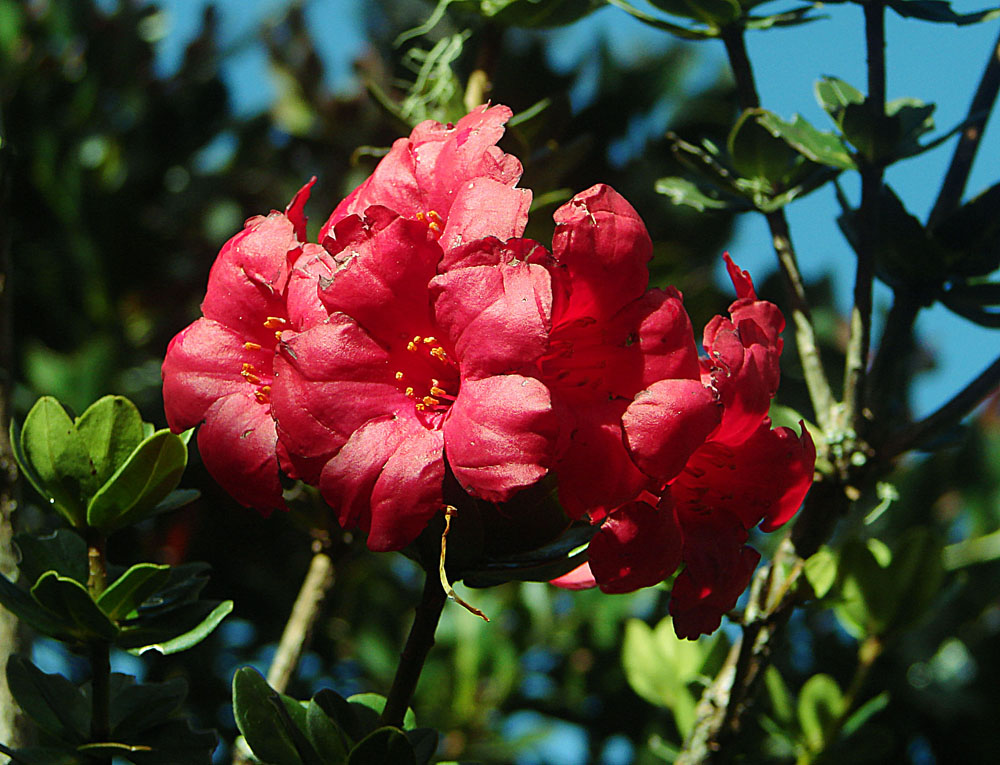

Conservation status
- Vulnerable (IUCN 3.1)

Scientific classification
- Kingdom: Plantae
- Clade: Embryophytes
- Clade: Tracheophytes
- Clade: Spermatophytes
- Clade: Angiosperms
- Clade: Eudicots
- Clade: Asterids
- Order: Ericales
- Family: Ericaceae
- Genus: Rhododendron
- Species: R. buxifolium

Binomial name
- Rhododendron buxifolium H.Low ex Hook.f.

Synonyms
- Rhododendron buxifolium var. robustum Sleumer

= Rhododendron buxifolium =

Species of flowering plant

Rhododendron buxifolium is a species of rhododendron native to Borneo. It is a shrub or small tree, found only at high elevations on Mount Kinabalu in Malaysia's Sabah state.

It is a tree up to 10 m (33 ft) tall, and can grow to its full height in the subalpine forests and shrublands. In the Alpine zone closer to the summit, it grows as a stunted shrub among rocks. The species name buxifolium means 'box-leaved', because its small glossy leaves resemble those of boxwood (Buxus spp.).

It is endemic to the upper elevations of Mount Kinabalu, Borneo's highest peak. It grows in subalpine and alpine shrublands from 3,100 to 3,900 metres (10,200 to 12,800 ft) elevation. The species' estimated area of occupancy (AOO) and extent of occurrence (EOO) are both 40 km^{2} (15 sq mi).

The species' habitat is protected within Kinabalu Park, and neither its range nor its population are currently declining. Because of its restricted range and habitat, it remains vulnerable to threats like landslides, drought, and the effects of climate change.
