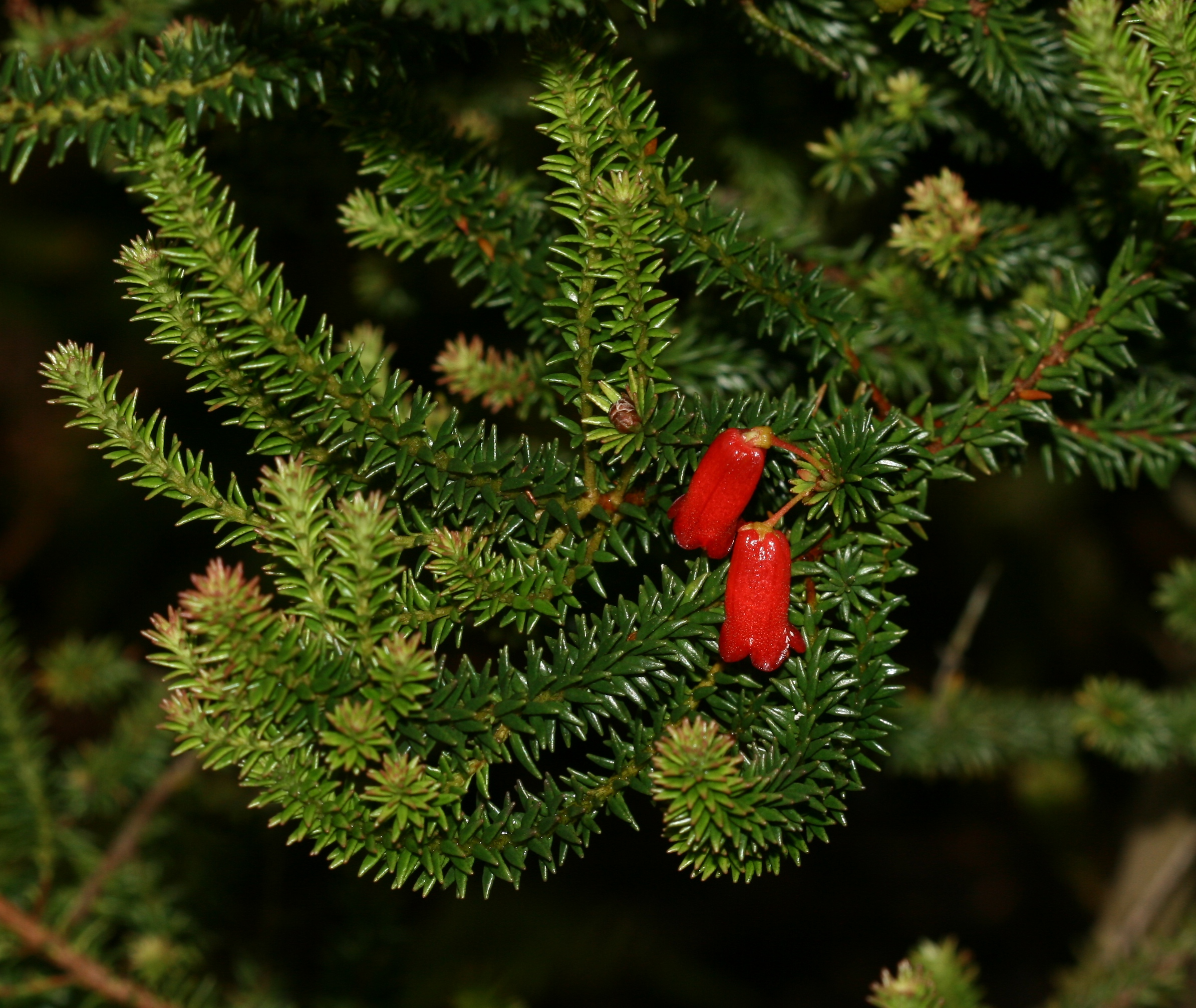

Scientific classification
- Kingdom: Plantae
- Clade: Embryophytes
- Clade: Tracheophytes
- Clade: Spermatophytes
- Clade: Angiosperms
- Clade: Eudicots
- Clade: Asterids
- Order: Ericales
- Family: Ericaceae
- Genus: Rhododendron
- Species: R. ericoides

Binomial name
- Rhododendron ericoides H.Low ex Hook.f.

= Rhododendron ericoides =

Species of flowering plant

Rhododendron ericoides is a species of rhododendron native to Borneo. It is found only on Mount Kinabalu. It is native to subalpine and alpine shrublands above 2,600 meters (8,500 ft) elevation.

Rhododendron ericoides is an erect of prostrate shrub, growing up to 1.5 m (4.9 ft) tall and rarely to 3 m (9.8 ft). It has small leaves, 0.4–0.8 cm long by 0.08–0.16 cm wide, and linear or very narrowly elliptic in shape.
