= James Low (East India Company officer) =

Scottish military officer (1791–1852)

James Low (4 April 1791 – 1852) was a Scottish military officer with the East India Company who was known for his writings on the Thai language and the art and culture of the Malay Peninsula.

== Life and career ==
Low was born on 4 April 1791 at Kingskettle in Fife, Scotland to Alexander Low and his wife Ann Thompson. The British Malayan colonial officer Hugh Low shares the same surname, but is no relation.

He graduated from Edinburgh College and was then nominated for a cadetship in the East India Company's Madras Army in 1812. He was accepted and embarked from Portsmouth on the East Indiaman Astell, which reached Madras in July 1812. During the first five years, Low acquired military competencies and language skills. The company's policy was that their officers had to be capable of basic communication with the Indian soldiers under their command. In May 1817 Low was appointed adjudant, and then promoted to the rank of lieutenant in August of the same year. In January 1819 Low moved to the East India Company's settlement in Penang and spent the rest of his career in and around the Straits of Malacca. In 1820 he was given command of the Penang Local Corps until the corps was disbanded in 1827.

Since Low had received a mathematical and philosophical education at Edinburgh College, he nurtured an interest in the study of languages. The posting to Penang offered the opportunity to acquire language skills in both Malay and Thai. The knowledge of Thai was particularly important in the light of events on the Malay Peninsula, to which the Burmese had sent their last military expedition against Siam, directed at its west coast territories. Subsequently, the British at Penang found themselves in the middle of a conflict between the Siamese Governor, known as the Raja of Ligor (Nakhon Si Thammarat), and the Sultan of Kedah, who had fled to Penang instead of providing the support which had been requested from him by the Raja of Ligor.

Low's was the second mission to Siam, following John Crawfurd's first mission that was mainly concerned with resolving the legal status of Penang. The second mission of 1824 under Low's command was prompted by the British declaration of war on Burma. Its aim was to enlist the support of the Raja of Ligor, who was in command of most of the Siamese territories on the west coast of the peninsula including Kedah, for the planned British move up the Irrawaddy River. Low described the events of the mission in a report on his Public Mission to His Highness the Rajah of Ligor, and in more detail in his Journal of a Public Mission to the Rajah of Ligor. Low also produced a map of Siam, Cambodia and Laos. After his mission to Ligor, he was posted to Tenasserim where he produced more maps and landscape drawings. In 1826, Low was promoted to captain and was sent on other missions to the Malay state of Perak. Shortly after, he was appointed Superintendent of Lands in Province Wellesley in Penang, a post he held until 1840 when he was made Assistant Resident of Singapore. He finally retired in 1845 but returned to Edinburgh only in 1850, where he died two years later.

== Scholarship ==
Although Low's main responsibility as an officer of the East India Company was to settle disputes with local chiefs in the interests of the British—a task he did not always succeed in fulfilling—he was also a pioneer in the study of Thai language, literature and art by Westerners. The lack of textbooks inspired him to produce A Grammar of the Thai or Siamese Language (1828), and he published a collection of works On the Government, the Literature, and the Mythology of the Siamese (1831–36) as well as articles on Thai Buddhist art, Buddhist law, local histories and ethnic minorities of the Malay Peninsula. He also studied inscriptions and translated parts of Thai Buddhist scriptures, and the Malay historical text from Kedah, Merong Mahawangsa. Low's ability to observe and then describe in detail a variety of aspects of Thai art and culture helped to make his mission journal an interesting source for the study of everyday life and cultural practices in 19th-century Siam.

Low had a strong interest in Thai art, and amassed a large collection of fine paintings and drawings from southern Thailand. Part of his collection of Thai drawings and paintings was acquired by the British Museum in 1866 and is now held in the British Library. Another part is held in the Royal Asiatic Society in London. Although not much research has been done on Low's art collection, it is a popular source of inspiration for Thai designers.
