= Calamaria lovii =

Conservation status
- Least Concern (IUCN 3.1)

Scientific classification
- Kingdom: Animalia
- Phylum: Chordata
- Class: Reptilia
- Order: Squamata
- Suborder: Serpentes
- Family: Colubridae
- Genus: Calamaria
- Species: C. lovii

Binomial name
- Calamaria lovii Boulenger, 1887
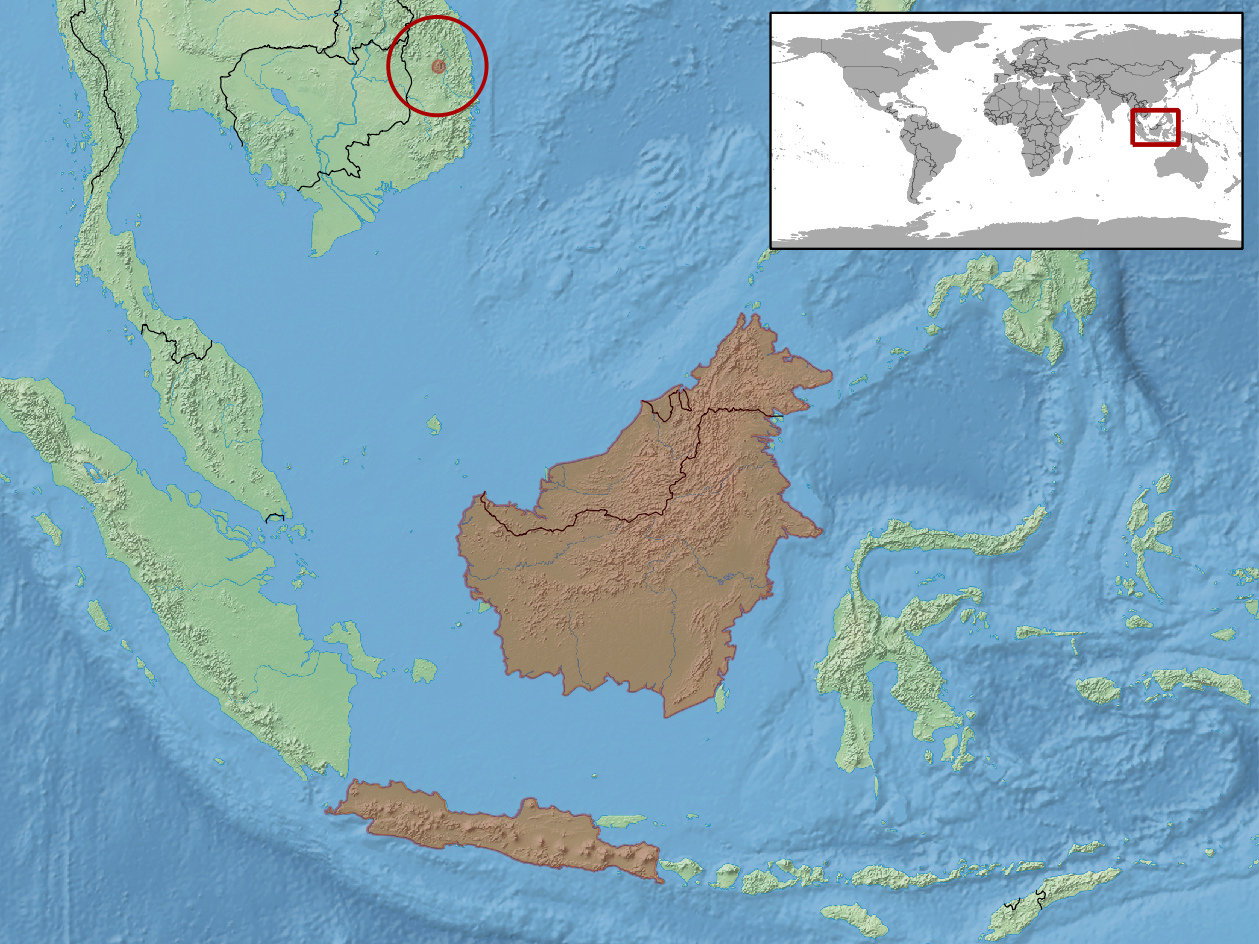

Species of snake

Calamaria lovii, also known commonly as Lovi's reed snake, Low's reed snake, and Lowi's reed snake, is a species of snake in the subfamily Calamariinae of the family, Colubridae. The species is native to Southeast Asia. There are four recognized subspecies.

== Description ==
A small species, Calamaria lovii may attain a snout-to-vent length (SVL) of about 30 cm (12 in), plus a tail length of about 2 cm (0.79 in). Dorsally, it is dark brown; ventrally, it is yellow.

== Geographic range ==
Calamaria lovii is found in Indonesia, Malaysia, and Vietnam.

== Habitat ==
The preferred natural habitat of Calamaria lovii is forest, at altitudes from sea level to 750 m (2,460 ft).

== Behavior ==
Calamaria lovii is terrestrial and fossorial.

== Reproduction ==
Calamaria lovii is oviparous.

== Subspecies ==
Four subspecies are recognized as being valid, including the nominotypical subspecies.

- Calamaria lovii gimletti Boulenger, 1905
- Calamaria lovii ingermarxorum Darevsky & Orlov, 1992
- Calamaria lovii lovii Boulenger, 1887
- Calamaria lovii wermuthi Inger & Marx, 1965

== Etymology ==
The specific name, lovii, is in honor of British colonial administrator Hugh Brooke Low, who was an amateur naturalist.
