= Dentons Rodyk & Davidson =

Law firm based in Singapore

Dentons Rodyk & Davidson LLP
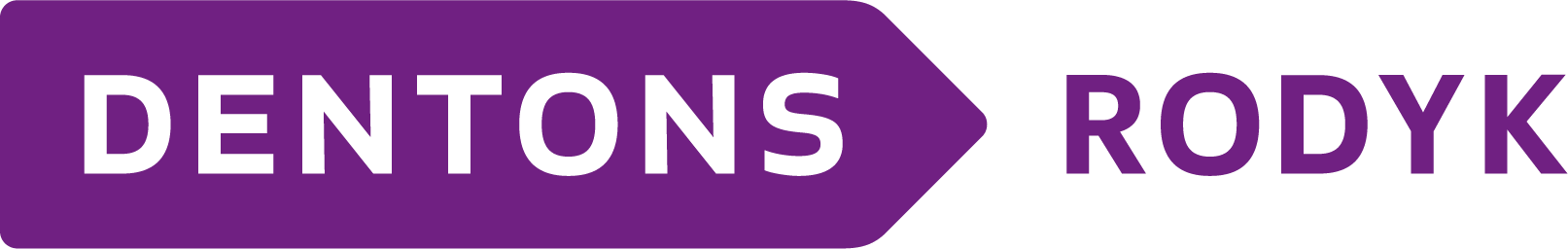
- Headquarters: Polycentric - Singapore Office: Dentons Rodyk
- No. of offices: Over 200
- No. of attorneys: Over 200
- No. of employees: 450
- Major practice areas: Corporate, finance, intellectual property, litigation, arbitration, and real estate
- Key people: Gerald Singham, JP, BBM, PBM (Dentons Rodyk Managing Partner, Dentons ASEAN CEO, and Global Vice Chair); Edric Pan (Deputy Managing Partner); Loh Kia Meng (Chief Operating Officer and Senior Partner)
- Date founded: 1861; 165 years ago
- Founders: Robert Carr Woods; James Guthrie Davidson
- Company type: Limited liability partnership
- Website: dentons.rodyk.com

Dentons Rodyk & Davidson LLP is a law firm based in Singapore. It has offices in Singapore and Myanmar, and operates in jurisdictions of Singapore, Australia, England, Wales, and India. It is one of the oldest and largest law firms in Singapore.

Founded in 1861 as Woods & Davidson, it was renamed as Rodyk & Davidson in 1877. In 2016, it was combined with Dentons and later renamed as Dentons Rodyk & Davidson.

== History ==
=== 1861–1877: Woods & Davidson ===
Dentons Rodyk & Davidson traces its beginnings to the partnership of Woods & Davidson, founded in 1861 by Robert Carr Woods and James Guthrie Davidson.

=== 1877–2016: Rodyk & Davidson ===
Following Woods’s death, Bernard Rodyk joined Davidson in 1877, after which it was renamed Rodyk & Davidson. The firm established an office in Shanghai in 1996 and was the first foreign law firm to be granted a licence to operate there.

The firm was registered under the Limited Liability Partnership Act with effect from April 2007. In 2011, Phillip Jeyaretnam was elected managing partner. He was succeeded by Gerald Singham in 2020 following Jeyaretnam's appointment as a Judicial Commissioner of the Supreme Court of Singapore. Both have served as Global Vice-Chair and ASEAN Chief Executive Officer of Dentons.

=== 2016–present: Dentons Rodyk & Davidson ===
In 2016, the firm combined with global law firm Dentons and was renamed Dentons Rodyk & Davidson LLP. Following the combination, the firm became part of Dentons, a global law firm with more than 200 offices in over 80 countries. Dentons Rodyk was the first firm in the Association of Southeast Asian Nations (ASEAN) to combine with Dentons. Dentons ASEAN subsequently established a presence across multiple ASEAN jurisdictions, including Singapore, Myanmar, Indonesia, Thailand, Malaysia, Vietnam, and the Philippines.

In 2017, the firm established the Dentons Rodyk Dialogue, an annual event jointly hosted with Singapore Management University, which focuses on legal, business, cultural, and economic developments in Asia.

== Operations ==
Dentons Rodyk is based in Singapore and operates an additional office in Myanmar. The firm operates in the jurisdictions of Singapore, Australia, England, Wales, and India.

Dentons Rodyk practice areas include banking and finance, energy, infrastructure, mergers and acquisitions, capital markets, regulatory compliance, fintech, trusts and estates, wealth planning, intellectual property, and corporate real estate. Dispute resolution services include commercial litigation, international arbitration, restructuring and insolvency, bankruptcy, and white-collar crime investigations.

In 2022, amid the COVID-19 pandemic, Dentons Rodyk transitioned to remote working and expanded its use of digital workflows and artificial intelligence tools for document review to support business continuity during work from home measures. The firm later resumed office operations, replacing individual workstations with open and shared workspaces. Hybrid work policies were introduced, including financial support for home office setups and a rotational work-from-home system.

== Charitable initiatives ==
In 2021, Dentons Rodyk established an environmental, social, and governance (ESG) practice.

In 2021, Dentons Rodyk formed a joint initiative with the Singapore Association of Women Lawyers (SAWL) to raise funds for the SAWL Scholarship Fund, which supports educational access for students with physical or mental disabilities.

In 2022, Dentons Rodyk established a philanthropy and non-profit practice to provide legal advice to charitable organizations and donors. The firm has acted as an anchor firm for the Law Society of Singapore's Community Legal Clinics and has supported the Criminal Legal Aid Scheme since 2015. A formal pro bono policy was implemented in 2018.

== Notable lawyers and alumni ==
- James Guthrie Davidson, founding partner of the firm.
- Philip Jeyaretnam, SC, former Managing Partner and Judge of the Supreme Court of Singapore.
- Quentin Loh, SC, former Judge of the Appellate Division of the High Court of the Supreme Court of Singapore
- Robert Carr Woods, founding partner and first editor of the Straits Times.
- Zhulkarnain Abdul Rahim, currently a Minister of State with the Singapore Government.

== Awards and recognition ==
Dentons Rodyk was recognized in The Straits Times Singapore’s Best Law Firms rankings in the Charities, Not-for-Profit Associations and Pro Bono category in 2023 and 2024. The firm was also named a conferee of the Champions of Good title in 2022 and 2024.

Dentons Rodyk has been recognized by IFLR1000, The Legal 500 Asia Pacific, Chambers and Partners, Benchmark Litigation Asia Pacific, Lexology, Asian Legal Business, and Asialaw. The firm was named one of The Straits Times Singapore's Best Law Firms from 2021 to 2026. It was also ranked among the top foreign law firms globally for India-related matters by India Business Law Journal in 2024 and 2025.
