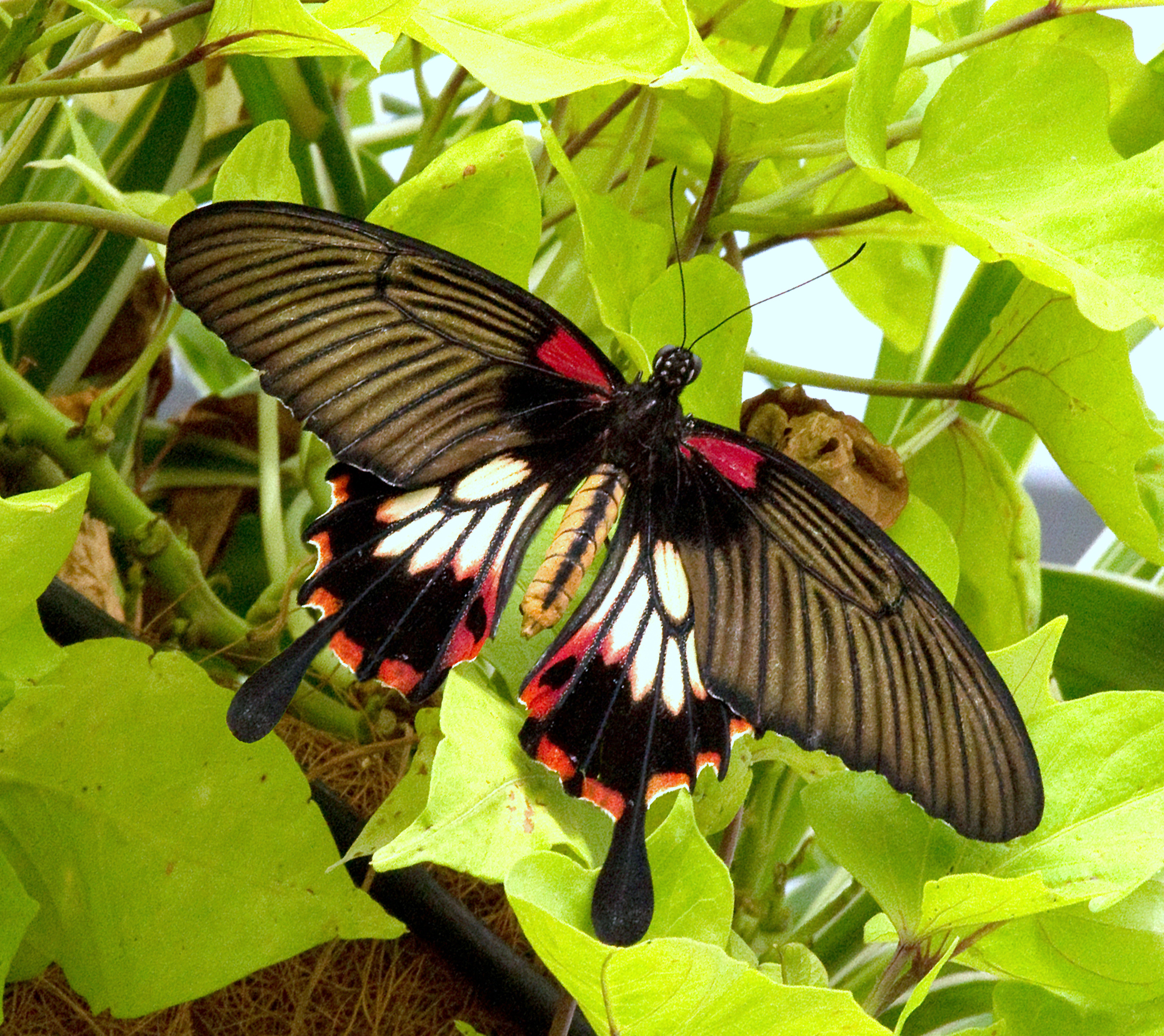
- Dorsal view of female

Scientific classification
- Kingdom: Animalia
- Phylum: Arthropoda
- Clade: Pancrustacea
- Class: Insecta
- Order: Lepidoptera
- Family: Papilionidae
- Genus: Papilio
- Species: P. lowii

Binomial name
- Papilio lowii H. Druce, 1873

Synonyms
- Papilio lowi [sic] H. Druce, 1873, subsequent spelling in Rothschild, 1895; Menelaides memnon lowii (H. Druce, 1873); Page & Treadaway, 2003

= Papilio lowii =

Great yellow Mormon

Species of butterfly

Papilio lowii, the great yellow Mormon or Asian swallowtail, is a butterfly of the family Papilionidae. The species was first described by Herbert Druce in 1873. It is found in Borneo, Indonesia, and the Philippines (Palawan, Balabac).

== Description ==
Wingspan: 107–126 mm (4.2–5.0 in). Male and female tailed. Male black, upper surface of the forewing with rather short blue-grey stripes at the distal margin; hindwing with broad, blue-grey, densely scaled band, which extends nearly to the distal margin, is almost uniformly concave towards the base and does not reach the cell. Female in two principal forms; forewing with the exception of the base much lighter, the red basal spot at least indicated, the blackish stripes between the veins weaker than in the memnon-forms, hindwing with large white, distally yellowish central area, which is intersected by the thin black veins: female-f. zephyria form, nov.) the hindwing almost entirely black, without white area: female -f. suffusus Lathy. — Palawan, Balabac and North Borneo.

== Biology ==
Larvae feed on citrus plants. Adults nectar on various flowers.

Adults of P. lowii, much like other Mormons, mimic the inedible red-bodied swallowtails.

== Taxonomy ==
The taxon, either using the original spelling lowii or a later spelling lowi (after Rothschild, 1895) has been considered a subspecies of Papilio memnon by some authors, such as Page & Treadaway, 2003.

It is named after British colonial administrator and naturalist Sir. Hugh Low, although in the original description of the taxon he was referred to as "Mr. Lowe" with alternative spelling of surname.
