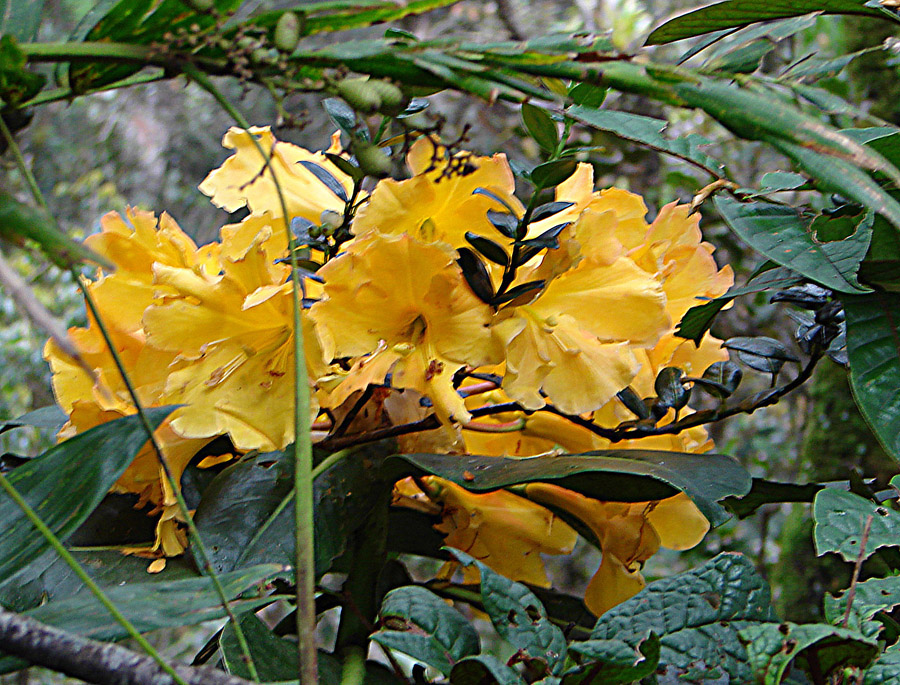

Conservation status
- Least Concern (IUCN 3.1)

Scientific classification
- Kingdom: Plantae
- Clade: Embryophytes
- Clade: Tracheophytes
- Clade: Spermatophytes
- Clade: Angiosperms
- Clade: Eudicots
- Clade: Asterids
- Order: Ericales
- Family: Ericaceae
- Genus: Rhododendron
- Species: R. lowii

Binomial name
- Rhododendron lowii Hook.f.

= Rhododendron lowii =

Species of flowering plant

Rhododendron lowii is a species of rhododendron native to Borneo. It is found in the Crocker Range and Mount Kinabalu of Sabah state, in the northeastern portion of the island.

== Description ==
Rhododendron lowii is a large shrub to a small tree, growing up to ten meters tall. It has the largest flowers of any Bornean rhododendron.

== Range and habitat ==
Rhododendron lowii is found in the Crocker Range and on Mount Kinabalu, where it grows in montane forest and subalpine shrubland from 1,200 to 3,650 meters (3,940 to 11,980 ft) elevation.
