= Robert Carr Woods =

British newspaper editor and lawyer

Robert Carr Woods (1816–1875), a native of Lincolnshire, England, is best known from his time in Singapore as first editor of The Straits Times, and subsequently as a lawyer.

== Biography ==
Born in Burgh in England, Woods first published papers on meteorology (including description of a meteor storm in 1837) and was Registrar of the Meteorological Society of London.

He went to India in 1840 and edited the Bombay Courier.

In 1845, Woods moved on to Singapore and was founding editor of The Straits Times. In 1849, an article about James Brooke's anti-piracy activities was instrumental in encouraging Joseph Hume to raise questions in the British Parliament and, together with a petition from Singapore traders which he took round for signature in 1851, eventually culminated in an Inquiry held in Singapore in the autumn of 1854.

Having registered as a law agent in 1849, Woods went on to found Singapore's first law firm, Woods & Davidson, in 1861 The firm then became Rodyk & Davidson in 1877, and Dentons Rodyk in 2014.
