= Hugh Low =

British colonial administrator

Sir Hugh Low GCMG
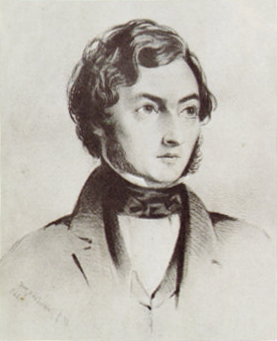
- Hugh Low

4th British Resident of Perak
- In office 1 April 1877 – 31 May 1889
- Preceded by: James G. Davidson
- Succeeded by: Frank A. Swettenham

Acting Governor of Labuan
- In office 1866–1867
- Preceded by: Thomas Fitzgerald Callaghan
- Succeeded by: John Pope Hennessy

Personal details
- Born: 10 May 1824 Upper Clapton, London, United Kingdom
- Died: 18 April 1905 (aged 80) Alassio, Italy
- Spouses: Catherine Napier (m. 1848; died 1851) Siti Hawa (before 1905) Ann Douglas (m. 1885)
- Children: 2

Sir Hugh Low, GCMG (10 May 1824–18 April 1905) was a British colonial administrator and naturalist. After a long residence in various colonial roles in Labuan, he was appointed as British administrator in the Malay Peninsula where he made the first trials of Hevea rubber in the region. He is often considered the first successful British administrator in the region, whose methods became models for subsequent British colonial operation in the entire South East Asia Region.

He made the first documented ascent of Mount Kinabalu in 1851. Both Kinabalu's highest peak as well as the deep gully on the northern side of the mountain are named after him.

== Early life ==
Low was born in Upper Clapton, England, the son of a Scottish horticulturist, also named Hugh. He is not related to James Low, the Scottish East India Company officer active in the northern Malay states and Siam from the 1820s to 1850.

At an early age, he acquired botanical expertise working in the family nursery. At 20, his father sent him on a collecting expedition for orchids to Southeast Asia. He based himself in Singapore but soon joined James Brooke, the White Rajah, in Sarawak. In the months following he became well enough acquainted with interior of Sarawak to write a definitive book on it on his return home. In 1847, Brooke was appointed Governor of the recently established British colony of Labuan and Consul General of Borneo. He made Low his Colonial Secretary (1848–1850) and William Napier Esq., Lieutenant Governor. They, and Napier's daughter, Catherine, returned to the Far East in 1848.

== Labuan ==
Low married Catherine Napier when they reached Singapore on 12 August 1848 at St Andrew's Cathedral. They had a son Hugh "Hugo" Brooke Low (1849–1887) and a daughter Catherine "Kitty" Elizabeth Low (1850–1923[?]). Low also married a local Malay woman named Siti Hawa. The marriage ended with the death of Catherine from fever in Labuan on 1851. Low buried her and 14 other fever victims at night in his garden of new Government House (known to locals as Bumbung 12, Malay: "twelve roofs") which he designed, due to fear of the potential headhunting by the Dayaks ransacking of graves as they had earlier done at the Christian cemetery. The children were taken care of by their grandfather and uncle.

In Labuan, Low acquired administrative experience, fluency in Malay and an enduring reputation as a naturalist, and while there would set up various gardens, tame many animals and buy a plantation. During this time, he quarreled with both geologist/naturalist James Motley, and his daughter Kitty's husband Sir John Pope-Hennessey, the Governor of Labuan; the latter's unfavorable reports on him would have risked ending his chances for further advancement, had he not become known to the Colonial Office as being particularly talented. He was Police Magistrate from 1850 to 1877. It was also from Labuan he made his three visits to Mount Kinabalu, the first in March 1851 and twice with Spenser St. John, the consul General of Brunei, in 1858.

== Perak ==
In April 1877, Low was transferred to the Malay Peninsula and became the fourth Resident of Perak. By the terms of the Pangkor Treaty, the Resident was an adviser whose decision were binding in all matters except for custom or religion. The first Resident, J. W. W. Birch, had been murdered in 1874 over his excessively heavy handed approach, precipitating a war that left nearly all high-ranking Malay officials either dead or in exile. The second meanwhile, had quit over poor pay and disagreements with the governor. Feeling that Perak deserved better and getting increasingly frustrated by the apparent sacrifice of quality for proximity, the Colonial Office would subsequently select Low at the suggestion of Robert Henry Meade, with him being highly regarded as a safe pair of hands. Low's appointment thus marked a return to civil authority.

The Sultan at the time was Raja Yusuf, a highly unpopular chief appointed solely because of his lack of complicity in the death of the previous Resident. As such, Low knew that a strong grip would be needed and that he must rule firmly through the chiefs, as should it be believed Low could not control Yusuf, there risked further unrest. Learning from the mistakes of the previous Residencies, the government would move his headquarters to Kuala Kangsar so as to remain in close proximity to the chiefs, and one of his first acts was to walk from Larut to Matang, conversing with locals so as to get a feel for his new parish. Finding many of the arrangements not to his satisfaction, he quickly ascertained that sound financial management would be the key to running the state effectively, and set about gathering information and cutting down on unnecessary outlays. His first court in Larut was received well however, with him explaining his intention remaining accessible and governing for their benefit, and promising employment for police and penghulus who deserved it.

Much of his focus was in managing the rulership of Yusuf - whilst no fool, the new Sultan seemed to care about little except for milking the role for all it was worth and venting his own spiteful views. His move to Kuala Kangsar meant that he was able to visit him much more frequently than Birch could to Abdullah, who had refused to even live in the same kampong, and the Raja would visit him almost every day, regardless of summons. Their long discussions would allow Low to get to know Yusuf well, giving him advice ranging from land policy to how to conduct himself around town. At various points he would also have to admonish both Yusuf and his deputy, Raja Idris, for issuing orders in his name, such as when they tried to legally mandate mosque attendance for Muslims. Gradually however, he was able to train them into more effective rulers.

Drawing upon the example Frank Swettenham had set as the previous Resident's assistant, Low would also work closely with local Malay leaders of the various areas of Perak, simultaneously compensating them for their loss of power whilst extending British administrative reach at little cost. Low thus made visiting and consulting the various chiefs an immediate priority, and found that whilst all were polite, the differing levels of exposure to Europeans led to significant variation in outlook, with more urban areas generally being more favorable to the British. Low would subsequently provide small subsidies to many chiefs and headmen as a means both of bringing them closer to the government and of studying their own suitability for their role. He recognised however that this was a delicate process heavily dependent on his own judgement, and was always conscious of the risk of "being made a tool of".

In his first year, he laid down the principle that in order to retain their right to the mining land that they owned, owners of mining land were obliged to see that their land was worked. Within eight years, he saw slavery abolished in the state. In 1885 he established the first railway line in the Malay Peninsula from Taiping to Port Weld (now Kuala Sepetang). He also helped set up the Journal of the Straits Branch of the Royal Asiatic Society.

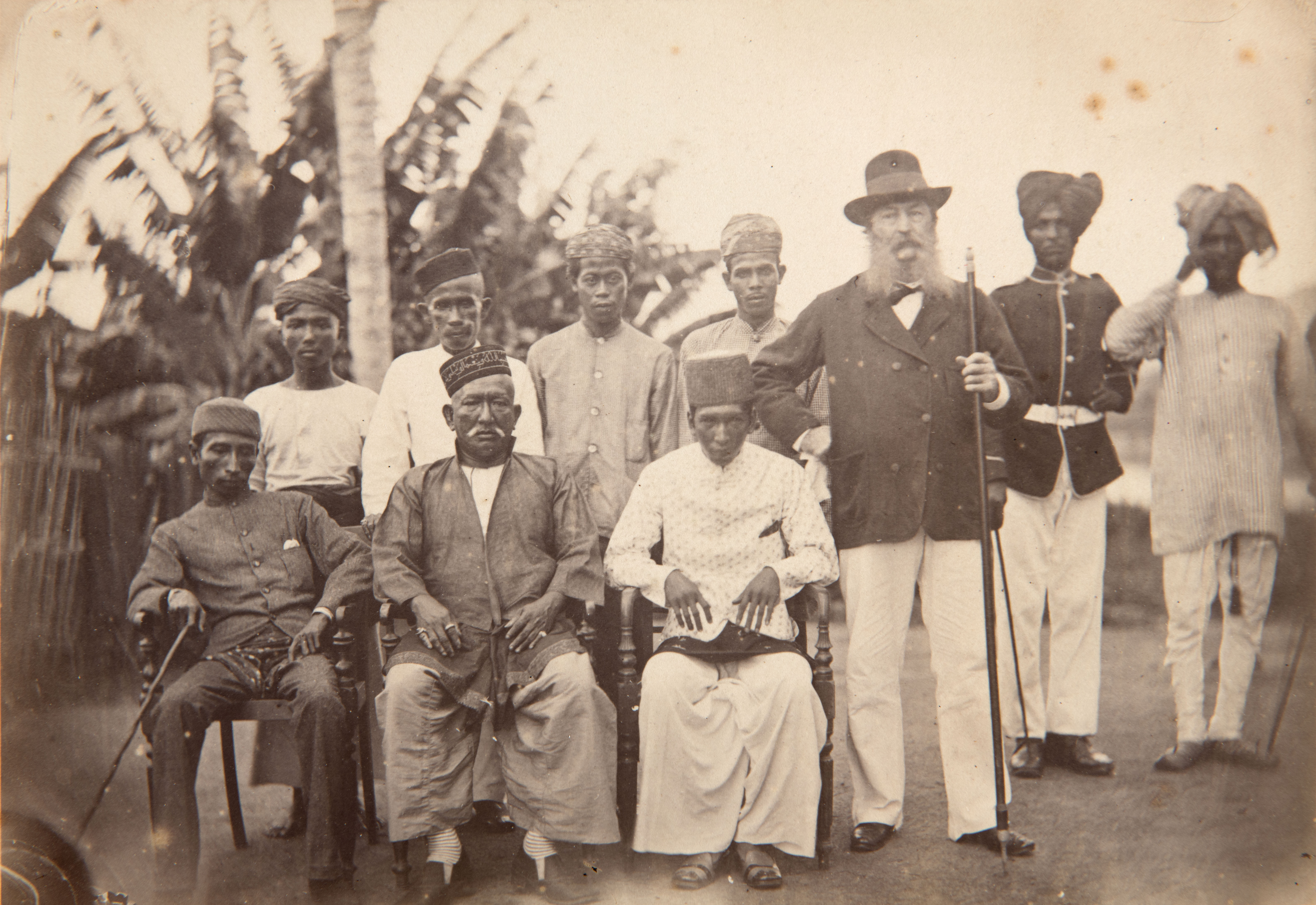
Group portrait with Hugh Low, the British resident of Perak, and two Malaysian rajas, local administrators in Perak and Larut, 1880 or 1881.

In his 12 years in Perak, Low firmly established a peaceful administration. He created a state council that included the principal Malay, Chinese and British leaders and was notably successful in making use of prominent local leaders at most levels of his administration. For example, he cultivated the friendship of mining magnate Kapitan China Chung Keng Quee who was his confidant. Other Chinese miners in Perak were persuaded to use modern British mining equipment by first having Ah Quee experiment with them. So close was this relationship that when Ah Quee was criticized in an article published in Harper's Magazine in 1891, Sir Hugh wrote a letter to the editor to set the record straight. He also worked closely with Raja Yusef (the Raja Muda) and Raja Dris (later Sultan Idris) to restore order, pay off the state's debt of 800,000 Straits Dollars, and re-establish confidence in the British Residential system.

During his time there was a controversy between James Innes, British magistrate in Selangor, and Sir Hugh Low, Resident of Perak, over the issue of debt-slavery in Malaya. Innes attempted to implicate Low, accusing him of abetting the practice of slavery in Perak when he was actually trying to abolish it.

Apart from his administrative achievements, Low was also involved in the experimental planting and research on commercial tropical crops including rubber, coffee, black pepper and tea. Rubber cultivation in Malaysia began with Sir Hugh Low. In 1882 he planted rubber seeds and grew seven trees at the gardens at Kuala Kangsar. Low created a model rubber plantation in Malaya although this is sometimes mis-attributed to Henry Ridley who continued the work after a decade. Low also collected specimens of plants and butterflies from the region.

On 1 August 1885, Sir Hugh Low married Ann Penelope Harriet Douglas, daughter of General Sir Robert Percy Douglas, 4th Baronet and Anne Duckworth.

== Retirement ==
Sir Hugh Low retired from his post as Resident of Perak in 1889, leaving a credit balance of 1.5 million Straits dollars.

Low died on 18 April 1905 in Alassio, Italy.

== Honours ==
- United Kingdom :
  - Companion of the Order of St Michael and St George (CMG) (1879)
  - Knight Commander of the Order of St Michael and St George (KCMG) - Sir (1883)
  - Knight Grand Cross of the Order of St Michael and St George (GCMG) - Sir (1889)

Several species are named to commemorate his work as collector, naturalist and orchidologist:

Plants

- Rhododendron lowii, Rhododendron
- Nepenthes lowii, pitcher plant
- Vatica lowii
- Myristica lowiana

Orchids

- Dimorphorchis lowii, Dimorphorchis (originally Vanda, then Arachnis)
- Dendrobium lowii, Dendrobium
- Paphiopedilum lowii, lady's slipper
- Plocoglottis lowii, Plocoglottis
- Malaxis lowii, Malaxis
- Phalaenopsis lowii

Insects

- Sarothrocera lowii, a beetle
- Neorina lowii, a butterfly
- Papilio lowi, a butterfly

Reptiles

- Calamaria lovii, a snake

Mammals

- Ptilocercus lowii, pen-tailed treeshrew
- Sundasciurus lowii, Low's squirrel

and places:

- Low's Peak, the highest peak of Southeast Asia, on Mount Kinabalu, Borneo
- Low's Gully
- Hugh Low Street, at Ipoh, Perak, Malaysia. The street name has changed to Jalan Sultan Iskandar, but locals still call it Hugh Low Street. It was once a busy two-way street, but since the name change and turning into a one-way street, the street has lost its glamour. There was once an arch; this was removed in 1986 when Hugh Low Street turned into a one-way street.

== Books by Hugh Low ==
- Sarawak, Its Inhabitants and Productions: Being Notes During a Residence in that Country with His Excellency Mr. Brooke By Hugh Low (1848)
- A Botanist in Borneo: Hugh Low's Sarawak Journals, 1844-1846 By Hugh Low, Bob Reece, Phillip Cribb Contributor Bob Reece, Phillip Cribb Published by Natural History Publications (Borneo), 2002; ISBN 983-812-065-0, ISBN 978-983-812-065-4
- Sĕlĕsǐlah (book of the Descent) of the Rajas of Brunei By Hugh Low Published by [s.n.], 1880
- The Journal of Sir Hugh Low; Perak, 1887: Perak, 1887 By Hugh Low, transcribed and edited by Emily Sadka Published by Govt. Print. Off., 1955

== Papers about Hugh Low ==
- Sir Hugh Low, G.C.M.G (1824-1905) by Charles F. Cowan in J.Soc.Biblphy.nat.Hist. v.4 pp. 327–343 (1968)

== Sources and notes ==
Political offices
Preceded by James G. Davidson	British Resident of Perak; 1877 – 1889	Succeeded by Frank A. Swettenham
