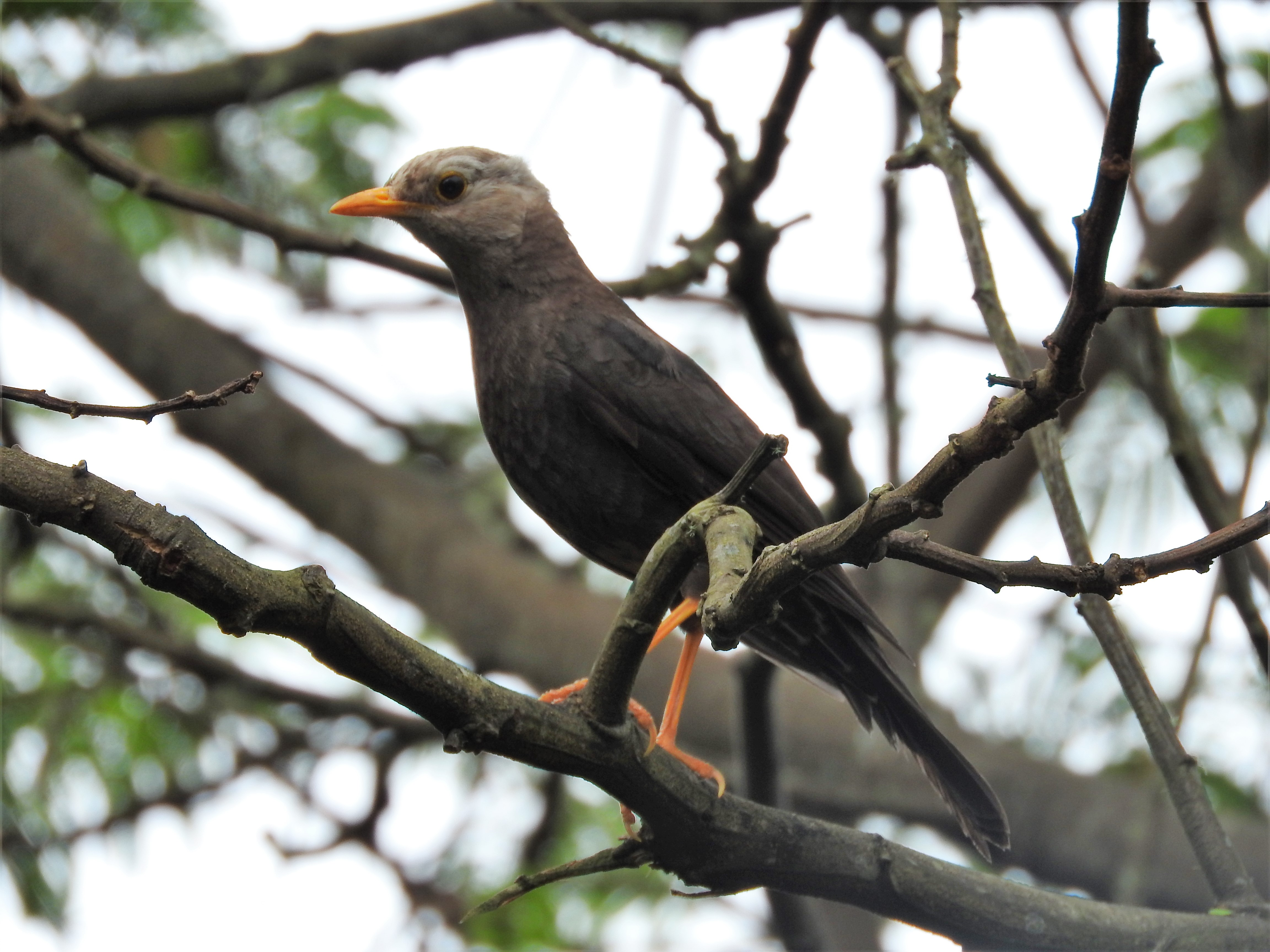
- Adult male T. j. javanicus, Gurung Merapi, central Java

Scientific classification
- Kingdom: Animalia
- Phylum: Chordata
- Class: Aves
- Order: Passeriformes
- Family: Turdidae
- Genus: Turdus
- Species: T. javanicus

Binomial name
- Turdus javanicus Horsfield, 1821

= Sundaic island thrush =

Species of bird

The Sundaic island thrush (Turdus javanicus), also known as the Sunda island thrush, is a species of passerine in the family Turdidae. It is found in Indonesia and Malaysia. Prior to 2024, the Sundaic island thrush was considered to be eight separate subspecies of the island thrush. It has the largest distribution in the island thrush complex, ranging from northern Sumatra south to Java, with a disjunct population in northern Borneo.

== Taxonomy ==
The Sundaic island thrush's nominate subspecies, T. j. javanicus was first described in 1821 by American naturalist Thomas Horsfield as Turdus javanicus. It was later considered to be a subspecies of Island thrush. In 2024, following a phylogenic study of Island thrush subspecies in 2023, the Island thrush was split into 17 different species by the IOC and Clements checklist.

It currently has seven accepted subspecies:

- Turdus javanicus fumidus Müller, 1844 - Found in West Java in the Mount Gede and Mount Papandayan regions (syn. T. j. biesenbachi Stresemann, 1930)
- Turdus javanicus indrapurae Robinson & Kloss, 1916 - Found in Southwest Sumatra
- Turdus javanicus javanicus Horsfield, 1821 - Found in Central Java
- Turdus javanicus loeseri Meyer de Schauensee, 1939 - Found in Northern Sumatra
- Turdus javanicus seebohmi (Sharpe, 1888) - Found in Northern Borneo
- Turdus javanicus stresemanni Bartels, 1938 - Found in West Java in the Mount Lawu region
- Turdus javanicus whiteheadi (Seebohm, 1893) - Found in East Java

== Description ==
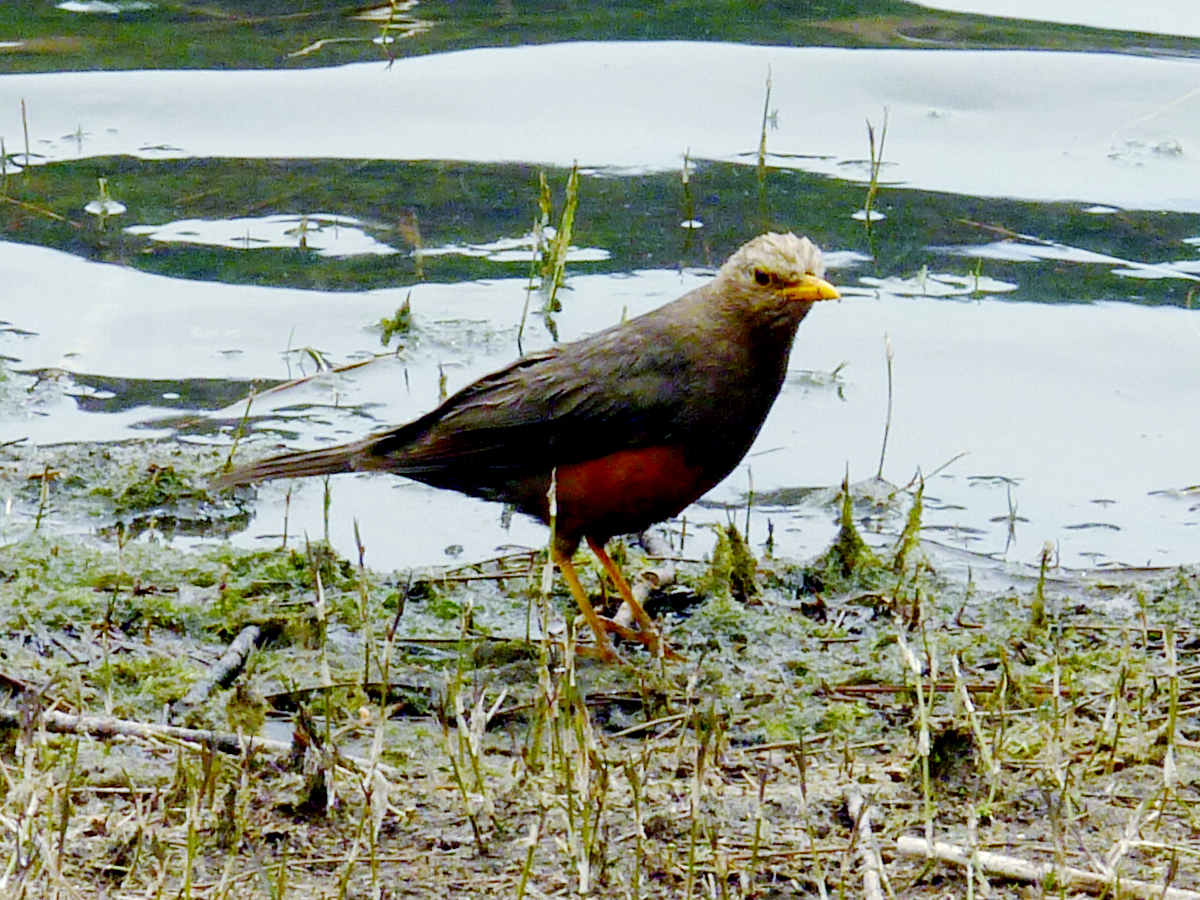
Turdus javanicus whiteheadi, Ranu Kumbolo, eastern Java

The Sundaic island thrush is a medium-sized thrush 21.5–25.5 cm long, with no difference in plumage between the males and females. The legs, feet and bill are yellow to orange-yellow. The nominate subspecies is dull brown all over except for a paler, greyer head. Several of the other subspecies, including T. j. fumidus, T. j. indrapurae, T. j. seebohmi and T. j. whiteheadi, differ in having a distinct orange tone on the belly, but are otherwise similar; T. j. stresemanni is darker reddish on the belly and also on its wings. T. j. loeseri is darker than the other subspecies, blackish or very dark brown. There is also some variation in size, with nominate T. j. javanicus the smallest at 21.5–23 cm, and T. j. seebohmi the largest at 24–25.5 cm.
