= Mount Kinabalu =

Highest mountain in Malaysia

- Mount St. Pierre / St. Pedro
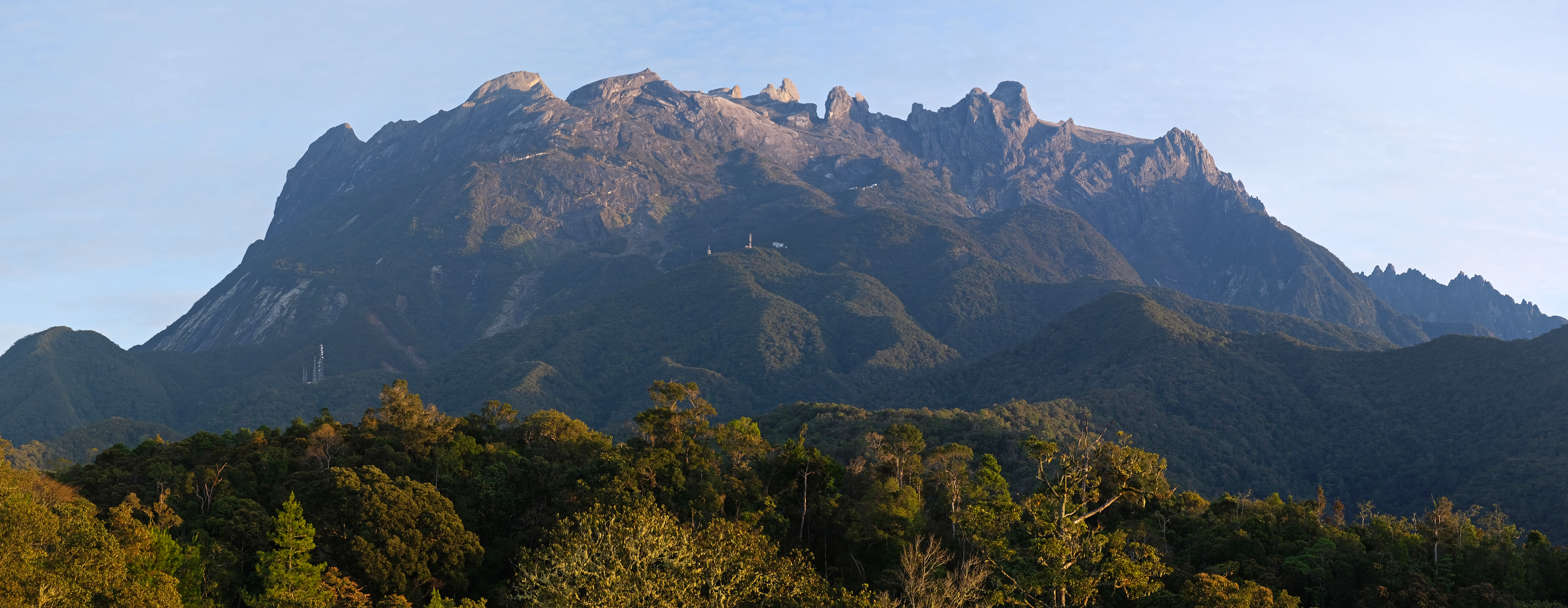

Highest point
- Elevation: 4,095 m (13,435 ft)
- Prominence: 4,095 m (13,435 ft); Ranked 20th
- Isolation: 2,513 km (1,562 mi)
- Listing: Country high point Island high point Ultra
- Coordinates: 06°04′30″N 116°33′31″E

Naming
- Native name: Gayo Ngaran (Kadazan Dusun); Nulu Nabalu (Kadazan Dusun); Gunung Kinabalu (Malay)

Geography
- Location within Malaysia
- Location: Ranau, West Coast Division, Sabah, Malaysia
- Parent range: Crocker Mountains

Climbing
- First ascent: March 1851; Hugh Low (summit plateau); 1888; John Whitehead (highest peak)
- Easiest route: Hiking

Mount Kinabalu (Dusun: Gayo Ngaran or Nulu Nabalu, Malay: Gunung Kinabalu) is the highest mountain in Malaysia and Maritime Southeast Asia, located on the island of Borneo in Sabah. With a height of 4,095 metres (13,435 ft), it is the third-highest peak of an island on Earth, the 28th-highest peak in Southeast Asia, and 20th-most-prominent mountain in the world. The mountain is located in Ranau district, West Coast Division of Sabah, Malaysia. It is protected as Kinabalu Park, a World Heritage Site.

In 1997, a re-survey using satellite technology was conducted. It established Mount Kinabalu had a summit (known as Low's Peak) height of 4,095 m (13,435 ft) above sea level, some 6 m (20 ft) less than the hitherto-published figure of 4,101 m (13,455 ft).

The mountain and its surroundings have high biodiversity, with 5,000 to 6,000 species of plants, 326 species of birds, and over 100 mammalian species identified. Among this rich collection of wildlife are famous species such as the Rafflesia plants and orangutans.

Low's Peak can be climbed by a person in good physical condition without mountaineering equipment on the main route. However, climbers must be accompanied by accredited guides at all times due to national park regulations and the risk of experiencing altitude sickness.

== Geology ==
Mount Kinabalu is a massive pluton formed from granodiorite that intruded into sedimentary and ultrabasic rocks, and forms the central part, or core, of the Kinabalu massif. The granodiorite is intrusive into strongly folded strata, probably of Eocene to Miocene age, and associated ultrabasic and basic igneous rocks. It was pushed up from the Earth's crust as molten rock millions of years ago. In geological terms, it is a very young mountain, as the granodiorite cooled and hardened only about 10 million years ago.

The present landform is considered to be a mid-Pliocene peneplain, arched and deeply dissected, through which the Kinabalu granodiorite body has risen in isostatic adjustment. It is still gaining roughly 5 mm (0.20 in) of height per year.

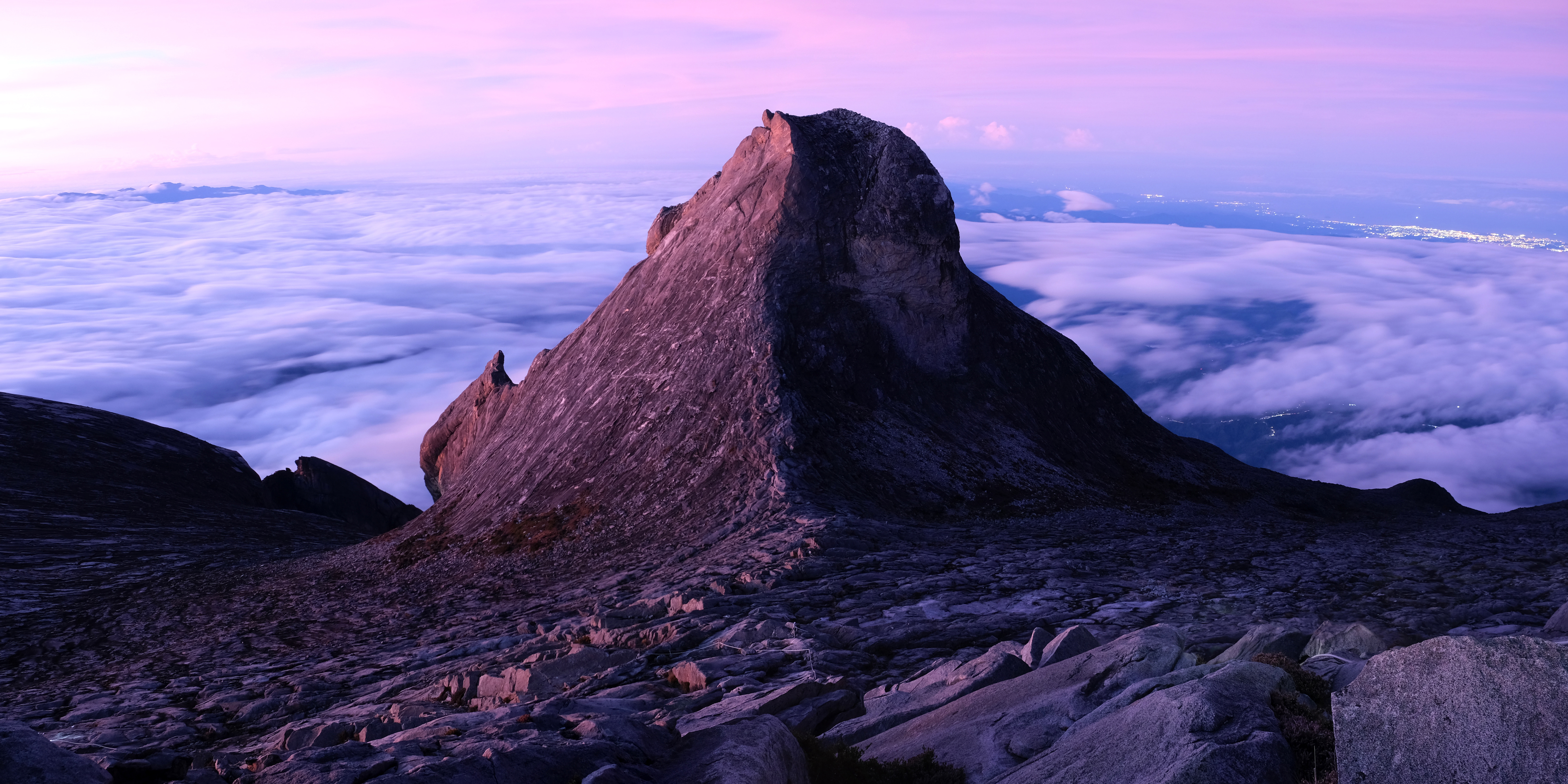
St. John's Peak seen from Low's Peak during sunrise. Kota Kinabalu city lights seen on the far right.

During the Pleistocene Epoch of about 100,000 years ago, the mountain was covered by sheets of ice and glaciers. As these glaciers flowed down its slopes, they scoured the surface of Mount Kinabalu in the process and creating the 1,800-metre-deep (5,900 ft) Low's Gully (named after Hugh Low) on its north side. Its granitic composition and the glacial formative processes are readily apparent when viewing its craggy, rocky peaks.

=== IUGS geological heritage site ===
Because it is "one of the youngest granitic intrusions exposed on Earth and the site of spectacular tropical glacial landscapes", the International Union of Geological Sciences (IUGS) included the Mount Kinabalu Neogene granite in its assemblage of 100 geological heritage sites around the world in a listing published in October 2022. The organisation defines an IUGS Geological Heritage Site as "a key place with geological elements and/or processes of international scientific relevance, used as a reference, and/or with a substantial contribution to the development of geological sciences through history."

== Climate ==
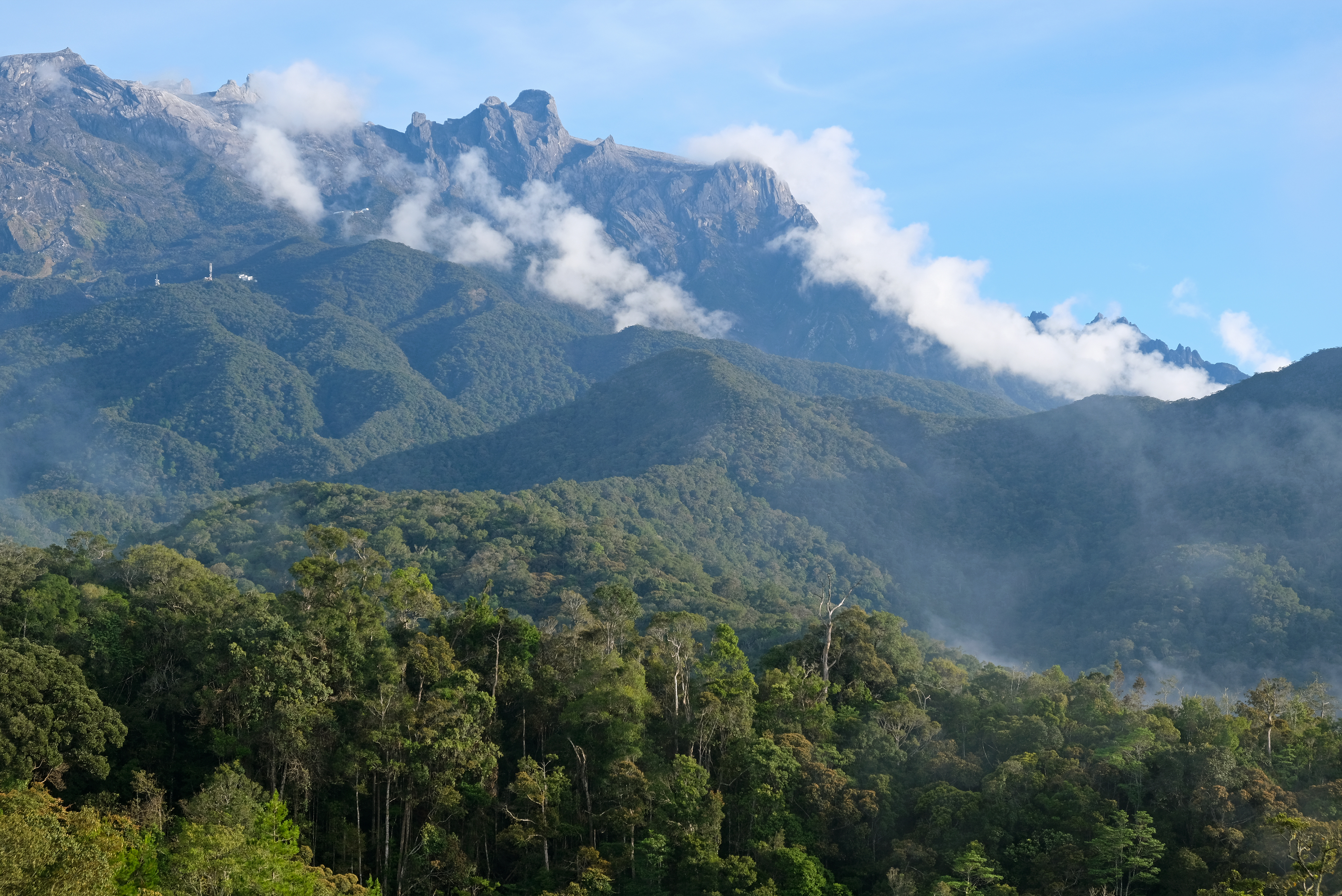
Rainforest mist on the slopes of the mountain.

The climate of the mountain varies from humid tropical at its base to alpine at its summit. The temperature at the summit of Mount Kinabalu ranges from −4 to 8 °C (25 to 46 °F) from December to January, and 3 to 12 °C (37 to 54 °F) from June to September. Depending on how cold the mountain remains from December to January, there are a few occasions where frost and ice appear at the summit. Snow has been recorded three times in this area, in 1975, 1993, and 2022.

== Biology ==
Mount Kinabalu, along with other upland areas of the Crocker Mountains, is known worldwide for its biodiversity with plants of Himalayan, Australasian, and Indomalayan origin. A recent botanical survey of the mountain estimated a staggering 5,000 to 6,000 plant species (excluding mosses and liverwort but including ferns) thrive upon the mountain. It is therefore one of the world's most important biological sites. A reason for its rich diversity and endemisms is that its extreme height provides refuge to cold-adapted species during interglacials.

In 2015, a major Malaysian–Dutch study showed that the unique flora, fauna, and fungi on the mountain summit are younger than the mountain itself, and have evolved from both local and distant montane ancestors.

=== Flora ===
The flora of the mountain varies with elevation and geology. Lowland forest extends up to about 1,500 metres (4,900 ft) elevation, and consists of two main types, based on the dominant tree species – mixed dipterocarp forest and mixed Casuarina forest. Lowland forests generally have a closed canopy 40 metres (130 ft), along with an understory stratum of lower trees, and an emergent stratum of taller trees which extend above the canopy.

Montane rain forest, also known as cloud forest, extends from approximately 1,400 to 2,900 metres (4,600 to 9,500 ft). Montane forest typically has a closed canopy with single stratum, and the canopy height generally decreases with elevation. Typical trees include species of the plant families Fagaceae and Lauraceae, with conifers increasingly abundant at higher elevations. The lower montane forests have a high diversity of orchid and fern species. Carnivorous plants, including species of Nepenthes, Drosera, and Utricularia, are most diverse between 2,200 and 2,550 metres (7,220 and 8,370 ft) elevation, in areas with high rainfall and a stunted, open tree canopy. The montane forests are interspersed with areas of graminoid scrub, generally associated with hypermagnesic cambisol soils.

Sub-alpine scrub extends from 2,600 to 3,200 metres (8,500 to 10,500 ft). It includes short trees and shrubs such the conifer Dacrydium gibbsiae, Leptospermum recurvum, and species from the plant families Myrtaceae and Ericaceae, along with dwarf shrubs, mosses, lichens, liverworts, and ferns. Orchids are abundant and diverse in subalpine and alpine plant communities, except at the highest summits. Above 3,500 meters, conditions are too extreme for trees, and above 3,700 meters, persistent ground frost limits plants to the hardiest grasses, sedges, and dwarf shrubs, including Leptospermum recurvatum and Rhododendron ericoides, which grow in crevices and other sheltered areas on the rocky summits.

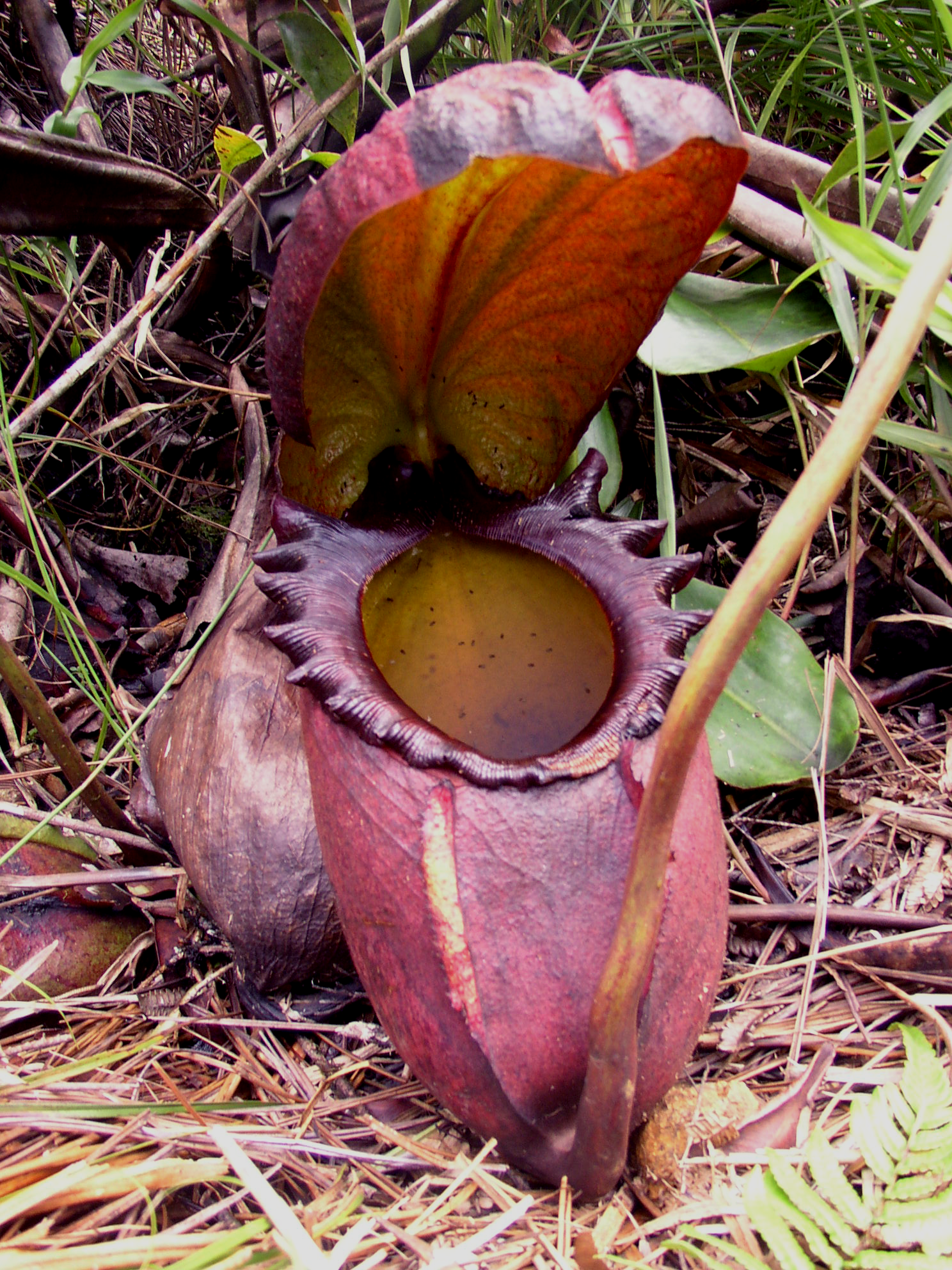
Large lower pitcher of Nepenthes rajah

The plants of Mount Kinabalu have high levels of biodiversity and endemism (i.e. species which are found only within Kinabalu Park and are not found anywhere else in the world). Orchids are the best-known example, with 866 species in 134 genera, including species of Bulbophyllum, Dendrobium, Coelogyne, Liparis, and Calanthe, and some of the highly valued Paphiopedilum slipper orchids. There are also over 600 species of ferns (more than the whole of Africa's 500 species), of which 50 are found nowhere else. Mount Kinabalu has the richest collection in the world of Nepenthes pitcher plants (five of the thirteen are found nowhere else on earth), some of which reach spectacular proportions (the largest-pitchered in the world being the endemic Nepenthes rajah). The parasitic Rafflesia plant, which has the largest single flower in the world, is also found in Kinabalu (particularly Rafflesia keithii whose flower grows to 94 cm (37 in) in diameter), though blooms of the flower are rare and difficult to find. Meanwhile, another Rafflesia species, Rafflesia tengku-adlinii, can be found on the neighbouring Mount Trus Madi and the nearby Maliau Basin.

Mount Kinabalu's above-average biodiversity in plant life is due to a combination of several unique factors: its setting in one of the richest plant regions of the world (the tropical biogeographical region known as western Malesia which comprises the island of Sumatra, the Malay Peninsula, and the island of Borneo), the fact that the mountain covers a wide climatic range from near sea level to freezing ground conditions near the summit, the jagged terrain and diversity of rocks and soils, the high levels of rainfall (averaging about 2,700 mm (110 in) a year at park headquarters), and the climatic instability caused by periods of glaciation and catastrophic droughts which result in evolution and speciation. This diversity is greatest in the lowland regions (consisting of lowland dipterocarp forests, so called because the tree family Dipterocarpaceae are dominant). However, most of Kinabalu's endemic species are found in the mountain forests, particularly on ultramafic soils.

The ultramafic rocks which make up parts of the mountain create soils rich in certain metallic elements (nickel, cobalt, chromium, and manganese), high cation imbalances (high Mg:Ca molar quotients), and deficiencies of some nutrients including potassium and phosphorus. These soil conditions affect the plant life, and plant communities on ultramafic soils show lower stature and lower biomass, higher levels of endemism, and a distinct species composition compared to plant communities at similar elevations elsewhere on the mountain.

=== Fauna ===
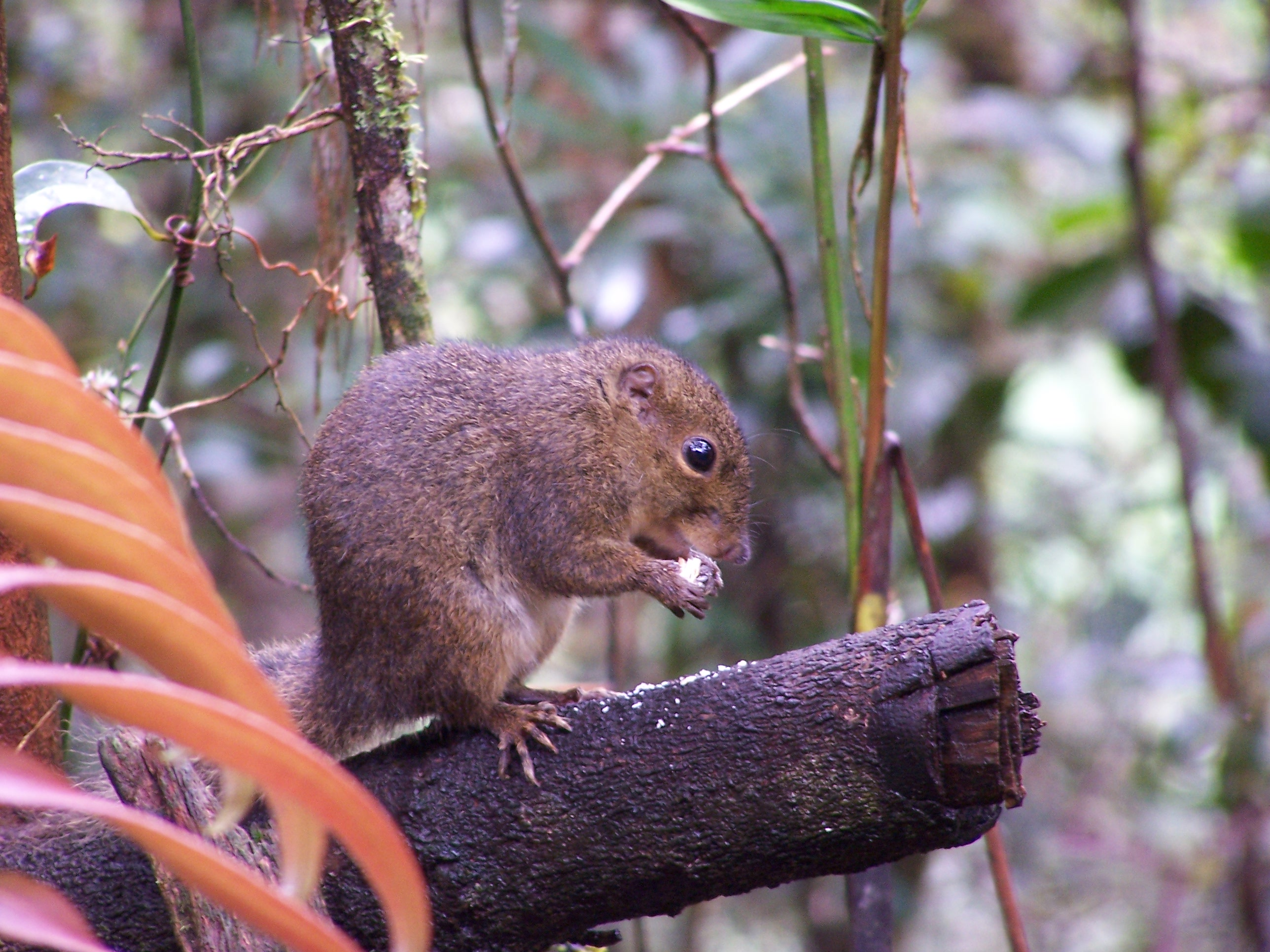
A mountain squirrel, Sundasciurus tenuis, from Mount Kinabalu

The variety of plant life is also habitat for a great variety of birds and mammals. There are some 326 species of birds in Kinabalu Park, including the spectacular rhinoceros hornbill, mountain serpent-eagle, Dulit frogmouth, eyebrowed jungle flycatcher, and bare-headed laughingthrush. Twenty-four birds are mainly found on the mountain. Four species – the Borneo thrush (Turdus poliocephalus seebohmi), mountain blackeye (Zosterops emiliae), friendly bush warbler (Locustella accentor), and aberrant bush warbler (Horornis flavolivaceus) – are native to the subalpine zone.

The mountain is home to some 100 mammalian species mostly living high in the trees, including one of the great apes, the Bornean orangutan (though sightings of these are uncommon; estimates of its numbers in the park range from 25 to 120). Other mammals include three kinds of deer, the Malayan weasel (Mustela nudipes), Oriental small-clawed otter (Aonyx cinerea), and leopard cat (Prionailurus bengalensis). Endemic mammals include the black shrew (Suncus ater). However, others of its endemics, such as the Bornean ferret-badger (Melogale everetti) and Rattus baluensis, have also recently been recorded in the nearby Mount Tambuyukon.

Endemic annelids number less than a dozen known species but include the Kinabalu giant red leech that preys on various earthworms, including the Kinabalu giant earthworm. In the summit zone, at least 26 endemic species of land snail exist. In 2012, a major scientific expedition, jointly organised by the Malaysian Sabah Parks and the Dutch Naturalis Biodiversity Center, performed DNA analysis of several dozen endemic flora, fauna, and fungi, to understand the evolutionary origin of the unique biodiversity of Kinabalu.

=== Threats and preservation ===
The steep mountainsides with poor soil are not suitable for farming or for the timber industry, so the habitats and animal life of Kinabalu remain largely intact, with about a third of the original habitat now degraded. Kinabalu Park was established in 1964, and the nearby mountains were protected as the Crocker Range National Park in 1984. However, even national-park status does not guarantee full protection, as logging permits were granted on Trus Madi in 1984.

== History ==
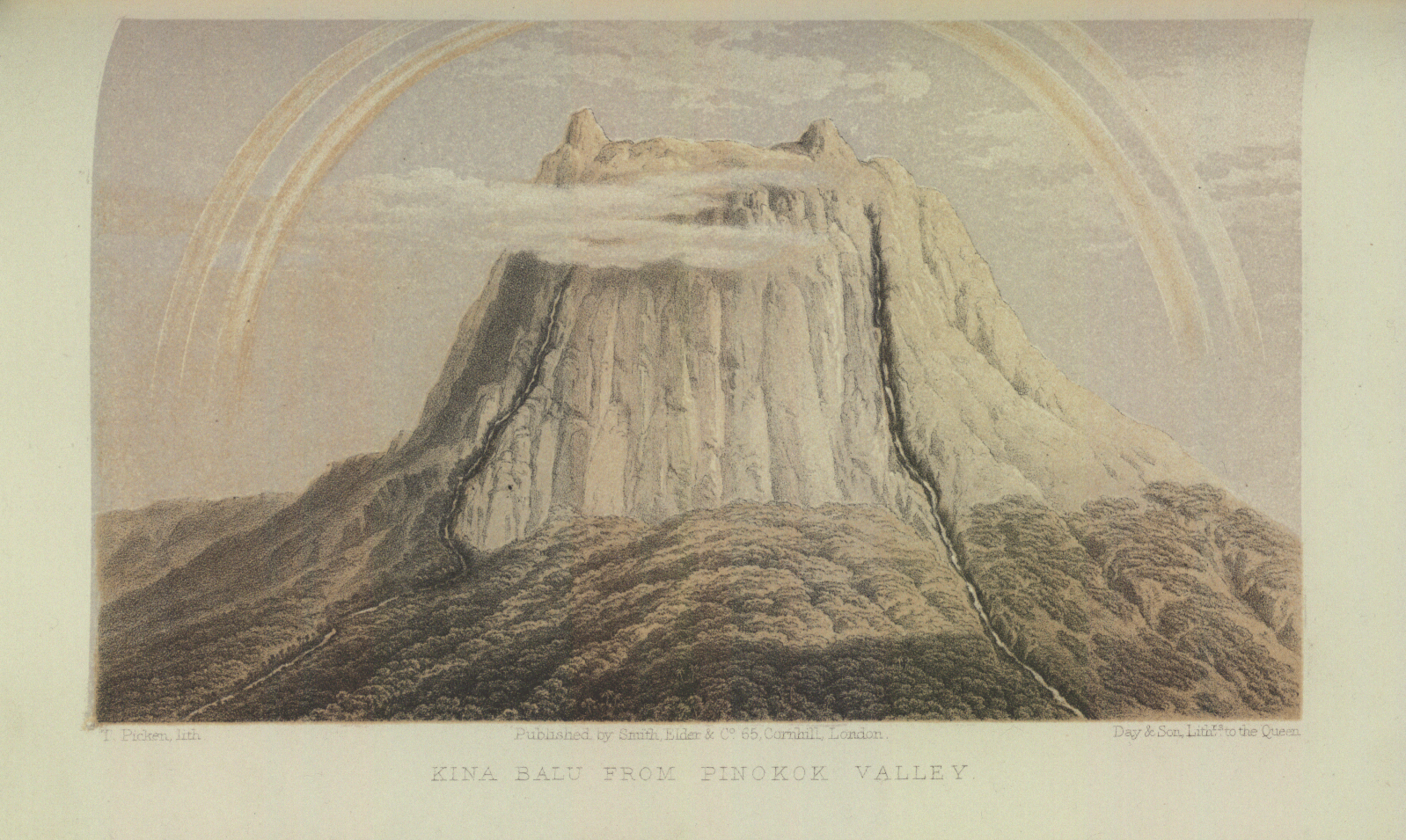
"Kina Balu from Pinokok Valley" – lithograph published in 1862

British colonial administrator Hugh Low made the first recorded ascent of Mount Kinabalu's summit plateau in March 1851 with local Dusun guide Lemaing of Kampung Kiau. Low did not scale the mountain's highest peak, however, considering it "inaccessible to any but winged animals". In April and July 1858, Low was accompanied on two further ascents by Spenser St. John, the British Consul in Brunei. The highest point of Mount Kinabalu was finally reached in 1888 by zoologist John Whitehead. British botanist Lilian Gibbs became the first woman and the first botanist to summit Mount Kinabalu in February 1910.

Botanist E. J. H. Corner led two important expeditions of the Royal Society of Great Britain to the mountain in 1961 and 1964. Kinabalu National Park was established in 1964. The park was designated a natural World Heritage Site in 2000.

=== 2015 earthquake ===
On 5 June 2015 at 07:15 MST, the area around Mount Kinabalu was damaged by an earthquake. Eighteen people, including hikers and mountain guides, were killed by the earthquake and a massive landslide that followed it. Ranau and many parts of Sabah West Coast were affected and Donkey Ear's Peak was heavily damaged.

Six days before the earthquake, a group of ten western tourists (comprising six men and four women from Canada, Germany, Netherlands, and the United Kingdom) had stripped naked and urinated while on the mountain's summit. Local people were deeply offended, and many who considered Kinabalu to be a sacred place believed that the act had angered the mountain spirits. Four of the group were convicted on charges of public indecency, and sentenced to three days in jail and a fine of 5,000 ringgit.

Following the incident, some of the tourists and their families expressed their apologies to all involved parties, and the government of the United Kingdom began to review its travel advice for Malaysia.

== Climbing the mountain ==
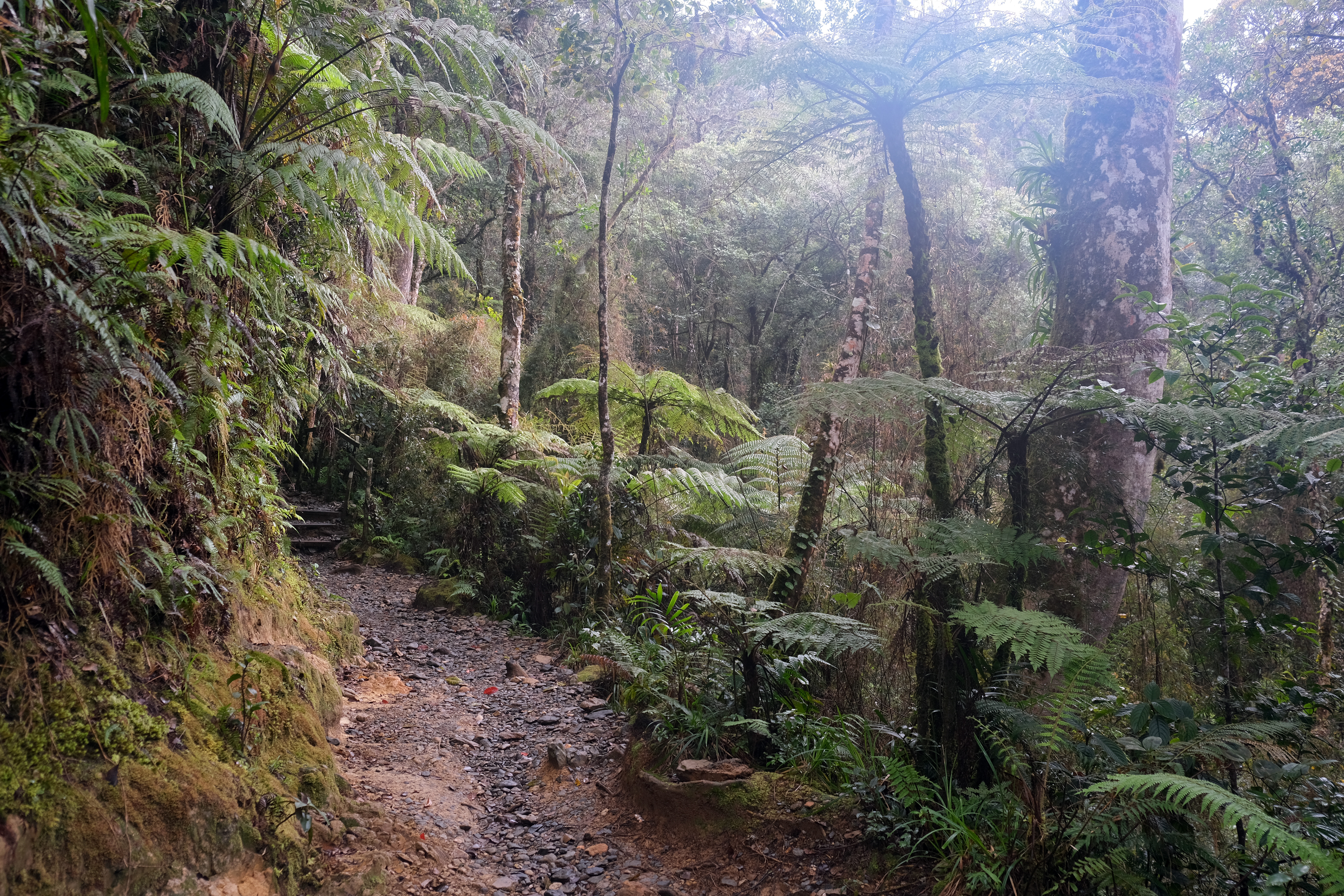
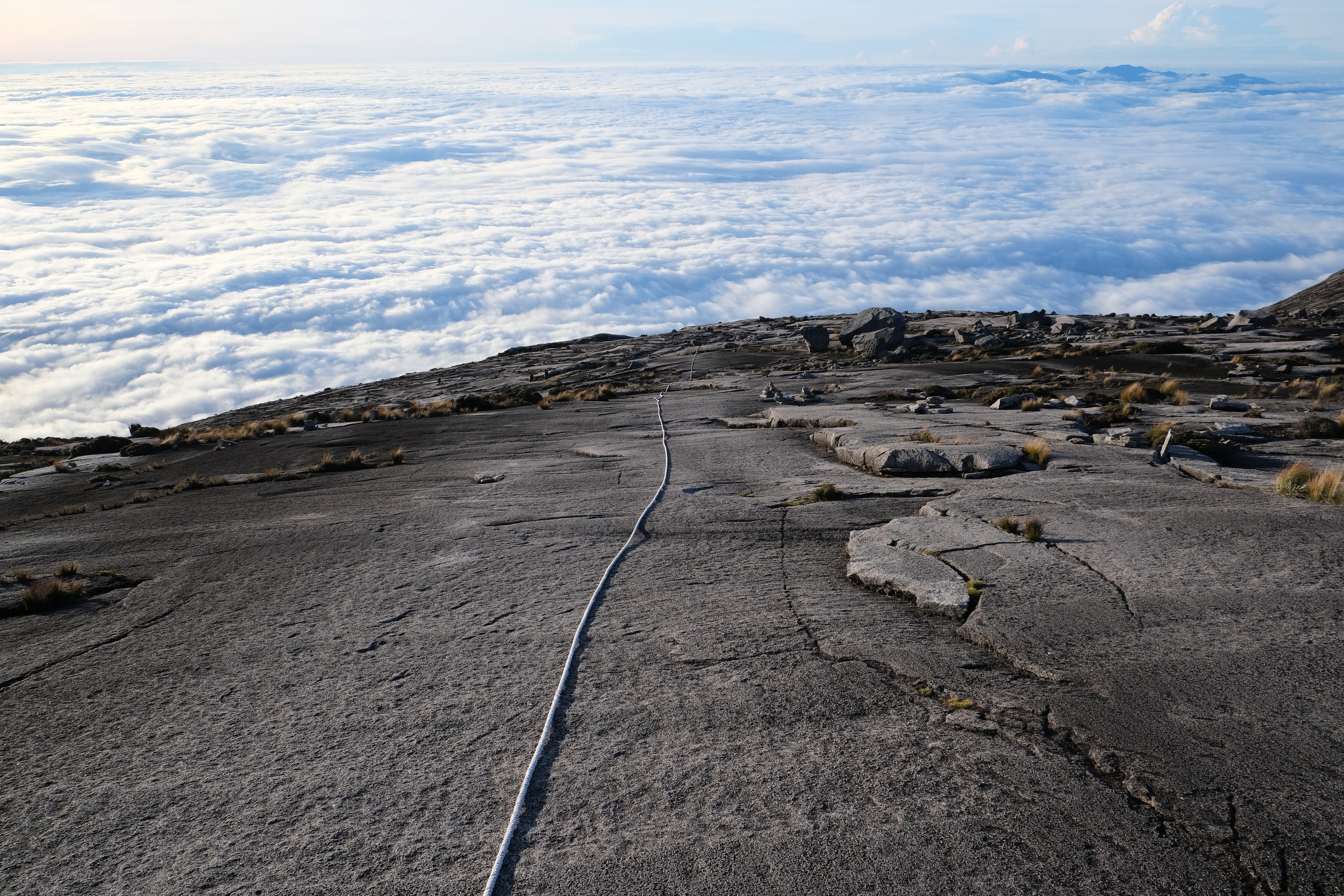
Mount Kinabalu climbing trail at lower elevations (left) and on the summit plateau (right)

Climbers must be accompanied by accredited guides at all times due to national park regulations. There are two main starting points for the climb: the Timpohon Gate (located 5.5 km (3.4 mi) from Kinabalu Park Headquarters, at an altitude of 1,866 m (6,122 ft)), and the Mesilau Nature Resort. The latter starting point is slightly higher in elevation, but crosses a ridge, adding about two kilometres to the ascent and making the total elevation gain slightly higher. The Mesilau Trail is no longer accessible due to the earthquake in 2015. The two trails meet about 2 km (1.2 mi) before Laban Rata.

Sabah Parks grants a summit-climbing permit only to climbers who stay at mountain huts. Due to the limited number of beds at the mountain huts, only 130 people are allowed to climb Mount Kinabalu per day.

Accommodation is available inside the park or outside near the headquarters. Sabah Parks has privatised Mount Kinabalu activities to an organisation called Sutera Sanctuary Lodges. The mountain may be climbed on a single day trip, or hikers may (usually) stay one night at Laban Rata Resthouse at 3,270 m (10,730 ft) to complete the climb in 2 days, finishing the ascent and descending on the second day. The majority of climbers begin the ascent on day one of a two-day hike from Timpohon gate at 1,866 m (6,122 ft), reaching this location either by minibus or by walking, and then walk to Laban Rata. Most people accomplish this part of the climb in 3 to 6 hours. Since there are no roads, the supplies for the Laban Rata Resthouse are carried by porters, who sometimes bring more than 35 kg (77 lb) of supplies on their backs. Hot food and beverages are available at Laban Rata. Most rooms have no hot water in the bathrooms and whilst the dining area is heated, most rooms are not. The last 2 km (6,600 ft), from the Laban Rata Resthouse at 3,270 m (10,730 ft) to Low's Peak (summit) at 4,095.2 m (13,436 ft), takes between 2 and 4 hours. The last part of the climb is on bare granite rock.

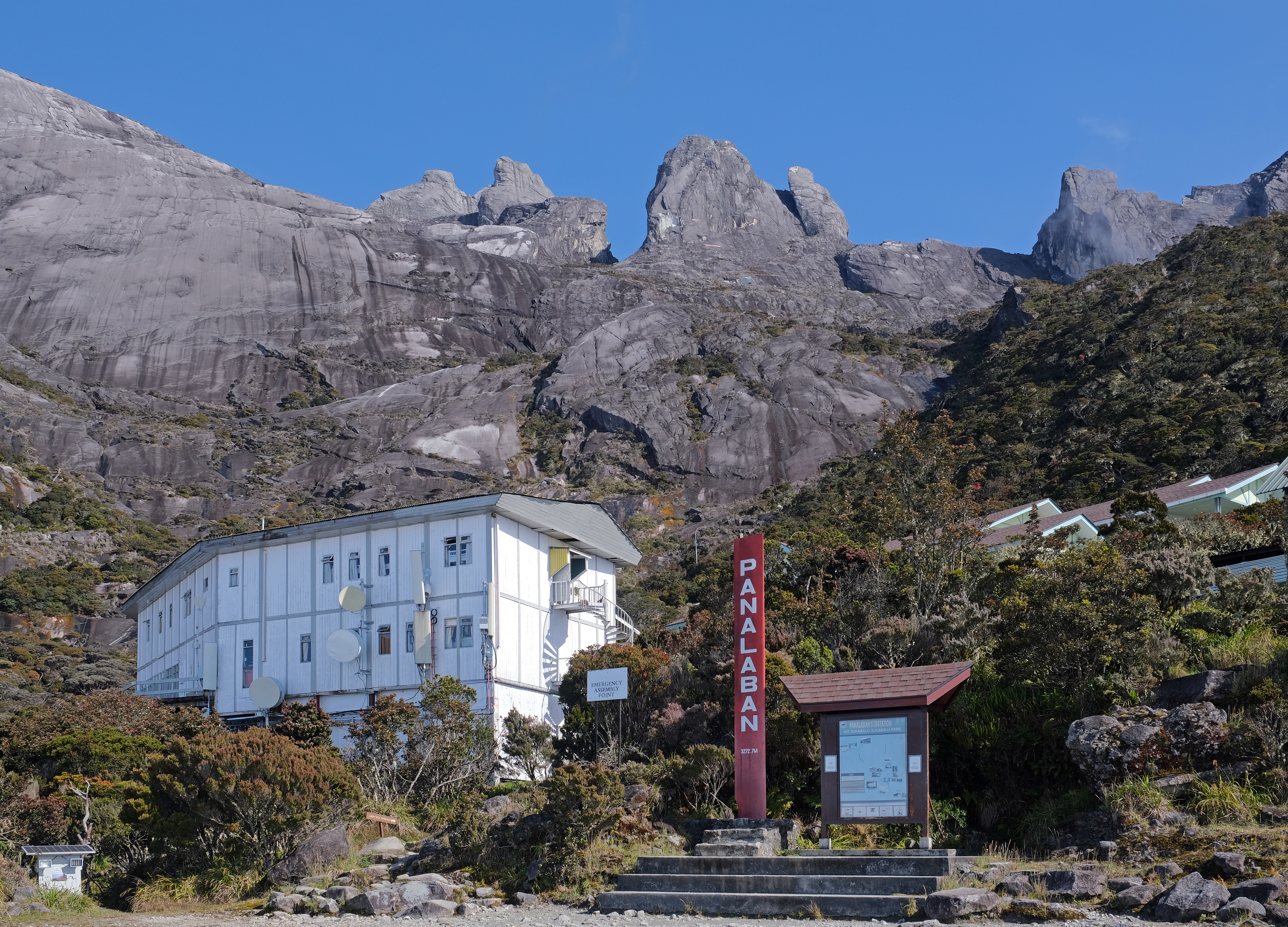
Laban Rata Resthouse at 3,270 m (10,730 ft)

Given the high altitude, some people may suffer from altitude sickness, although staying overnight at the lodges before the climb and climbing at a lower rate of ascent may reduce the likelihood of this happening.

The Mount Kinabalu Climbathon skyrunning competition has been held on the mountain since 1987. The competition went international in 1988.

=== Low's Gully ===
Low's Gully (named after Hugh Low who first looked down into it in 1851) is a 1,800-metre-deep (5,900 ft) gorge carved out by glaciation on the north side of Mount Kinabalu, which is exceptionally inhospitable due to its depth and high rainfall. In March 1994, two British Army officers were severely criticised after leading a party of 7 British and 3 Hong Kong soldiers in an attempt to abseil and climb down into the gully; extensive rescue efforts from both the RAF and the Malaysian army were required. The party were not equipped with radios, and the 2 officers and 3 Hong Kong soldiers were trapped for 16 days and did not eat for five days before being rescued when stretchers were lowered by helicopter. The breakaway party of five completed the first descent of the gully in three days. A book about the 31-day fight for survival entitled Descent into Chaos was published in 1996, and a film drama The Place of the Dead was released in 1997. The first successful complete descent of Low's Gully was achieved by a 27-strong joint Malaysian–British team led by mountaineer and former British Army officer Pat Gunson in 1998.

== Meaning of name ==
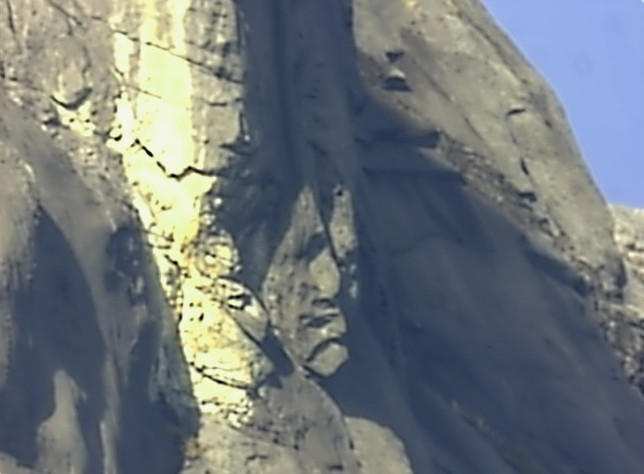
A visual illusion of a rock face on Mt. Kinabalu. Caught on camera from a location in Mesilau, December 2011.

There are several explanations for the mountain's name. The word Kinabalu is likely simply a clipping of Aki Nabalu (Grandfather Nabalu), the guardian spirit of the mountain. The Liwan tribe of the Kadazandusun people refer to the mountain by the name Gayo Ngaran (lit. "The Great Name") instead. Additionally, yearly pilgrimages taken by the Kadazandusun to the mountain is referred to as Kakakapan id Gayo Ngaran (lit. "Visiting the Great Name").

A disputed folk etymology that the name "Kinabalu" actually means "Cina Balu" (meaning "A Chinese Widow" in Malay). However, this folk story is debated, as it is interpreting the Kadazandusun phrase as if it were Malay. In Kadazandusun, Kina or Sina means 'Chinese', but 'widow' in Kadazandusun is nopuod, not balu; with the root puod being a verb meaning 'to become widowed'. An earlier book by Spenser St. John published in 1863 claimed that "Kina Balu" means "Chinese widow".

== See also ==
- Borneo lowland rain forest – ecoregion
- Borneo montane rain forests – ecoregion
- List of ultras of the Malay Archipelago
