= Semoga Bahagia =

Malay song

"Semoga Bahagia" is a Singaporean song composed by Zubir Said, who also composed "Majulah Singapura", the national anthem of Singapore. Sung in Malay, the song has been the official Children's Day song in Singapore since 1961, and is also performed at the Singapore Youth Festival (SYF) as its official theme song.

== History ==
"Semoga Bahagia" was composed by Zubir Said and targeted at students. It was first published and performed on 7 July 1957 at the Victoria Memorial Hall and was eventually broadcast in Singapore and Kuala Lumpur as well. On 23 September 1961, the song was chosen by the Ministry of Education to commemorate Children's Day. (Note: In his 1974 open letter, Zubir Said was unsure of the year the song was chosen and incorrectly stated 1960. The Straits Times reported on the Ministry of Education choosing the song in 1961.) All schools subsequently received a copy of the song, and music teachers were sent to Beatty Secondary School for rehearsals. The song was sung by students on 23 October 1961, the first commemoration of Children's Day in Singapore.

In 1974, Zubir was informed by one of his former students that the lyrics to "Semoga Bahagia" had been altered. Feeling that it should not have been edited without his consent, Zubir wrote an open letter to the New Nation newspaper on 25 August protesting the change, likening the act to "damaging the prestige of the original painter". He also noted that two melodic phrases had been changed and deleted, and the refrain (chorus) was entirely removed. His name had also been left out of the credits in the new songsheet and replaced with someone else's name. In an interview with Berita Harian, Zubir called for a law that would prevent such an act in the future, noting that there was no copyright for music and songs.

When contacted by New Nation, Charles Lazaroo from the Extra-curricular Activities Centre replied that teachers had provided feedback that non-Malay students were having trouble singing the song due to its "intricate melody", and had requested for the song be simplified. Lazaroo also stated that they had had difficulty contacting Zubir, believing he was ill. According to Zubir's daughter Rohana, the composer refused to accept the explanation as the song had been sung for many years by that point. A mediator assisted in reaching a compromise in which a repetitive verse was removed with Zubir's approval and the original lyrics reinstated, in time for the song to be taught to students that October.

=== Legacy ===
"Semoga Bahagia" is still sung annually on Children's Day in Singapore. It became the official theme song for the Singapore Youth Festival (SYF) and is also performed annually during the SYF.

== Symbolism ==
The Malay title "Semoga Bahagia" has been variously translated as "Let Glory be Yours", "Glory belongs to you", and "May You Achieve Happiness". In the open letter published in 1974, Zubir wrote that some of the lyrics were intended to urge children to be progressive, healthy, knowledgeable, patriotic and respectful, amongst other similar themes.

== Lyrics ==
Malay original	English translation
Sama-sama maju ke hadapan Pandai cari pelajaran Jaga diri dalam kesihatan Serta sopan santun dengan kawan-kawan Dengan hati bersih serta suci Sama-sama hormat dan berbudi Jaga tingkah pemuda-pemudi Adat dan budaya junjung tinggi Capailah lekas cita-cita pemudi-pemuda Supaya kita ada harga di mata dunia Kalau kita lengah serta lupa Hidup kita sia-sia Jiwa besar sihat serta segar Rajin dengan sabar tentu bahagia Lemah lembut perangai pemudi Cergas tangkas wataknya pemuda Sukarela selalu berbakti Sikap yang pembela dan berjasa Capailah nama yang mulia pemudi-pemuda Rajinlah supaya berjaya semoga bahagia	Together we advance forward Smart in seeking knowledge Take care of our health And be courteous with our friends With a clean and pure heart Respect and do good with one another Let us youths mind our manners And uphold our traditions and customs Reach for our ambitions, youths So the world will value us If we are lazy and forgetful Our lives will be worthless A good, healthy and refreshed soul With hard work and patience brings happiness Soft-spoken is the lady And energetic and agile is the man Volunteer and always serve A protective and meritorous attitude Attain a respectful image, oh youths Be hardworking and succeed: may you achieve happiness!
