= Orang Singapura =

Malay song

Orang Singapura (pronounced [o.raŋ si.ŋa.pu.ra]; "People of Singapore") is a Malay song written and composed by the Singaporean composer Zubir Said, known for composing Majulah Singapura, the national anthem of Singapore. The song lists the aspirational attributes of a Singaporean.

== History ==
The song was one of ten songs written by Zubir as part of a songbook released by the Singapore Malay Teachers' Union (SMTU) in September 1981, titled Lagu-lagu Kita ("Our Songs"). The songbook was created to provide original Malay-language children songs, as well as popularise unknown existing songs. These songs including Orang Singapura were subsequently recorded and released on cassette for Children's Day in 1982, performed by Sufiah Abdullah Fauzi, Latifah Ibrahim and Jamaliah Hussain.

Other notable performances of Orang Singapura include the 2001 National Day Parade, and the 2022 revue Don't Call Him Mr. Mari Kita.

== Lyrics ==
Malay

Kalau sudah jadi, orang Singapura,
Hati mahu baik, berbudi bahasa.
Mesti tahan lasak, kuat berusaha,
Cukup tatatertib, hormat orang tua.
Barulah orang segan, hormat dengan (Note: Changed from dengan (with) to pada (to) when performed on National Day Parade 2001.) kita,
Bolehlah dinamakan: orang Singapura.

Jikalau bekerja, janganlah kepalang,
Sanggup tanggungjawab, jangan curi tulang.
Taat dan setia, kepada negara,
Dan begitu pula, pada agama.
Begitu hidup kita, hidup sama-sama,
Barulah kita bangsa: orang Singapura.

IPA (Note: See Help:IPA/Malay.)

[ka.lau̯ su.dah d͡ʒa.di o.raŋ si.ŋa.pu.ra]
[ha.ti ma.hu ba.iʔ bər.bu.di ba.ha.sa]
[məs.ti ta.han la.saʔ ku.at bə.ru.sa.ha]
[t͡ʃu.kup ta.ta.tər.tib hor.mat pa.da tu.a]
[ba.ru.lah o.raŋ sə.gan hor.mat de.ŋan ki.ta]
[bo.leh.lah di.na.ma.kan o.raŋ si.ŋa.pu.ra]

[d͡ʒi.ka.lau̯ bə.kər.d͡ʒa d͡ʒa.ŋan.lah kə.pa.laŋ]
[saŋ.gup taŋ.guŋ.d͡ʒa.wab d͡ʒa.ŋan t͡ʃu.ri tu.laŋ]
[ta.ʔat dan sə.ti.a kə.pa.da nə.ga.ra]
[dan bə.gi.tu pu.la pa.da a.ga.ma]
[bə.gi.tu hi.dup ki.ta hi.dup sa.ma sa.ma]
[ba.ru.lah ki.ta baŋ.sa o.raŋ si.ŋa.pu.ra]

English translation

If you are born, a true Singaporean,
Your heart must be kind, filled with courtesy and grace.
You must be hardy and endure, and work hard,
With proper manners, respectful of elders.
Then others will be in awe, respectful of us,
Then we deserve the name: Singaporean.

When you work, don’t be half-hearted,
Be responsible, don’t shirk from duty.
Be loyal and faithful, to the country,
And also not forgetting, to one’s faith.
That is our life, living together,
Then only are we a nation: of true Singaporeans.
