= Kiki Tay =

Singaporean magician and comedian

Kiki Tay 郑俊杰
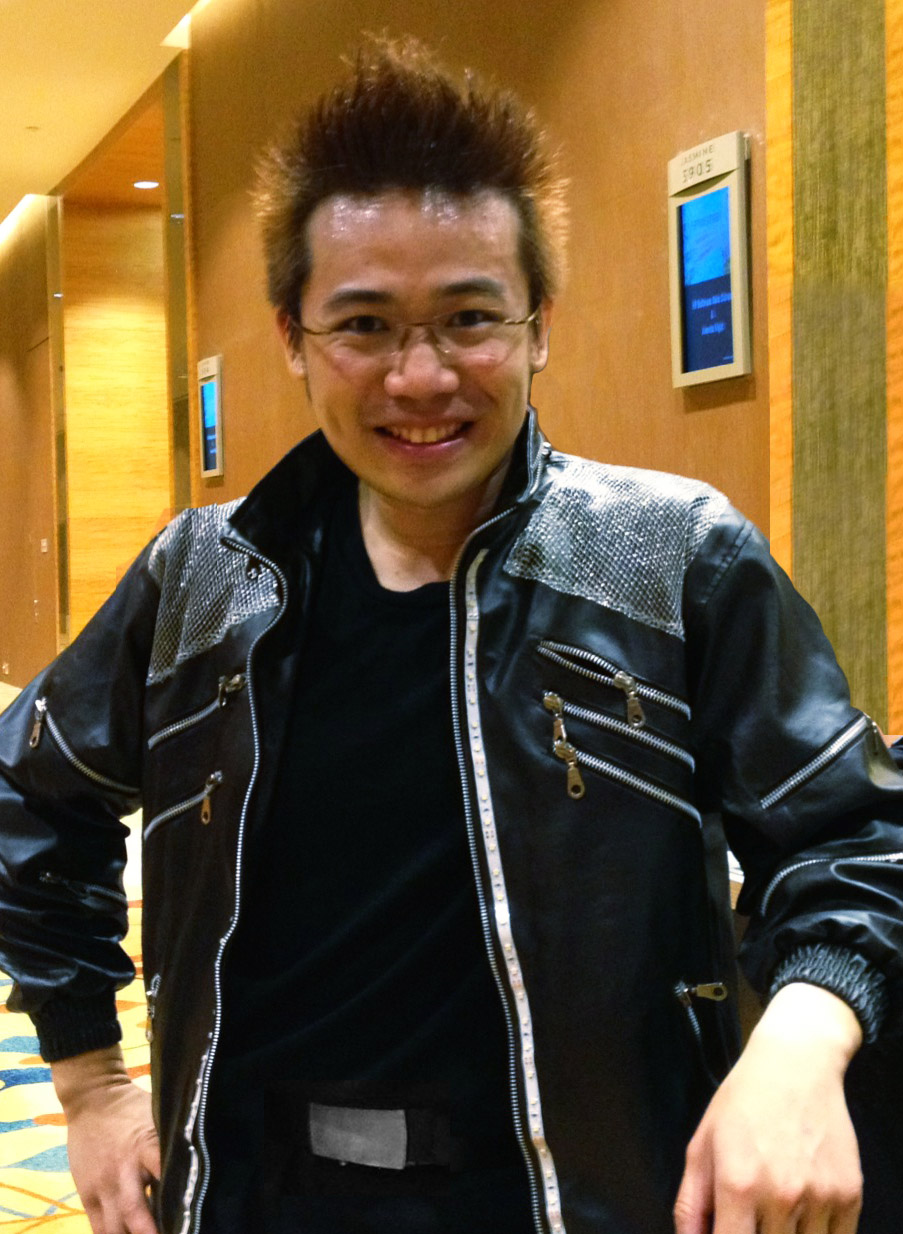
- Kiki in 2012
- Born: Tay Jun Kiat Kiki; 14 December 1981 (age 44); Singapore
- Occupations: Magician, comedian, artistic director
- Website: http://www.kikitay.com

Tay Jun Kiat Kiki (Chinese: 郑俊杰, born 14 December 1981) known professionally as Kiki Tay, is a Singaporean magician, comedian, performing arts director and entrepreneur. Tay is currently the ambassador of Science Centre Singapore and the Special Effects Designer for the Singapore National Day Parade 2017.

== Career ==
Tay's passion for magic began while in school. While working as a part-time supervisor in a fast food restaurant, Tay would spend most of his income on magic props and books, building his stage repertoires and working on his career at a very young age. In his early years, Tay performed for his school functions and charity shows.

Tay began his career as a professional magician in 1995 after he was discovered by Vivien Goh, owner of the Zephyhdom talent management company. Tay worked in the company for five years as a magician, clown, balloon artist and juggler entertaining audiences at birthday parties and corporate events before he moved his focus on directing and consultation work. Tay still performs professionally for corporate events. Tay served in the Singapore Armed Forces (SAF) Music & Drama Company where he received training in music, speech, drama, dance and acting. In his two years service in the company, Tay received the title “Best Actor” in the outstanding artist award.

Tay is the magic and special effects consultant for numerous television and theater productions. He has co-directed mass display segments for the 2009 Asian Youth Games Opening Ceremony, the 2010 Singapore National Day Parade as well as the ASEAN School Games Opening Ceremony. His recent television work, MediaCorp’s "The Illusionist" 魔幻视界 was one of the highest rated drama series on MediaCorp Channel U.

Tay also regularly stars as "Li", the lead role in the $30 million production Songs of the Sea at Sentosa, Singapore.

In June 2014, Tay conducted a 20-piece live orchestra on a floating stage out on Siloso Beach of Sentoa for Sentosa's launch campaign, The 'State of Fun'.

In 2007, Tay was nominated in the Singapore "Spirit of Enterprise Award" for his entrepreneurial spirit.

== Notable achievements ==
- Special Effects Designer for the Singapore National Day Parade 2017
- Co-directed the mass display segment "Forging Into the Future" with choreographer Dan Kwoh for the Singapore Youth Festival Opening Ceremony 2012.
- Co-directed the mass display segment "Spirit of Evolution" with choreographer Dan Kwoh for the 2009 Asian Youth Games opening ceremony.
- Co-directed the mass display segment for the Singapore Youth Festival opening ceremony.
- Co-directed the mass display segment "Sports, Arts & Youth Cultural" with choreographer Dan Kwoh for the 2010 Singapore National Day Parade.
- Co-directed the mass display segment "ASEAN ONE" for the 2011 ASEAN School Games Opening Ceremony
- Directed Sentosa Development Corporation's 2014 "State of Fun" rebranding campaign Fireworks Show.
- Nominated for Singapore's "Spirit of Enterprise Award" for entrepreneurship in 2007.
- Awarded "Best Actor" in Singapore Armed Forces (SAF) Music & Drama Company

== National and large-scale events ==
- Special Effects Designer for the Singapore National Day Parade 2017
- Mass display segment "Spirit of Evolution," Asian Youth Games Opening Ceremony, Singapore 2009 – Co-director.
- Mass display segment "Sports, Arts & Youth Cultural’ 2010 Singapore National Day Parade – Co-director.
- Finale mass display segment, Singapore Youth Festival Opening Ceremony, indoor stadium, Singapore 2008 – Co-director
- Finale mass display segment "ASEAN ONE", ASEAN School Games Opening Ceremony, Max Pavilion, Singapore 2011 - Co-director
- Mass display segment "Forging Into the Future" with choreographer Dan Kwoh for the Singapore Youth Festival Opening Ceremony 2012.
- Fireworks show for Sentosa Development Corporation's 2014 "State of Fun" rebranding campaign - Director

== Television ==
- MediaCorp Channel U ‘The Illusionist’ – Magic Consultant
- MediaCorp Festival 2010 – Illusionist
- MediaCorp Channel 8 Star Awards 2009 – Magic Consultant
- MediaCorp Channel 8 'Ren Ci Charity Show 2007' – Magic Consultant
- MediaCorp Channel 5 "2MM" – Magic Consultant, Illusionist
- MediaCorp Channel 8 "She's The One!" – Magic Consultant
- MediaCorp Channel 8 "A-Star Planners" – Magic Consultant
- MediaCorp Channel 8 "IN-Kids" – Magic Consultant, Magician
- MediaCorp Channel 8 "Gone in 72 Days" – Magic Consultant, Magician
- MediaCorp Channel 8 "Makeover Pte Ltd" – Magic Consultant, Magician
- MediaCorp Channel 8 "My Heartland Carnival" - Featured Artist
- TVB (Hong Kong) Chinese New Year Countdown Show 2013 - Featured Artist
- TVB Chinese New Year Countdown Show 2013 馬國明 & 吳卓羲 combined item - Choreographer

== Theatre ==
- Chestnuts 50, Drama Centre Singapore 2015 - Magic Consultant
- Kumar Stands up for Singapore, Esplanade Theatre 2015 - Special Effects Consultant
- Jack & The Bean-Sprout!, 2013 Drama Centre Singapore - Magic Consultant
- Wonderment, Marina Bay Sands, MasterCard Theatres 2013 - Special Effects Consultant
- SCAPE Magic Carnival, Singapore 2011 - Producer, Playwright, Director
- Cinderel-Lah!, Singapore 2010 – Magic Consultant
- Destination Imagination, Singapore 2010 - Producer, Playwright, Director
- WAAH! Magic!, Singapore 2009 - Producer, Playwright, Director
- Just Tay Kidding!, Singapore 2008 – Producer, Playwright, Director
- Wizard of Oz, Singapore 2008 – Magic Consultant
- Snow White and the Seven Dwarfs, Singapore 2008 – Magic Consultant
- InDanCity, Singapore 2008 – Magic & Special Effects Consultant
- Blithe Spirit, Singapore 2007 – Magic Consultant
- "251", Singapore 2007 – Special Effects Consultant
- Asian Boys Vol.3, Singapore 2007 – Magic Consultant
- The Next Wave, Singapore 2007 - Magic & Special Effects Consultant
- Let Me Entertain You!, Singapore2006 – Magic & Special Effects Consultant
- Little Shop of Horrors, Singapore 2006 – Magic Consultant
- 'Oi! Sleeping Beauty, Singapore 2005 – Magic Consultant
- Aladdin, Singapore 2005 – Magic Consultant
- Ten Brothers, Singapore 2005 – Magic Consultant
