= Children's Day =

Public observance in honor of children

World Children's Day
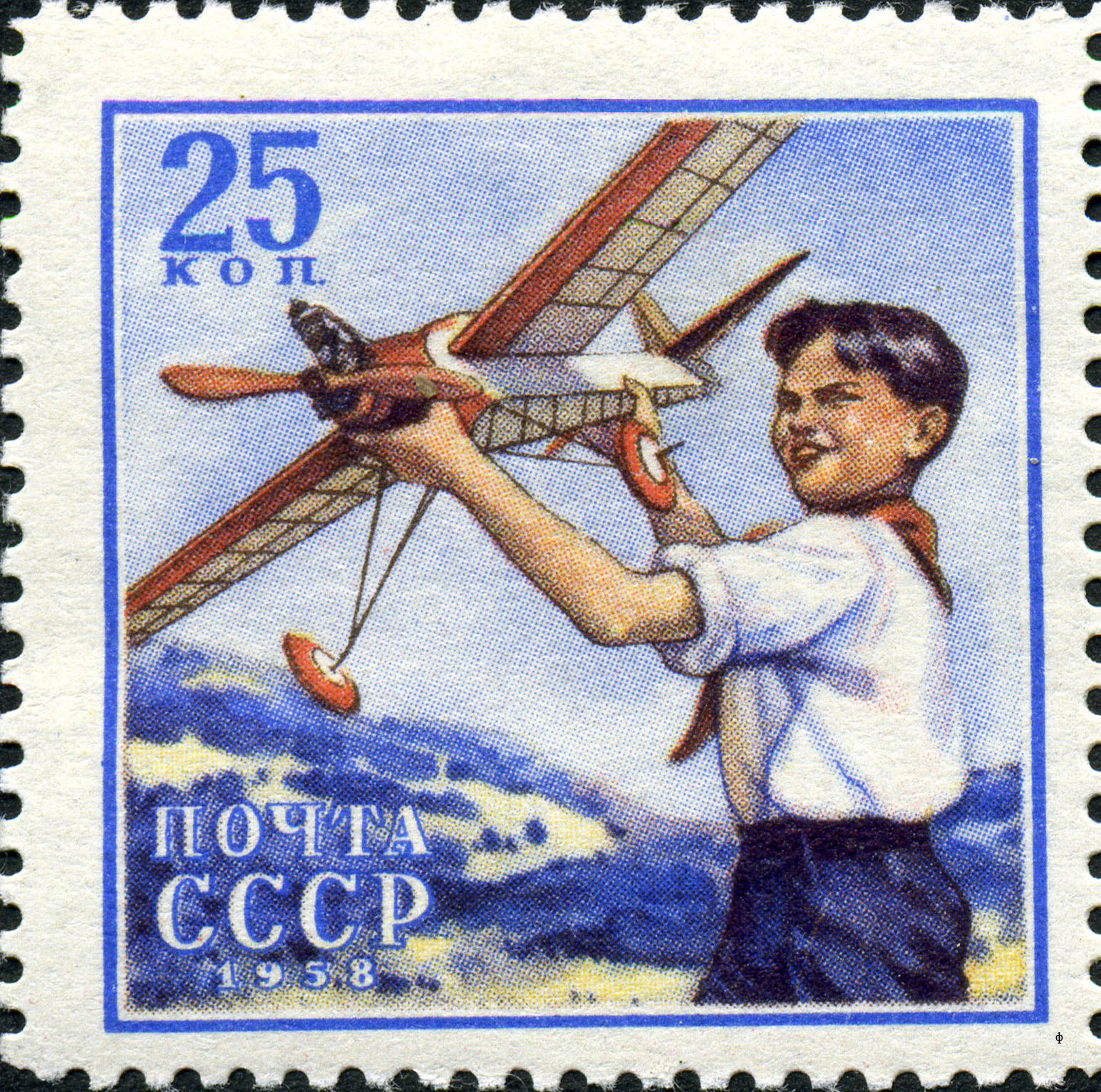
- 1958 Soviet stamp commemorating Children's Day
- Official name: World Children's Day
- Also called: Universal Children's Day
- Observed by: International (UN)
- Type: Cultural, commercial
- Date: 20 November (worldwide), 1 June (Former socialist countries), November 14 (India)
- Duration: 1 week
- Frequency: Annual
- Related to: Siblings Day; International Women's Day; Father's Day; Mother's Day, Parents' Day

Children's Day is a commemorative date celebrated annually in honour of children, whose date of observance varies by country. In 1925, International Children's Day was first proclaimed in Geneva during the World Conference on Child Welfare. Since 1950, it is celebrated on 1 June in many countries that were part of the Eastern Bloc and Non-Aligned Movement, which follow the suggestion from Women's International Democratic Federation. World Children's Day is celebrated on 20 November to commemorate the issuance of the Declaration of the Rights of the Child by the UN General Assembly on 20 November 1959, along with the adoption of the Convention on the Rights of the Child on that date in 1989. In some countries, it is Children's Week and not Children's Day.

== History ==
=== Origins ===
Children's Day began on the second Sunday of June in 1857 by Reverend Dr. Charles Leonard, pastor of the Universalist Church of the Redeemer in Chelsea, Massachusetts: Leonard held a special service dedicated to, and for the children. Leonard named the day Rose Day, though it was later named Flower Sunday, and then named Children's Day.

Children's Day is first officially declared a national holiday by the Republic of Turkey in 1920 with the set date of 23 April. Children's Day has been celebrated nationally since 1920 with the government and the newspapers of the time declaring it a day for the children. However, it was decided that an official confirmation was needed to clarify and justify this celebration and the official declaration was made nationally in 1929 by the founder and the President of the Republic of Turkey, Mustafa Kemal Atatürk.

=== International Children's Day ===
International Children's Day was first proclaimed in Geneva during the World Conference on Child Welfare in 1925. On 4 November 1949, 1 June was established as the International Day for Protection of Children by the Women's International Democratic Federation in Moscow. Since 1950, 1 June is celebrated as Children's Day in many Communist and post-Communist countries.

Children's Day is celebrated annually on June 1, established in November 1949 in Paris by the decision of the Congress of the International Democratic Federation of Women, first celebrated in 1950.

=== World Children's Day ===
On 14 December 1954, a joint resolution by India and Uruguay was passed in the UN General Assembly to encourage all countries to institute a Universal Children's Day, firstly to promote mutual exchange and understanding among children, and secondly to promote the ideals of the UN Charter and the welfare of the world's children. It is now known as World Children's Day, and is celebrated every year on 20 November. That date commemorates the adoption of the Declaration of the Rights of the Child in a unanimous vote by the United Nations General Assembly on 20 November 1959. It also marks the date in 1989 when the UN General Assembly adopted the Convention on the Rights of the Child, which is a legally binding document.

=== Modern initiatives ===
In 2000, the Millennium Development Goals outlined by world leaders to stop the spread of HIV/AIDS by 2015. Albeit this applies to all people, the primary objective concerns children. UNICEF is dedicated to meeting the six of eight goals that apply to the needs of children so that they are all entitled to fundamental rights written in the 1989 Convention on the Rights of the Child. UNICEF delivers vaccines, works with policymakers for good health care and education and works exclusively to help children and protect their rights.

In September 2012, the Secretary-General Ban Ki-moon of the United Nations led the initiative for the education of children. He firstly wants every child to be able to attend school, a goal by 2015. Secondly, to improve the skill set acquired in these schools. Finally, implementing policies regarding education to promote peace, respect, and environmental concern. Universal Children's Day is not just a day to celebrate children for who they are, but to bring awareness to children around the globe that have experienced violence in forms of abuse, exploitation, and discrimination. Children are used as laborers in some countries, immersed in armed conflict, living on the streets, suffering by differences be it religion, minority issues, or disabilities. Children feeling the effects of war can be displaced because of the armed conflict and may suffer physical and psychological trauma. The following violations are described in the term "children and armed conflict": recruitment and child soldiers, killing/maiming of children, abduction of children, attacks on schools/hospitals and not allowing humanitarian access to children. Currently, there are about 153 million children between the ages of 5 and 14 who are forced into child labor. The International Labour Organization in 1999 adopted the Prohibition and Elimination of the Worst Forms of Child Labour including slavery, child prostitution, and child pornography.

A summary of the rights under the convention on the Rights of the Child can be found on the UNICEF website.

Canada co-chaired the World Summit for children in 1990, and in 2002 the United Nations reaffirmed the commitment to complete the agenda of the 1990 World Summit. This added to the UN Secretary-General's report We the Children: End-of Decade review of the follow-up to the World Summit for Children.

The United Nations children's agency released a study referencing the population increase of children will make up 90 percent of the next billion people.

== Dates around the world ==
The officially recognized date of Children's Day varies from country to country.

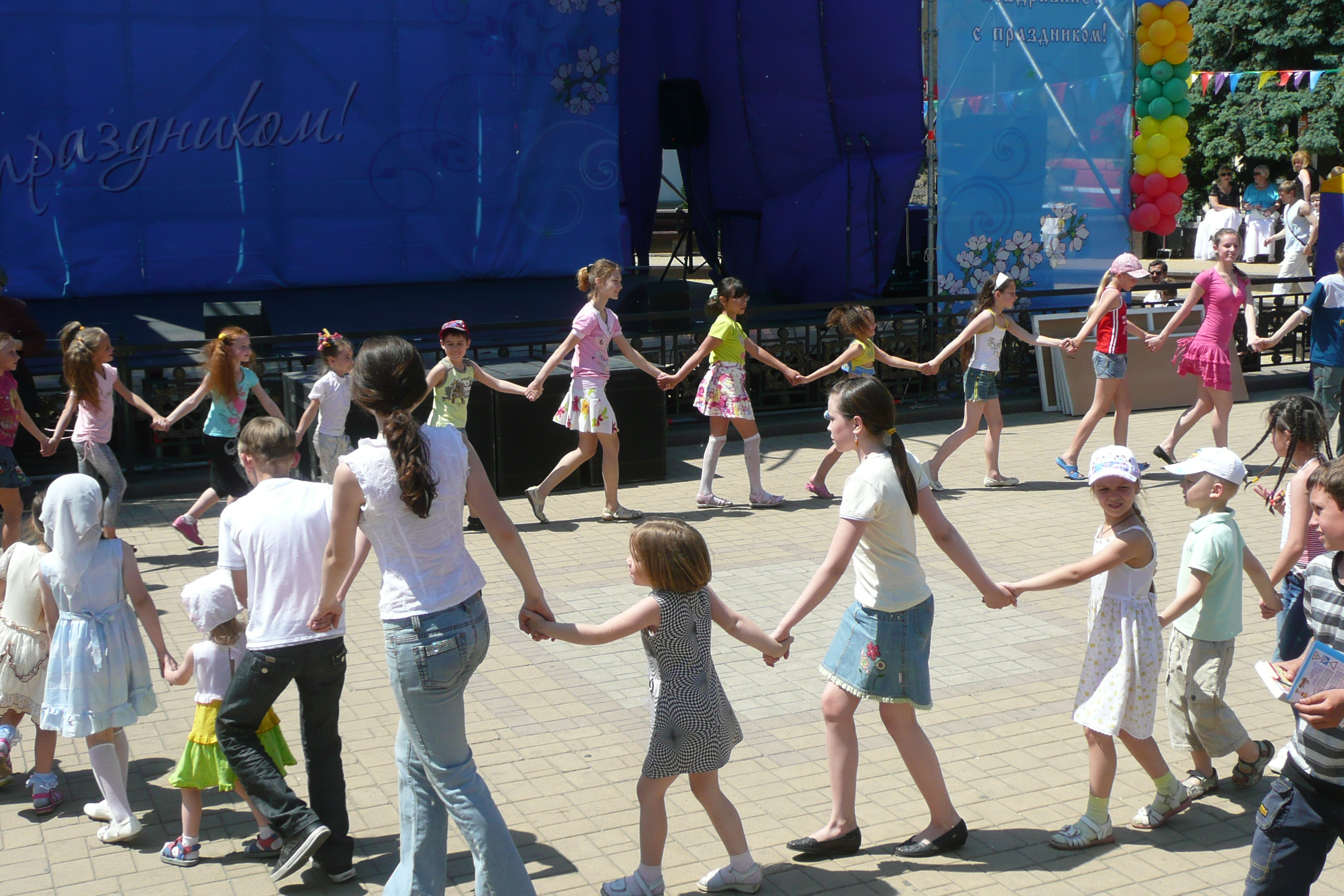
Children's Day in Donetsk, Ukraine, 2011

Children's Day is celebrated on 1 June in former Soviet Union states (including Armenia, Azerbaijan, Belarus, Estonia, Georgia, Kazakhstan, Kyrgyzstan, Latvia, Moldova, Russia, Tajikistan, Turkmenistan, Uzbekistan) as well as other former or current communist states (Albania, Angola, Benin, Bosnia and Herzegovina, Bulgaria, Cambodia, Croatia, Cuba, Czech Republic, Slovakia, Ethiopia, East Germany, Kosovo, Laos, Mongolia, Montenegro, Mozambique, mainland China, North Macedonia, Poland, Portugal, Romania, Serbia, Slovenia, Tanzania, Vietnam and Yemen, and to the lesser extent in Israel due to the migration of its Soviet Jewish population). This includes 24 countries which regained independence from the USSR, seceded from Yugoslavia Federation, as well as Czechoslovakia and Ethiopia after their respective splits. Ukraine moved its Children's Day celebration from 1 June to 20 November in 2025.

World Children's Day is celebrated on 20 November to commemorate the Declaration of the Rights of the Child by the UN General Assembly on 20 November 1959.

This section lists some significant examples, in order of date of observance.

Gregorian calendar
| Occurrence | Dates | Country |
|---|---|---|
| First Friday of January | 3 January 2025; 2 January 2026; 1 January 2027 | Bahamas |
| | 11 January | Tunisia |
| Second Saturday of January | 11 January 2025; 10 January 2026; 9 January 2027 | Thailand |
| Second Sunday of February | 9 February 2025; 8 February 2026; 14 February 2027 | Cook Islands; Nauru; Niue; Tokelau; Cayman Islands |
| | 13 February | Myanmar |
| First Sunday of March | 2 March 2025; 1 March 2026; 7 March 2027 | New Zealand |
| | 15 March | United Arab Emirates |
| | 17 March | Bangladesh |
| | 21 March | Libya |
| | 4 April (4 April Children's Day) | Taiwan; Hong Kong |
| | 5 April | Palestine |
| | 12 April | Bolivia |
| | 15 April | Spain |
| Last Saturday of April | 26 April 2025; 25 April 2026; 24 April 2027 | Colombia |
| National Sovereignty and Children's Day | 23 April | Turkey |
| | 30 April | Mexico |
| | 5 May | South Korea; Japan |
| Second Sunday of May | 11 May 2025; 10 May 2026; 9 May 2027 | United Kingdom |
| | 10 May | Maldives |
| | 17 May | Norway |
| Third Friday of May | 16 May 2025; 15 May 2026; 21 May 2027 | Lithuania |
| | 27 May | Nigeria |
| Last Sunday of May | 25 May 2025; 31 May 2026; 30 May 2027 | Hungary |
| Ascension Day | 29 May 2025; 14 May 2026; 6 May 2027 | American Samoa; Falkland Islands; Solomon Islands |
| | 1 June | Albania; Algeria; Angola; Armenia; Azerbaijan; Belarus; Benin; Bulgaria; Bosnia and Herzegovina; China; Cambodia; Czechia; East Timor; Ecuador; Estonia; Ethiopia; Georgia; Guinea-Bissau; Hong Kong; Kazakhstan; Kosovo; Kurdistan Region; Kyrgyzstan; Laos; Latvia; Macau; Moldova; Mongolia; Montenegro; Mozambique; Myanmar; Nicaragua; North Korea; North Macedonia; Poland; Portugal; Romania; Russia; São Tomé and Príncipe; Serbia; Slovakia; Slovenia; Tajikistan; Tanzania; Turkmenistan; Uzbekistan; Vietnam; Yemen |
| Second Sunday of June | 8 June 2025; 14 June 2026; 13 June 2027 | Haiti; United States |
| | 1 July | Pakistan |
| Third Sunday of July | 20 July 2025; 19 July 2026; 18 July 2027 | Cuba; Panama; Venezuela |
| | 23 July | Indonesia |
| First Sunday of August | 3 August 2025; 2 August 2026; 1 August 2027 | Uruguay |
| Second Sunday of August | 9 August 2026 | Chile |
| | 16 August | Paraguay |
| Third Sunday of August | 17 August 2025; 16 August 2026; 15 August 2027 | Argentina; Peru |
| | 9 September | Costa Rica |
| | 10 September | Honduras |
| | 20 September | Austria; Germany |
| | 1 October | El Salvador; Guatemala; Sri Lanka |
| First Friday of October | 3 October 2025; 2 October 2026; 1 October 2027 | Singapore |
| First Wednesday of October (Children's Day recognition and assignation); Second Sunday of August (Children's Day observance) | 1 October 2025; 7 October 2026; 6 October 2027 | Chile |
| | 8 October | Iran |
| | 12 October | Brazil |
| Fourth Saturday of October | 25 October 2025; 24 October 2026; 23 October 2027 | Malaysia |
| Fourth Saturday of October | 25–2 November 2025; 24–1 November 2026; 23–31 October 2027; Celebrated as National Children's Week | Australia |
| First Saturday of November | 1 November 2025; 7 November 2026; 6 November 2027 | South Africa |
| | 14 November | India |
| | 20 November | (Arab League) Arab World; Azerbaijan; Canada; Croatia; Cyprus; Denmark; Egypt; Ethiopia; Finland; France; Greece; Ireland; Israel; Italy; Kenya; Malaysia; Netherlands; North Macedonia; Philippines; Serbia; Slovenia; South Africa; Spain; Sweden; Switzerland; Trinidad and Tobago; Ukraine; Zambia |
| | 5 December | Suriname |
| | 23 December | South Sudan; Sudan |
| | 25 December | Congo; Congo DR; Cameroon; Equatorial Guinea; Gabon; Chad; Central African Republic |
Hindu calendar
| Occurrence | Equivalent Gregorian dates | Country |
| 29 Bhadra | 14 September 2025; 14 September 2026; 14 September 2027; 15 September 2028 | Nepal |
Vietnamese calendar
| Occurrence | Equivalent Gregorian dates | Country |
| 15th day of eighth month | 6 October 2025; 25 September 2026; 15 September 2027 | Vietnam (Tết Trung Thu) |

== List by country and region ==
=== Africa ===
==== Cameroon ====
In Cameroon, Children's Day was established as a holiday in 1990.

==== Central Africa ====
In Congo, Congo DR, Cameroon, Equatorial Guinea, Gabon, Chad, Central African Republic, Children's Day is celebrated on 25 December to honor all the children there.

==== Egypt ====
In Egypt, Children's Day is celebrated every 20 November with festivals and games for children, but not in every city like Cairo, Alexandria, etc.

==== Eritrea ====
In Eritrea, Children's Day is celebrated on 8 December.

==== Liberia ====
In Liberia, Children's Day was established as a holiday in 1990.

==== Mauritius ====
In Mauritius, Children's Day was established in 1991 as the International Day of the African Child.

==== Mozambique ====
In Mozambique, the International Children's Day is also celebrated on 1 June.

==== Nigeria ====
Children's Day is celebrated on 27 May in Nigeria. It was established as a holiday in 1964. It is a public holiday for Primary and Secondary school children. Due to the large size of the country, only a few groups of children (schools or other organizations) are selected to march past in a parade. The children are usually given treats such as an outing or doing jobs that adults would normally do. In some situations, primary and secondary school children compete in military parades format for a prize which will be given at the end of the competition. Religious groups in Nigeria also celebrate children's day in grand style. Many private and public organizations usually put together children's party for privileged and less privileged children in a bid to give them a sense of belonging. It is also a day media organizations analyze the plight of children in the society and efforts government and non-government agencies make to better a lot of children.

==== South Africa ====
In South Africa, Children's Day is on the first Saturday of November.

==== South Sudan ====
In South Sudan, Children's Day is celebrated on 23 December, the birthday of South Sudan's "greatest child" according to tribal mythology.

==== Tunisia ====
Children's Day in Tunisia is celebrated on 11 January every year. It was established as a holiday in 1995. It is a day in which Tunisians observe the rights of children and remind themselves that children are the future builders and developers of the country and the world.

==== Zimbabwe ====
Children's Day was established as a holiday in Zimbabwe in 1990 (Day of the African Child).

=== Asia ===
==== Armenia ====
In Armenia, Children's Day is celebrated on 1 June.

==== Azerbaijan ====
In Azerbaijan, Children's Day is celebrated on 1 June.

==== Bangladesh ====
Since 2009, JAAGO Foundation has been celebrating International Children's Day (বিশ্ব শিশু দিবস) throughout Bangladesh by engaging youth and creating awareness about children's right on 20 November which is the declared Universal Children's Day by the United Nations. After this movement gained a lot of attraction, Bangladesh started celebrating, Children's Day on 17 March on the birthday of the Father of the Nation Bangabandhu Sheikh Mujibur Rahman.

==== Cambodia ====
In Cambodia, Children's Day is celebrated on 1 June.

==== China ====
Children's Day (PRC)
- Simplified Chinese: 六一国际儿童节
- Traditional Chinese: 六一國際兒童節
Transcriptions
Standard Mandarin
- Hanyu Pinyin: Liù Yī Guójì Értóng Jié
- Wade–Giles: Liu^{4}-i^{1} Kuo^{2}-chi^{4} Erh^{2}-t'ung^{2} Chieh^{2}
- Yale Romanization: lyou4 yi1 gwo2 ji4 er2 tung2 jye2
Yue: Cantonese
- Jyutping: luk6 jat1 gwok3 zai3 ji4 tung4 zit3

In the People's Republic of China, Children's Day is celebrated on 1 June and is formally known as "the June 1 International Children's Day". When the People's Republic of China was first established in 1949, the State Council (Cabinet) designated a half-day holiday for all primary schools on 1 June, following the lead of the Soviet Union. This was later made into a full day's break in 1956 with The Announcement by the State Council to make 1 June Children's Day a One-Day Holiday. Schools usually hold activities such as children's performances, camping trips, or free movies on Children's Day or the day before to allow students to have fun. Children of civil servants might also receive small gifts from the government until they are fourteen, and Civil servants who have children sometimes have a half-day holiday on 1 June to spend more time with their children. Investiture and farewell ceremonies of the Young Pioneers of China are usually held on 1 June as well. The entrance of children under 14 into the Forbidden City is free on 1 June, while each accompanying adult gets 50% off.

==== Hong Kong ====
Children's Day (Chinese: 兒童節; Jyutping: ji4 tung4 zit3) is unofficially celebrated on 4 April, although the Hong Kong Labour and Welfare Bureau designated June 1 as "International Children's Day" in 2014.

==== India ====
Children's Day is celebrated across India to increase awareness of the rights, care and education of children. It is celebrated on 14 November every year as a tribute to India's first Prime Minister, Jawaharlal Nehru. Fondly known as "Chacha (Uncle) Nehru" among children, he advocated for children to have a fulfilling education. On this day, many educational and motivational programs are held across India, by and for children.

==== Indonesia ====
In Indonesia, National Children's Day is commemorated on 23 July. It was first commemorated in 1984.

==== Japan ====
Japan's Children's Day (こどもの日, kodomo no hi) is celebrated on 5 May, a National Holiday since 1948, to celebrate the happiness of all children and to express gratitude toward mothers. There is a long tradition, from the 8th century, to celebrate children's day twice a year; 3 March for girls and on 5 May for boys. On 3 March, also known as the Doll Festival, Japanese people decorate their households with traditional Heian Period doll sets and plum blossom, and drink Amazake. On 5 May, also known as 端午の節句 (tango-no sekku), they fly carp streamers outside, display Samurai dolls, and eat Kashiwa mochi and chimaki. There were some who argued in 1948 that 3 March should also be a National Holiday.

==== Kazakhstan ====
The International Children's Day is celebrated annually on 1 June and is established as a national holiday for children. Over 3 million children across Kazakhstan celebrate the holiday with special children's events.

==== North Korea ====
North Korean Children's Day is celebrated on 1 June as the International Children's Day (국제 아동절). Before 1945, it was celebrated on 1 May. There is also a day called 조선소년단창립절 (Korean Children's Union Day) on 6 June.

==== South Korea ====
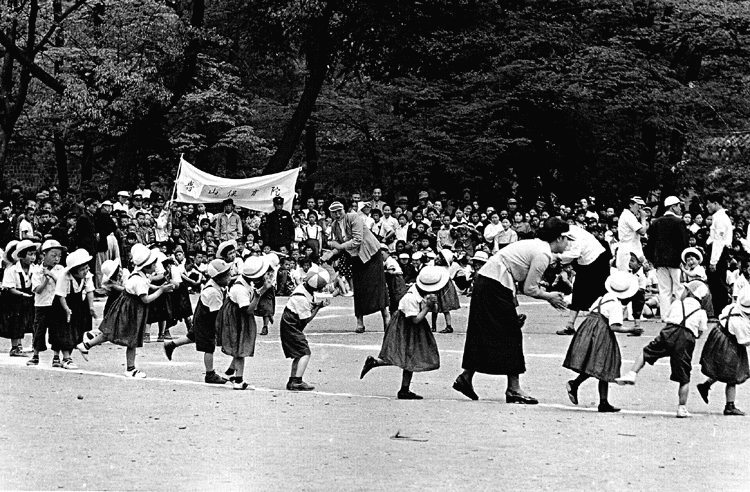
Children's day in Seoul, South Korea, 5 May 1954

In the Republic of Korea (South Korea), 5 May is officially recognized as Children's Day (어린이날), and one of the public holidays. Parents often give presents to their children, as well as spend time with them. The children are taken on excursions to zoos, museums, and various venues of children-oriented entertainment. Children's Day events are becoming more commercial, becoming important events to increase sales of children's products.

Children's Day was first conceived by progressive ethnic Korean students, with Korean independence movement leaders against Japanese colonialism. From Jinju, many people gathered to promote and improve the social status of children and encourage adults to teach awareness of their deprived sovereignty. In 1923, the ethnic Korean student group in Tokyo, ″Saekdong-hoe″ (색동회), proclaimed the first Children's Day on May Day, later on 7 May. Bang Jeong-hwan, a co-founder of Saekdong-hoe, first coined the modern Korean word for children, eorini (어린이), replacing the previous slang aenom (애놈) or esaekki (애새끼). Celebration of Children's Day in Korea has enlightened people about children's fundamental human rights.

Since 1939, Government-General of Chosen, viewing Children's Day as one of the nationalist movement by Korean independence activists, had oppressed the Children's Day celebration. Since 1945, Children's Day celebration has been resumed. The children's welfare law written in the constitution officially designated 5 May as Children's Day in 1961. And by 'the law of holiday of government office', Children's day became a holiday in Korea in 1970. The holiday is also marks the unofficial beginning of summer in the country, as the solar term of lixia coincides with it.

==== Laos ====
In Laos, Children's Day is celebrated on 1 June and on the same day there is also the National Tree Planting Day

==== Malaysia ====
It is held traditionally on 1 October. Nowadays it is also celebrated on 20 November (following International Children's Day).

==== Maldives ====
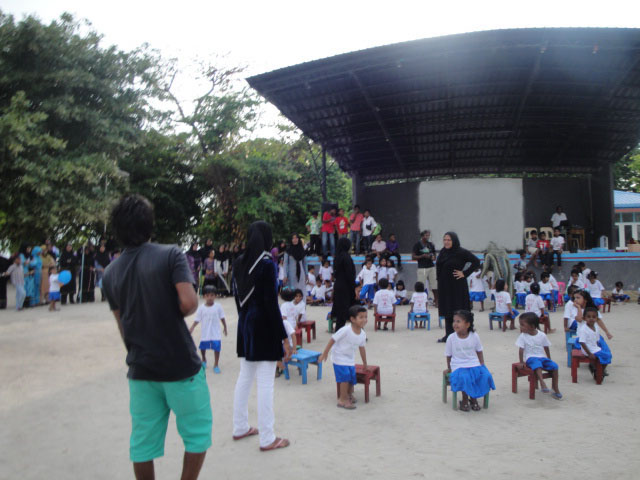
Children's Day celebration in Kendhoo, Maldives

In Maldives, Children's Day (Kudakudhinge Dhuvas) is celebrated on 10 May. On this day all the school children go to school to the event to celebrate Children's Day. The schools that are involved would also organize numerous activities for their pupils.

==== Mongolia ====
In Mongolia, the International Children's Day is celebrated on 1 June. It is also known as "Эх үрсийн баяр". On 1 June every child receives presents, gifts and much more. There are also festivals, sales and sweets.

==== Myanmar ====
In Myanmar, Children's Day is celebrated on 13 February.

In 1954, the United Nations established Universal Children's Day dedicated to improving children's welfare worldwide. It is celebrated annually on 20 November. Besides, many countries have their own national holidays to celebrate children. For example, Children's Day in Myanmar (former Burma) is celebrated on 13 February.

The date of Myanmar's Children's Day coincides with the birthday of Aung San, a Burmese revolutionary, politician and general who is considered the Father of the Nation in present-day Myanmar. He fought for Burma's independence from Japan and the United Kingdom. It was decided to celebrate Aung San's birthday as Children's Day because "he fought for a better future for Burmese children".

In the late 1980s, a military dictatorship was established in Myanmar. Naturally, the military government didn't encourage the celebration of Aung San's birthday and, by extension, Children's Day.

The situation began to change after the 2011–2012 democratic reforms. Today, Children's Day is officially celebrated in schools across Myanmar.

On 13 February, Burmese schools host special events for students. Their main goal is to emphasize the importance of education for the future of Burmese children, as well as to raise awareness of the problems that children and their parents face on a daily basis.

(This is a direct copy of the original).

==== Nepal ====
In Nepal, Children's Day (बाल दिवस) is celebrated on Bhadra 29 according to the Nepali Calendar (August–September) after signing the child rights agreement with the UN. Earlier during the Shah Rule, Nepal used to observe Children's Day on Bhadra 4 on the birthday of Queen Mother Ratna Rajya Laxmi Devi Shah. It is celebrated by conducting various programs in various institutions around Nepal. It was established as a holiday in 1990. After the establishment of the federalism government, Child right is under the Ministry of Women, Children, and Senior Citizens. On the occasion of the 58th National Children's Day Bhadra 29th 2079 Nepali Calendar with the theme of " The Foundation of Child-Friendly Society: Responsible Family, Responsible Government" celebrates Children's Day in the different areas of Nepal.

==== Pakistan ====
In Pakistan, the National Assembly on 16 December 2015 passed a unanimous resolution expressing grief and sadness over the massacre by the Taliban of 151 students and teachers of Army Public School Peshawar on 16 December 2014. The NA recommended that 16 December should be observed as Pakistan Children Day in memory of the victims.

Children's Day had previously been celebrated on 1 July. In Punjab the Child Rights Cell of Department of Social Welfare Punjab collaborates with UNICEF to celebrate this day. The Voice of Children Islamabad, an NGO, also celebrates Children's Day and arranges activities for children and parents on that day. The EPO and SFB also celebrate Children's day and arrange interactive entertainment sessions for children and parents.

Many festivals and events are organized by schools and organizations for Children's Day, with entertainment and activities for families. Many charitable organizations hold functions or partner with bigger organizations.

==== Palestine ====
Children day (Arabic: يوم الطفل الفلسطيني) is celebrated in the State of Palestine on 5 April.

On 5 April 1995, at the First Palestinian Child Conference, the late President Yasser Arafat declared his commitment to the International Convention on the Rights of the Child, and declared 5 April a day for the Palestinian child; Since that date, the Palestinian people commemorate this day every year, in all its official institutions, and in partnership with civil and international institutions dealing with childhood in Palestine, by organizing many recreational, cultural, educational, sports and media activities and activities to support the children of Palestine.

According to a report by the Palestinian Prisoners' Club, Israeli authorities have arrested 745 Palestinians under the age of 18 from the beginning of 2019 to the end of October 2019. The Prisoners Club said in a report on the eve of the International Children's Day 2019, which falls on 20 November each year, that approximately (200) children continue to be detained by the occupation authorities in the detention centers "Megiddo, Ofer and Damon", in addition to a number of other children held in private centers in Jerusalem. The Prisoners' Club pointed to a series of actions carried out by the Israeli occupation authorities against violent youths during their arrest process, which starts from the first moment of their arrest and taken from their homes late at night. They are under pressure and threats, sentencing in absentia, and financial penalties and fines. According to the report, punishments against the violent youths during their detention include depriving them from completing their studies, in addition to depriving some of them from family visits.

==== Philippines ====
In the Philippines, Republic Act No. 10661 declares the month of November as Children's Month in commemoration of the adoption of the convention on the Rights of the Child by the United Nations General Assembly on 20 November 1989.

==== Singapore ====
Historically, 1 October was the day which Singapore officially celebrates Children's Day. A similar event celebrated every year is Youth Day, which is celebrated on the first Sunday of July every year, which is a school holiday for primary, secondary and junior college students. In Kindergarten and primary school children in Singapore do not have to attend school on Children's Day. From 2011, Children's Day was celebrated on the first Friday of October. It is usually celebrated by singing a Children's Day song called Semoga Bahagia (May you achieve happiness) in Malay composed by Mr Zubir Said, also composer of their national anthem Majulah Singapura, followed by a performance by their teachers and presents given by their teachers on the day before Children's Day and the day itself is a School Holiday. Secondary school/ middle school students still need to go to school on this day but teachers often organise special events and activities so older children could still celebrate. Children's Day in Singapore is also celebrated not only to celebrate childhood but also to remind them of issues faced by children around the world.

==== Sri Lanka ====
In Sri Lanka, Children's Day is celebrated on 1 October, which they call in Sinhala as 'Loka Lama Dinaya' In this day many schools and orphanage homes celebrate by giving gifts to children.

==== Taiwan ====
Children's Day
- Traditional Chinese: 婦女節、兒童節合併假期
Transcriptions
Standard Mandarin
- Hanyu Pinyin: Fùnǚ Jié, Értóng Jié Hébìng Jiàqí
- Wade–Giles: Fu^{4}-nü^{3} Chieh^{2}, Erh^{2}-t'ung^{2} Chieh^{2} He^{2}-ping^{4} Chia^{4}-ch'i^{2}
Southern Min
- Hokkien POJ: Hū-lí-chiat, Jî-tông-chiat Ha̍p-pèng Ká-kî
- Tâi-lô: Hū-lí-tsiat, Jî-tông-tsiat Ha̍p-pìng Ká-kî

Taiwan designated 4 April as Children's Day (Chinese: 兒童節; pinyin: Értóng Jié), pursuant to Article 5 of the Order to Implement Commemoration Days and Holidays. The holiday dates back to 1931 and since then schools often hold special activities to celebrate the occasion. Because of pressure from parents demanding to accompany their children in the celebration, Taiwan celebrated Women's Day together with Children's Day on 4 April 1991. Since then, 4 April has been known as "The Combined Holidays of Women's Day and Children's Day" (Chinese: 婦女節). It has been a public holiday of Taiwan since 2011.

The Executive Yuan stipulated in Article 5 of the "Memorial Day and Festival Implementation Measures" that on 4 April, Children's Day, relevant organs, groups, and schools held celebration activities [2]. A one-day holiday was merged with Women's Day from 1991 to 1997 (formally known as "Women's Day, Children's Day Merger Holiday"). After 1998, the holiday was canceled and it was incorporated into the week of holiday. In 1998, two days before the rest of the week, the children of elementary and junior high school students had a day off. Since 2011, it has returned to the national holiday and the country has a holiday for one day. In 2012, if the law is revised again, if it meets the same day as the Ching Ming Festival, it will be on 3 April of the previous day, and if it is on Thursday, it will be on the following day.

==== Thailand ====
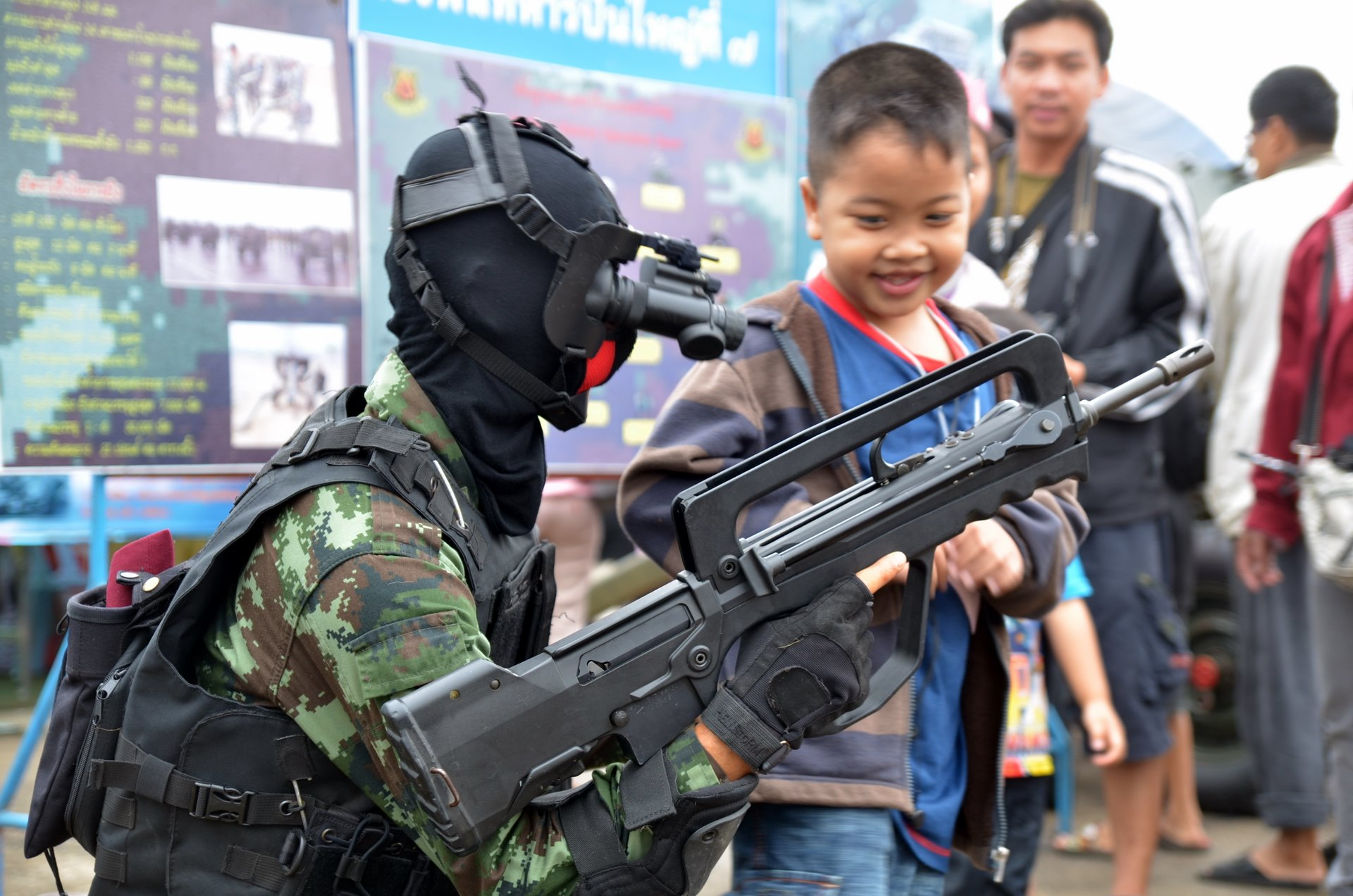
Children's Day 2012 at the Chiang Mai Royal Thai Air Force base

Thailand National Children's Day (Thai: วันเด็กแห่งชาติ) is celebrated on the second Saturday in January. Known as "Wan Dek" in Thailand, Children's Day is celebrated to give children the opportunity to have fun and to create awareness about their significant role in the development of the country. It was established as a holiday in 1955.

Usually, His Majesty the King gives advice addressing the children while the Supreme Patriarch of Thailand gives moral teaching. The Prime Minister also usually gives each Children's Day a theme and a slogan.

Many Government offices are open to children and their family; this includes the Government House, the Parliament House Complex and various Military installations. These events may include a guided tour and an exhibition. A notable example is the guided tour at the Government House, where children have an opportunity to view the Prime Minister's office and sit at the bureau. The Royal Thai Air Force usually invites children to go and explore the aircraft and the Bangkok Bank distributes stationeries, such as pens, pencils, and books to every child that enters the bank as a community service. Many organizations from both the government and commercial sectors have celebration activities for children. Children can enter zoos or ride buses for free.

There is a Thai saying that states, "Children are the future of the nation, if the children are intelligent, the country will be prosperous."

==== Turkey ====
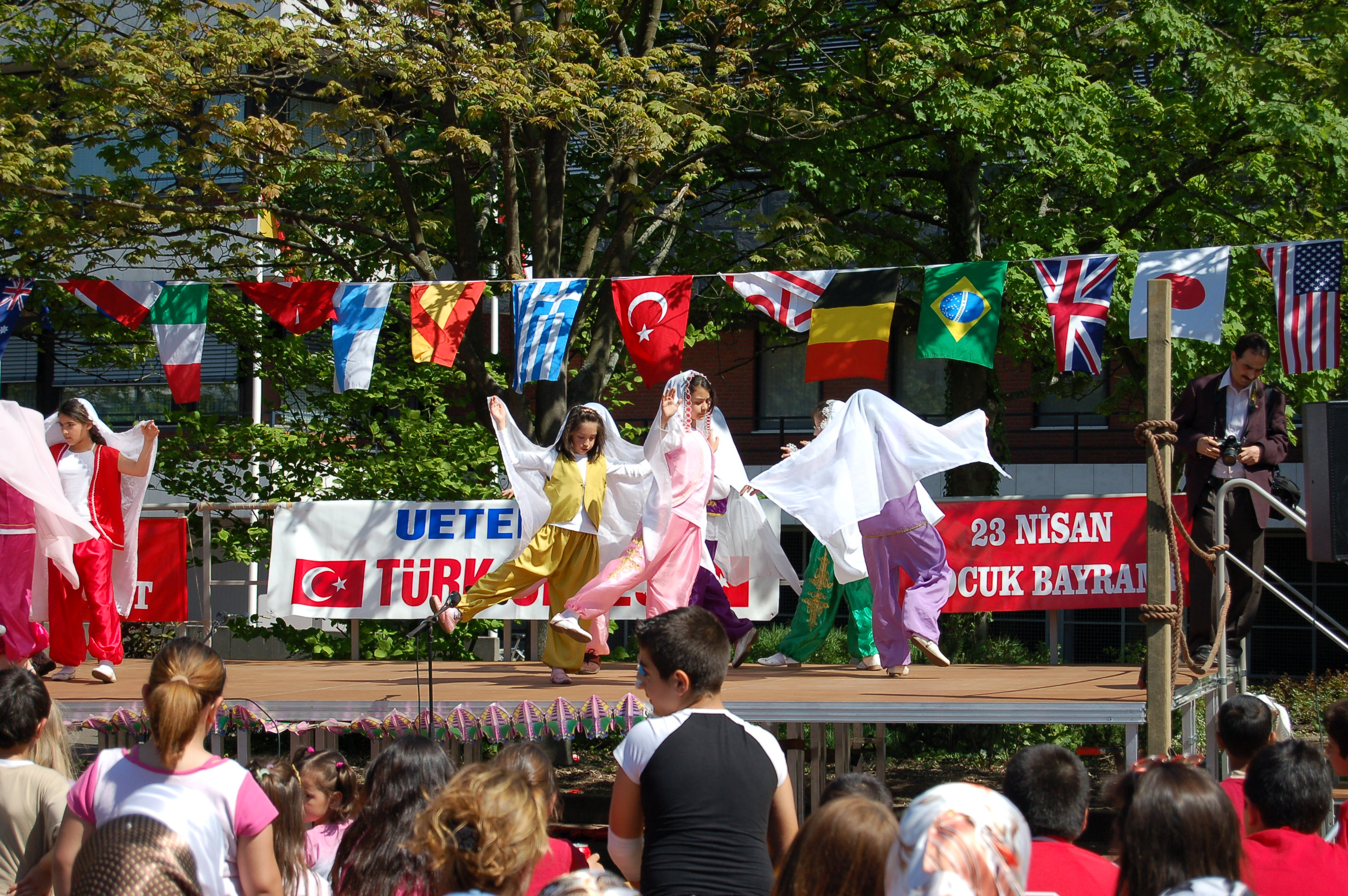
"The Holiday of National Sovereignty and Children" (Turkey), celebrated in Germany, in 2011

The Grand National Assembly of Turkey was established on 1920, 23 April, and to commemorate the event, 23 April was proclaimed a national holiday in 1921. Since 1927 it has also become Children's Day (Turkish: Ulusal Egemenlik ve Çocuk Bayramı, literally "The Holiday of National Sovereignty and Children"), an official holiday dedicated to the children of Turkey and (from 1979 on) the world.

In addition to holding many domestic celebratory events such as stadium performances, Turkey also houses TRT International April 23 Children's Festival, where groups of children from other countries are invited to participate in the festivities while staying at Turkish families' homes.

==== Qatar ====
Qatar marked its first Qatar Children's day on 15 March 2018 & it coincides with the date on which the Wudeema law (Child protection law) was issued. Qatar also celebrates Universal Children's day on 20 November.

==== United Arab Emirates ====
In United Arab Emirates, Children's Day is celebrated on 15 March.

==== Uzbekistan ====
In Uzbekistan, Children's Day is celebrated on 1 June.

==== Vietnam ====
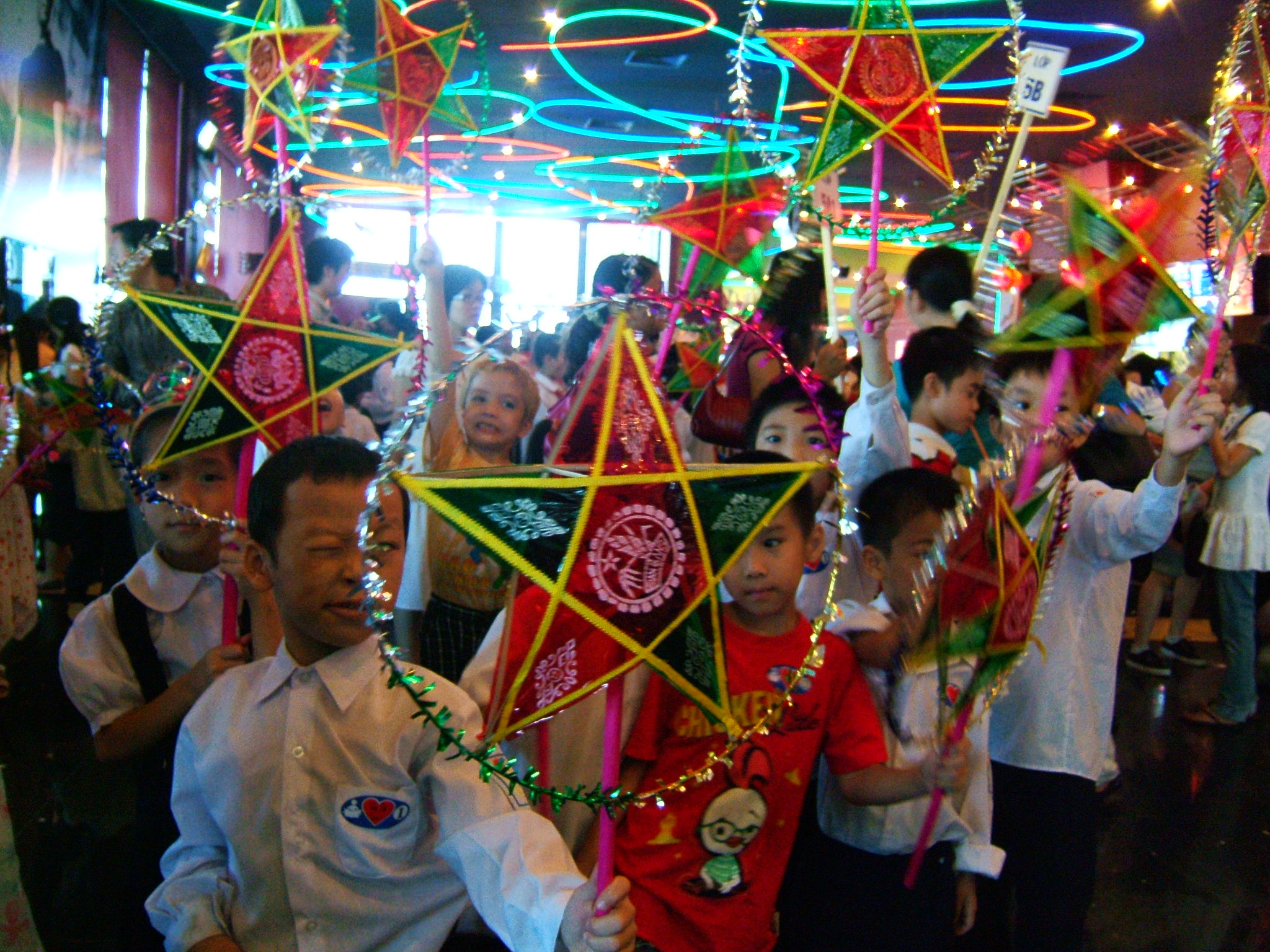
Mid-Autumn Festival in Vietnam

In Vietnam, Children's Day is celebrated on 1 June as ICD and on the full moon of the 8th lunar month during the Mid-Autumn Festival.

=== Europe ===
==== Albania ====
Children's day in Albania is celebrated on 1 June.

==== Bosnia and Herzegovina ====
In Bosnia and Herzegovina, Children's Day was established as a holiday in 1993.

==== Bulgaria ====
In Bulgaria, Children's day (Ден на детето) is celebrated on 1 June. Traditionally kids receive very special attention from their family, including Birthday-like presents. In the past, all drivers were expected to drive with their lights on all day long to demonstrate extra vigilance over children's safety. Now it is compulsory to drive with the lights on every day of the year.

==== Croatia ====
In Croatia, Children's Day is celebrated on 20 November.

==== Czech Republic ====
In Czech Republic, Children's Day (Mezinárodní den dětí) is celebrated on 1 June.

==== Denmark ====
In Denmark, Children's Day is known as Børnenes Dag and is celebrated on 20 November.

==== Estonia ====
In Estonia, Children's Day is known as Day for Protection of Children (lastekaitsepäev) and is celebrated on 1 June. Since 2021 it is also recognised as a national holiday and flag day. On flag days, government and local authority agencies and legal persons in public law shall hoist the Estonian flag.

On this day, many free public events are organized all over the country.

==== Finland ====
In Finland, Children's Day is known as Day of Children's Rights and is celebrated on 20 November.

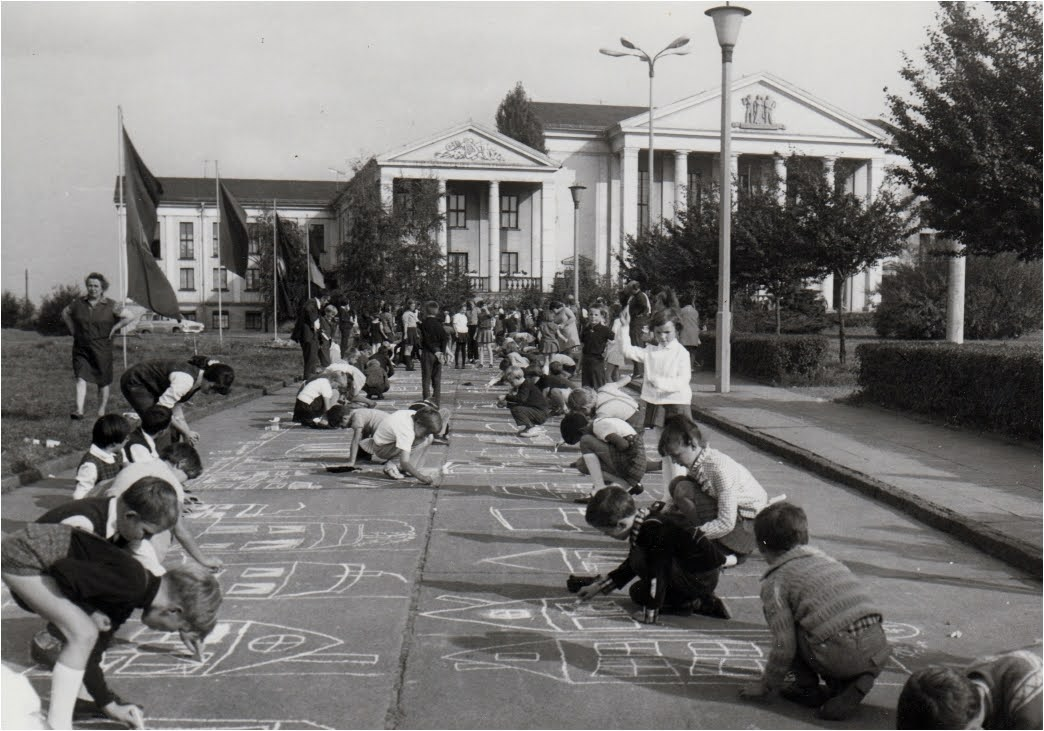
Children's Day in East Germany during the 1960s

==== Germany ====
In Germany, during the Cold War, Children's Day (Kindertag) was handled quite differently in West Germany and East Germany. East Germany (GDR) celebrated International Children's Day (Internationaler Kindertag) on 1 June; West Germany (FRG) celebrated Universal Children's Day (Weltkindertag) on 20 September.

The customs of Children's Day were also significantly different in West and East Germany. In East Germany, the holiday was introduced in 1950 and was then held yearly. On this day of the year, children would typically be congratulated and would receive presents from their parents and would have special activities in school, such as field trips.

After the reunification of East and West Germany occurred in 1990, Universal Children's Day has become official for whole Germany. This, however, was not accepted by large parts of the East German population. Most parents still celebrate Children's Day on the former date of 1 June, and public events pertaining to Children's Day take place on 20 September (Weltkindertag). Since 2019 it is a state holiday in the former GDR state of Thuringia.

==== Greece ====
In Greece, Children's Day is celebrated on 20 November. It was established on 11 December 1946 when Unicef was founded.

==== Hungary ====
Children's Week began in Hungary in 1931. Since 1950 it has been reduced to Children's Day, taking place on the last Sunday in May.

==== Ireland ====
In Ireland, Universal Children's Day is celebrated on 20 November.

==== Italy ====
In Italy, Children's day (in Italy usually referred to as "Giornata nazionale dei diritti dell'infanzia e dell'adolescenza", i.e. "National day for childhood and adolescence rights") is celebrated on 20 November every year, since it was established in 1997 due to law no. 451.

==== Moldova ====
In Moldova, International Children's Day is celebrated on 1 June. From 2016, the day has been declared a public holiday.

==== Norway ====
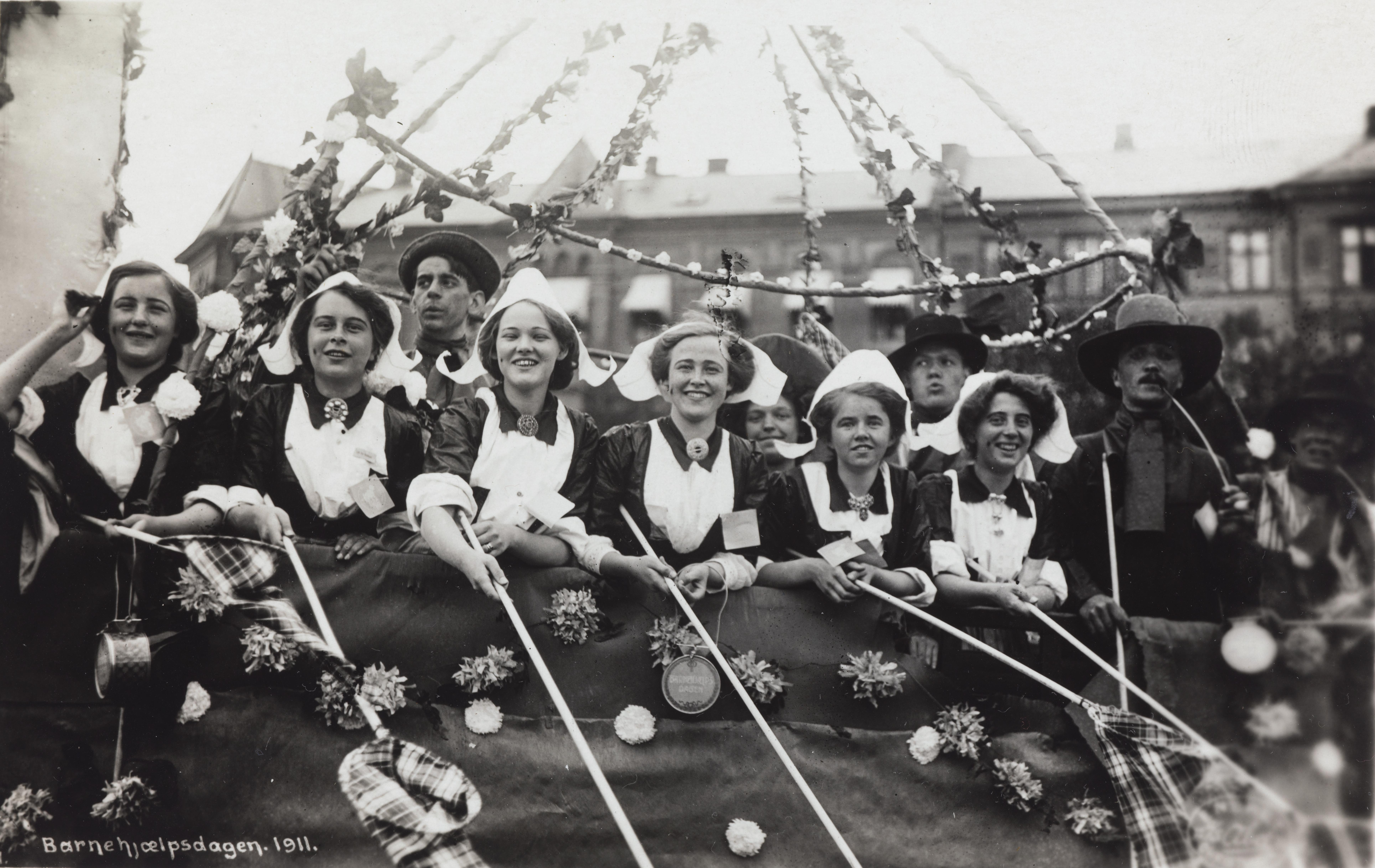
Children's Day in Norway, in 1911

Children's Day in Norway is held on 17 May, the same day as Norwegian Constitution Day, with many children's parades simultaneously celebrating both events and thereby emphasizing the importance of children in Norwegian society.

==== Poland ====
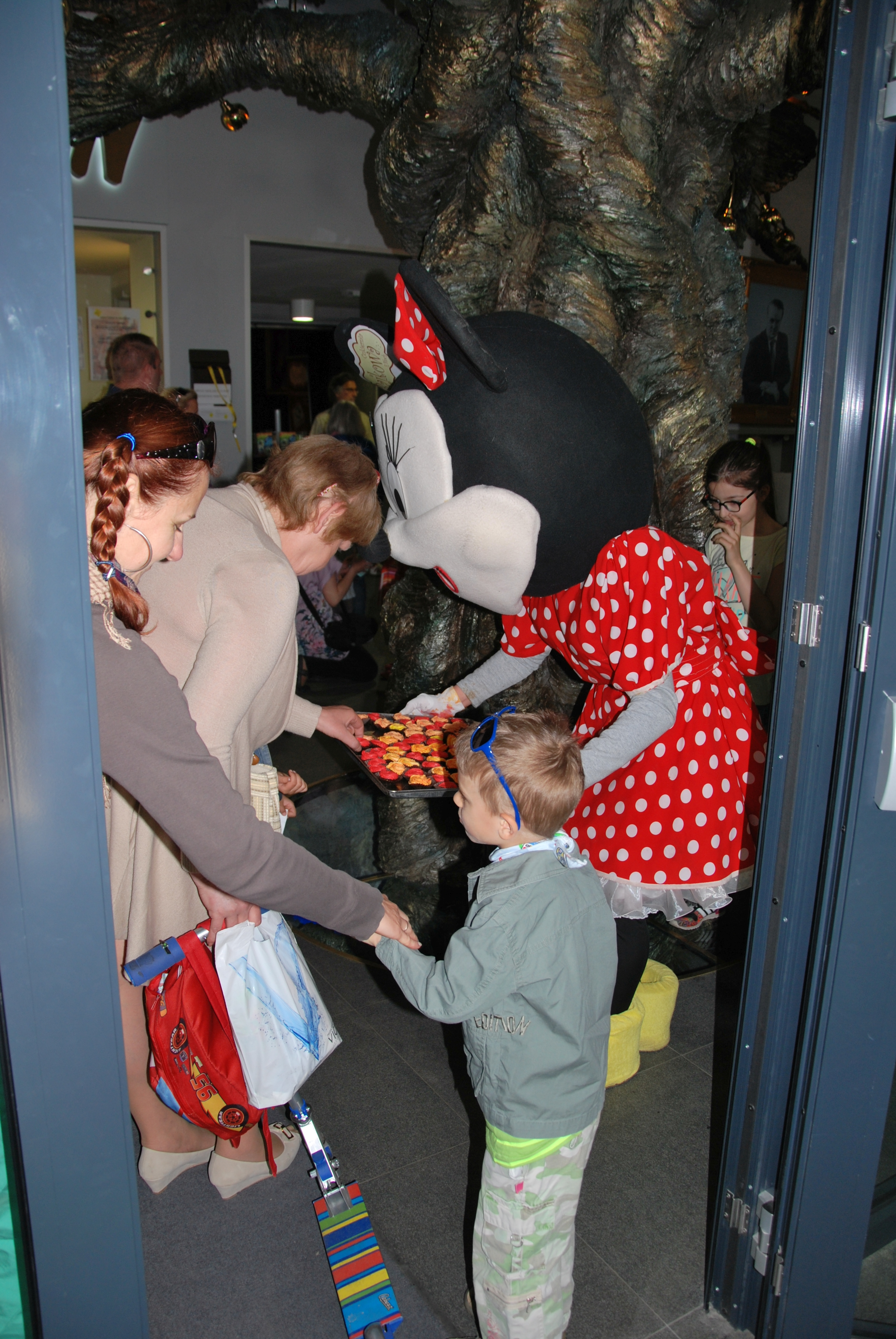
Children's Day at Arlekin Theatre, Łódź, 2015

In Poland, Children's Day (Dzień Dziecka) is celebrated on 1 June. The International Children's Day was introduced in Poland in 1952. It coincides with the beginning of meteorological summer and it is usually treated as a special day, free from lessons, as it takes place near the end of the school year. Schools usually organize special activities for the pupils to celebrate the day, and the first week of June is a time of festivities organized in parks and entertainment centers for children. It is a tradition that each child should receive a gift (or multiple smaller gifts and sweets) which drives up toys sales in that period considerably.

==== Portugal and some former colonies ====
In Portugal (and also at some of its former Asiatic and African colonies such as Guinea-Bissau, Macau, Cape Verde, East Timor, Angola, Mozambique and São Tomé and Príncipe), Children's Day (Dia da Criança) is celebrated on 1 June.

==== Romania ====
In Romania, Children's Day (Romanian: "Ziua Copilului") is celebrated on 1 June. Children often receive presents from parents and other family members. Various events are also organized.

According to the Law 220/2016, starting with 2017, Children's Day is officially a public holiday.

==== Russia ====
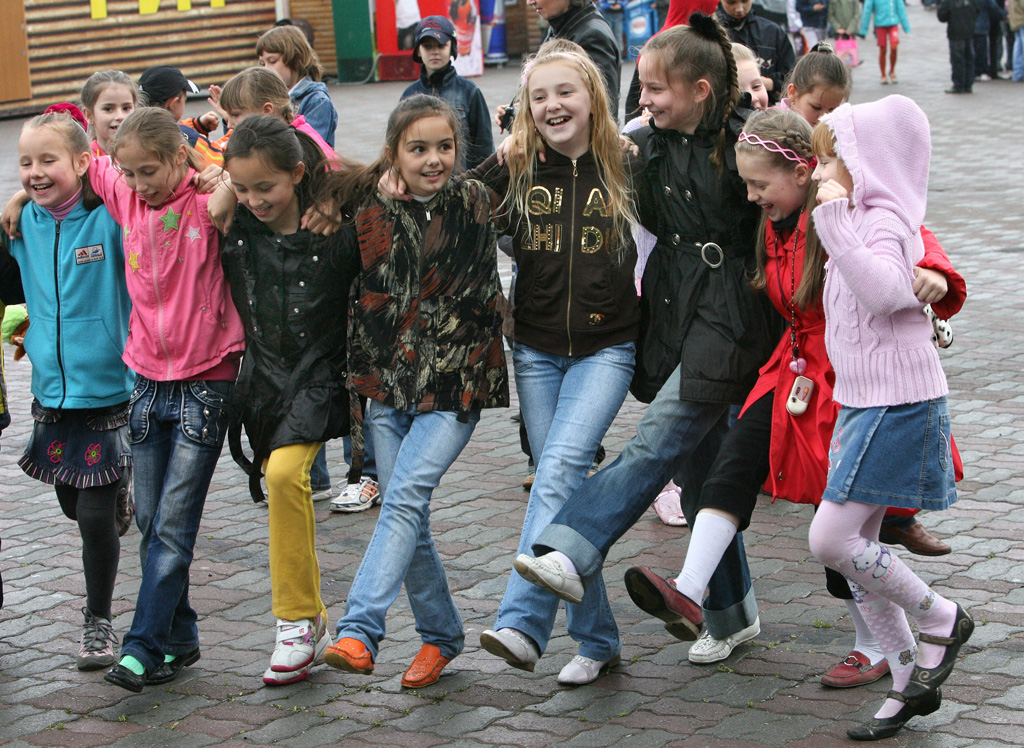
Children of Vladivostok, Russian Federation celebrating the International Children's Day

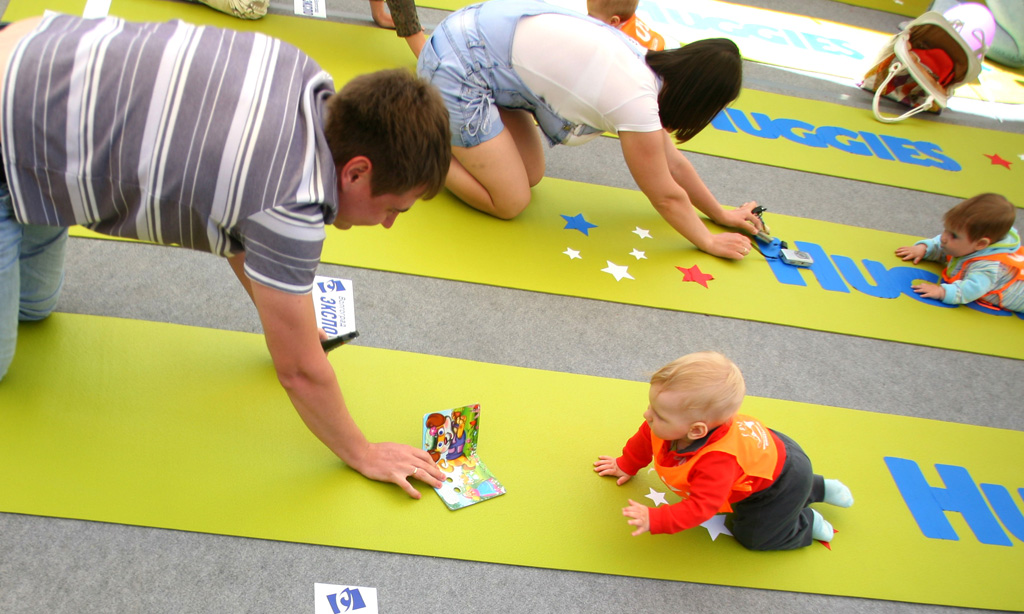
Participants compete at the baby crawling contest held in Volgograd ahead of International Children's Day, 2011.

In Russia, Children's Day is celebrated on 1 June. It was established as a holiday in 1949.

==== Serbia ====
In Serbia Children's Day is celebrated on 20 November, since 1989.

==== Slovakia ====
In Slovakia, the day is called International Children's Day (Medzinárodný deň detí) and is celebrated on 1 June. Children get free entrance to some attractions like zoos.

==== Spain ====
In Spain, this date is celebrated 15 April, and it is called "Día del niño".

==== Sweden ====
In Sweden, Children's Day is celebrated on the first Monday of October. It was Gustav Rosén who is credited with starting a Children's Day in Umeå in northern Sweden in 1905.

==== Switzerland ====
In Switzerland, Children's day was established as a holiday on 20 November 1925.

==== Ukraine ====
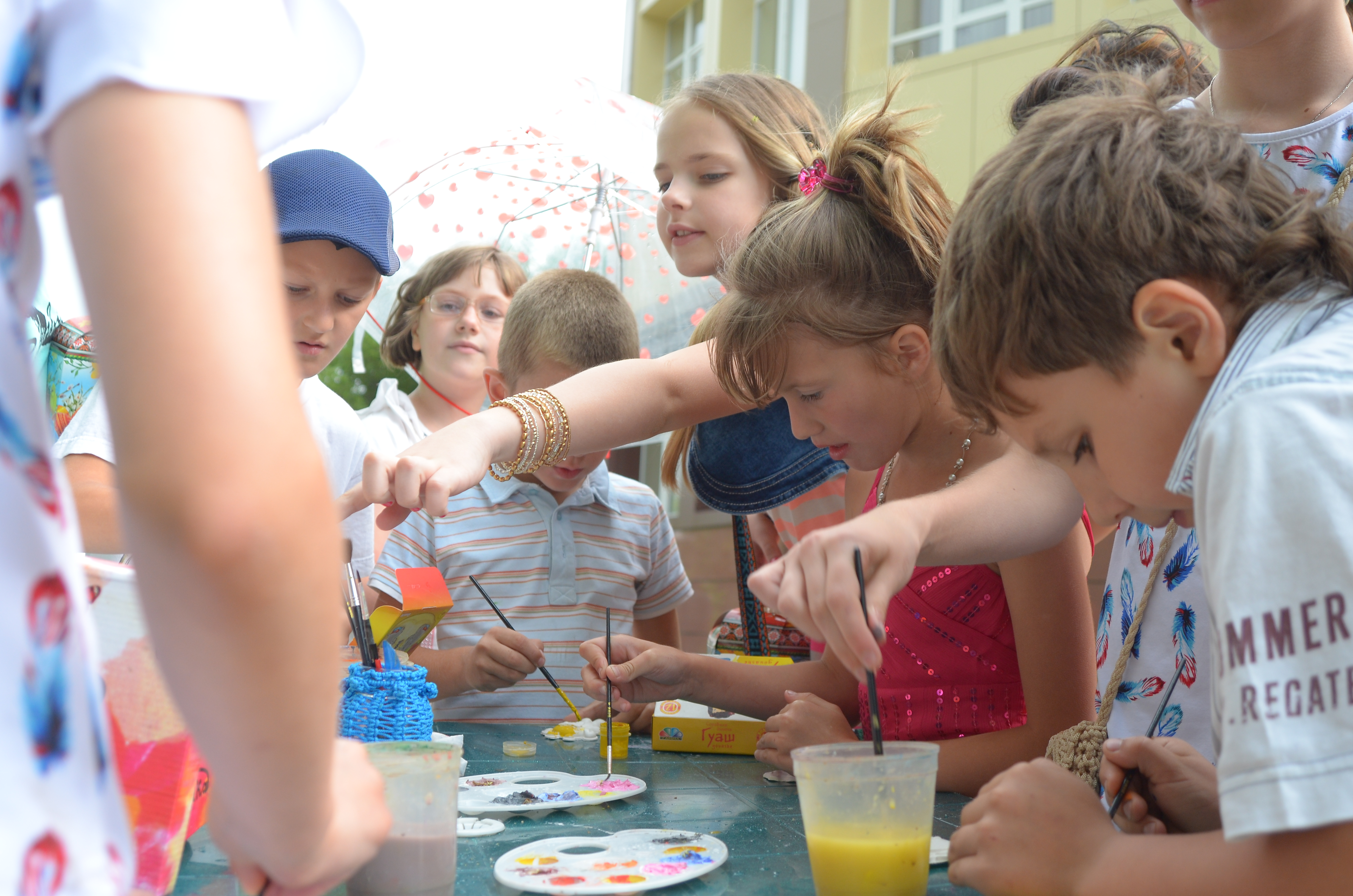
Children's Day in Donetsk, in 2013

Day of Children's Protection (Children's Day) (Ukrainian: День захисту дітей, romanized: Den zakhystu ditey, lit. 'day of children's protection') was celebrated on 1 June. In Ukraine, Children's Day was set in accordance with the presidential decree of Ukraine from 30 May 1998 No. 568/98.

From 2025, this Day is celebrated on November 20, as amended by the presidential decree.

==== United Kingdom ====
Children's Day was established in the United Kingdom in 1954 by the United Nations General Assembly, so as to create "a day of worldwide fraternity and understanding between children". However, Children's Day in the UK is not celebrated on the United Nations' nominated date of 20 November. "National Children's Day" is celebrated in the summer instead to allow children the chance to go outside on the day they are celebrated. In 2022, it was celebrated on Sunday 15 May.

==== Vatican ====
From 25 to 26 May 2024, the Vatican celebrated its first ever World's Children's Day festival, first in Rome's Olympic Stadium and then the next day in Saint Peter's Square. Pope Francis afterwards announced that the next Vatican World Children's Day would not be held until September 2026.

=== North America ===
==== Canada ====
National Child Day has been proclaimed across Canada since 1993 to commemorate the United Nations' adoption of two documents centered on children's rights: the United Nations Declaration of the Rights of the Child on 20 November 1959, and the United Nations Convention on the Rights of the Child on 20 November 1989. The "Child Day Act" outlines human rights to which children, under the age of 18, are entitled by law. This Act promotes awareness and teaches children that they have rights, like adults do, under the law. The date of celebration is 20 November.

==== Costa Rica ====
In Costa Rica, Children's Day is celebrated on 9 September.

==== Cuba ====
In Cuba, Children's Day is celebrated on June 1 and on the third Sunday of July.

==== Guatemala ====
In Guatemala, Children's Day is celebrated on 1 October. It was established as a holiday around 1990.

==== Haiti ====
In Haiti, Children's Day is celebrated on 12 June.

==== Honduras ====
In Honduras, Children's Day is celebrated on 10 September.

==== Mexico ====
In Mexico, Children's Day ("Día del niño") is celebrated on 30 April. On this day (or the closest weekday if it falls upon a weekend), teachers in schools organize the day for their children, including games, music, and sharing food. Often children make and break piñatas. In some schools, lessons are suspended for the day. Some families also have a day out with their children. There are special activities for children in parks and sports centers. Sometimes children are given presents by their families. In the media industry, it is celebrated as a de facto Take Your Children to Work Day, with the children of radio and television hosts appearing on their parents' shows, which are often themed with children's entertainment for the day.

The first Children's Day was celebrated in Tantoyuca, Veracruz on 8 May (year unknown), but in 1925 President Álvaro Obregón changed it after the country joined the Geneva Conventions and looking after the wellness of the vulnerable children affected by World War I. Later, the Geneva Declaration of the Rights of the Child was adopted on 26 November 1924 by the League of Nations recognizing that children are the most affected by war events.

United Nations recommended 20 November to celebrate Children's Day throughout the world, but that day coincides with Revolution Day (Mexico). Also, 30 April was selected to avoid 1 May (Labor Day) and the celebrations of Cinco de Mayo (The Day of the Battle of Puebla).

==== Nicaragua ====
In Nicaragua the International Children's Day is celebrated on 1 June.

==== Panama ====
In Panama, Children's Day or Kid's Day was formerly held on 1 November, but was changed by Vivian Fernandez de Torrijos, the wife of President Martin Torrijos (2004–2009), to the third Sunday of July.

==== Trinidad and Tobago ====
International Men's Day on 19 November and celebrates Children's Day on 20 November in Trinidad and Tobago.

==== United States ====
Children's Day observations in the United States predate both Mother's and Father's Day, though a permanent annual single Children's Day observation is not made at the national level. National Children's Day is generally celebrated in June or October, but other days are celebrated as well.

===== National Children/Child's Day =====
National Children's Day was celebrated on the second Sunday of October under the Bush and Clinton administration starting on 8 October 1989. The only exception was in 1993 when it switched to 21 November.

In 2001, Congress declared that National Child's Day is to be celebrated on the first Sunday of June, which the Bush administration followed except in 2002, when it was postponed to the second Sunday of June.

The Obama administration continued to celebrate "National Child's Day", but switched the date to 20 November, which does not always fall on a Sunday. An exception was made in 2009, when it was celebrated on Sunday, 22 November.

===== Celebrations in April =====
In 1996, author Pat Mora, after learning about the annual Mexican tradition of celebrating 30 April as El día del niño, the Day of the Child, proposed an annual celebration in the U.S. of El día de los niños, El día de los libros/Children's Day, Book Day, thus honoring children and connecting them to literacy, essential in a democracy. Assistance starting this community-based, family literacy initiative was provided by REFORMA, the National Association to Promote Library & Information Services to Latinos and the Spanish Speaking. Often known as Día, because it is both a daily commitment and an annual April celebration, Children's Day, Book Day, has grown to link all children to books, languages, and cultures. A major partner is the Association for Library Services to Children (ALSC), a division of the American Library Association (ALA). Every year, across the country, hundreds of libraries, schools, and community organizations, etc. hold culminating April Children's Day, Book Day celebrations that unite communities, creating an annual tradition much like Mother's Day and Father's Day.

On 23 April 2011, Executive of King County, WA declared 23 April as the International Children's Day.

Children's Day celebrations of Turkish Community in California lead to the State of California recognizing the last Saturday of April as the Children's Day.

On 11 April 2024, City of Mountlake Terrace, WA declared 23 April as the Children's Day.

===== Second Sunday in June =====
In 1856, Rev. Charles H. Leonard, D.D., then pastor of the First Universalist Church of Chelsea, Mass., set apart a Sunday for the dedication of children to the Christian life, and for the re-dedication of parents and guardians to bringing-up their children in Christian nurture. This service was first observed the second Sunday in June. The Universalist Convention at Baltimore in September 1867, passed a resolution commending churches to set apart one Sunday in each year as Children's Day. The Methodist Episcopal Church at the Methodist Conference of 1868 recommended that second Sunday in June be annually observed as Children's Day. The General Assembly of the Presbyterian Church in 1883 designated "the second Sabbath in June as Children's Day." Also in 1883, the National Council of Congregational Churches and nearly all the state bodies of that denomination in the United States passed resolutions commending the observance of the day. About this time many other denominations adopted similar recommendations.

Chase's Calendar of Events cites Children's Sunday and notes that The Commonwealth of Massachusetts issues an annual proclamation for the second Sunday in June. Since 2009, Illinois Governor Pat Quinn has issued proclamations proclaiming the second Sunday in June as Children's Day as had the previous governor in 2007 and 2008. The mayors of Aurora and Batavia, Illinois, also have issued proclamations. Numerous churches and denominations currently observe the second Sunday in June including the African Methodist Episcopal Church, African Methodist Episcopal Zion Church, and the Christian Methodist Episcopal Church.

=== South America ===
==== Argentina ====
Children's Day (in Spanish "Día del Niño") in Argentina it has been historically celebrated on the second Sunday of August, however in 2013 it changed to the third as the second interfered with the country's primary elections. It is usual for kids to get toys and other gift from their parents/families and people usually gather and share meals together. It has been celebrated on this date continuously since the 1960s but it earned meaning in 1990 when around the same date the country adopted the "Children Rights Convention" under the law N° 23.849.

==== Bolivia ====
Children's day in Bolivia was first established in 1954. Google made a Google Doodle celebrating this holiday on 13 April 2019. Although the holiday is celebrated on 12 April, not the 13th.

==== Brazil ====
In Brazil, Children's Day (In Portuguese: Dia das Crianças) is celebrated on 12 October, coinciding with Our Lady of Aparecida's day, the country's Patron Saint holiday. In Brazil, Children's Day is celebrated by kids receiving presents from their parents and relatives.

==== Chile ====
In Chile, Children's Day is officially recognized and assigned to the first Wednesday of October. However, it is observed on the second Sunday of August. It retains none of the international flavors as a day to recognize the needs of or rights of children but is observed merely as a commercial holiday dedicated to buying toys for children.

==== Colombia ====
In Colombia, Children's Day is celebrated on the last Saturday of April. It was established as a holiday in 2001.

==== Ecuador ====
In Ecuador, Children's Day (Día del Niño) is celebrated on 1 June. Generally, kids up to 12 years old receive presents.

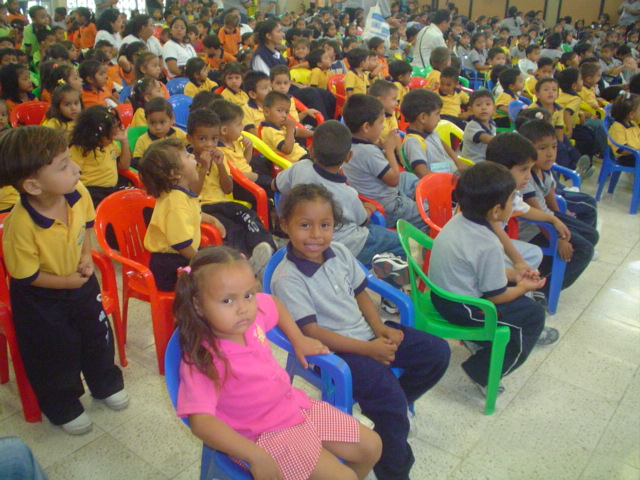
Children's day (Día del Niño) in Ecuador

==== Paraguay ====
In Paraguay, Children's Day is celebrated on 16 August, day of the Battle of Acosta Ñu, where it is said that 20,000 men from the Triple Alliance were awaited by a Paraguayan force made up of 3,500 children ages six to fifteen, ordered to hold the Alliance forces while the president Solano Lopez could escape. Even though Paraguay had been already completely defeated, it is said that Lopez forced them to stay and face the enemy; others sources claim that the children volunteered to fight against the Allied forces after their families had been killed by the advancing allied forces (see more in Paraguayan War). Since 1948, Children's Day has been a national holiday, used to remember the event, which happened during the five-year war.

==== Peru ====
According to Peruvian law in Peru, Children's Day (Día del Niño Peruano (Ley Nº 27666) , literally Peruvian Child's Day (Law Nº 27666)) is celebrated every second Sunday of April. There is a second celebration every third Sunday of August promoted as the "International Children's Day". On this day of the year, Peruvian children would typically be congratulated and would receive presents from their parents. Since it is celebrated on Sunday, all special activities in school, such as field trips and the like are done the previous Friday. All major stores offer special discounts on toys, appliances, electronics, clothes, etc.

==== Suriname ====
In Suriname, Children's Day or Kinderdag is celebrated on 5 December. Generally, children up to 12 years old receive presents from their parents.

==== Uruguay ====
Children's Day in Uruguay is the second Sunday in August. 6 January is Epiphany (Reyes), also celebrated as Children's day.

==== Venezuela ====
In Venezuela, Children's Day is celebrated the third Sunday of July.

=== Oceania ===
==== Australia ====
Children's Week is an annual event celebrated in Australia during the fourth week in October, from the Saturday before Universal Children's Day to the following Sunday. Prior to 1977, Child Care Week was held in various Australian states and territories focusing on children in care or those in institutions. This event was held at different times throughout the year. In 1984, it was decided to coordinate a national week to include all children to align with Universal Children's Day. In 1996 it was decided to adopt a permanent theme, "A Caring World Shares", to celebrate the right of children to enjoy childhood. Organised events allow children to demonstrate their talents, skills and abilities.

National Aboriginal and Torres Strait Islander Children's Day in Australia has been held each year, since 1988, on 4 August. This event was initially held against the backdrop of bicentennial year protests that obscured the importance of indigenous children. The 4 August had historically been the date Stolen Generation Aboriginal and Torres Strait Islander children who had been separated from their families without knowledge of their true birth dates would celebrate their birthday. Today, the day brings Elders, families and their children together to celebrate the strengths of First Nation's children and learn about the crucial impact that culture, family and community play in the life of every Aboriginal and Torres Strait Islander child.

==== New Zealand ====
In New Zealand, Children's Day is typically celebrated on the first Sunday in March. It honors children as a taonga (Maori for treasure), and is a day family can relax and share in activities to honor their children. In 2012, the focus was on peace and aroha (Maori for 'love'). The New Zealand Government has recognized this as one of the most important issues for New Zealanders, with an event such as Children's Day helping to focus on the practice of sharing, loving and caring as well as honoring tamariki (Maori for 'children').

==== Tuvalu ====
The first Monday in August is National Children's Day in Tuvalu. This public holiday is called in Tuvalu Aso Tamaliki.

==== Vanuatu ====
In Vanuatu, Children's Day is celebrated on 24 July. The two main themes of the holiday are "Stop violence against children" and "Give a child the chance to express their opinion today". After the march, there are speeches and activities organized by schools, including a dance. Then, after midday, children return home to spend time with their parents for the rest of the day. Children's Day is a public holiday, set up following a recommendation of the committee on the Rights of the Child. A group of people in the United Nations monitor and protect children's rights. A committee, with both adult and child members, organizes activities. In the past, a committee of adults has chosen the theme – but in the future children may help choose it.

Children's Day originally took place only in the capital of Vanuatu, but it has now been extended to all 6 provinces. Schools, churches, local governments of the provinces and other local organizations all organize activities. Save the Children supports one Children's Day activity in each province, selecting it from the many requests they receive for support. In 2008, one of the activities supported by Save the Children was a sports day between many different schools.

Parents and caretakers have been supportive of Children's Day activities. Many parents come to activities with children. In one province, children and parents from five different schools came together for a shared lunch. Some parents give their children presents for Children's Day – however, Save the Children try to spread the message that it doesn't matter if a parent can't afford to buy their child a present, as the real aim of Children's Day is for parents and children to spend the day together, and work together to reconcile their problems.

== See also ==
- National Sovereignty and Children's Day
- Convention on the Rights of the Child
- Street children
- World Youth Day
