= Bang Jeong-hwan =

Korean children's rights activist (1899–1931)

Bang Jeong-hwan 방정환
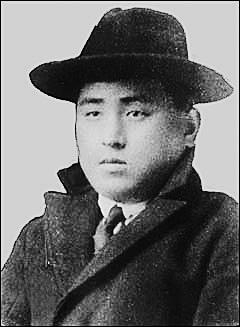
- Born: Bang Jeong-hwan; November 9, 1899; Seoul, Korean Empire
- Died: July 23, 1931 (aged 31); Keijō, Korea, Empire of Japan
- Writing career
- Pen name: Janmul, Geumpari, Ssang S, Mulmangcho, Mokseong, Bukgeukseong, Mongjungin, Monggyeoncho, Sopa
- Language: Korean

- Bang Jeong-hwan
- Hangul: 방정환
- Hanja: 方定煥
- RR: Bang Jeonghwan
- MR: Pang Chŏnghwan

Bang Jeong-hwan (Korean: 방정환; November 9, 1899 – July 23, 1931) was a pioneer of Korean juvenile literature and a children's rights activist, who led the establishment of Children's Day (Korean: 어린이날) in Korea.

== Life ==
Bang Jeong-hwan was born November 9, 1899, in Seoul, Korea. Bang graduated from Posung school and studied Child Psychology and Children's Literature at Tokyo College in Japan. Bang died from kidney failure on July 23, 1931.

== Work ==
The Literature Translation Institute of Korea sums Bang's career up:

Bang Jeong-hwan was the father of children’s literature in Korea. He started the children’s literary magazine Eorini, which remained in print from 1923 to 1934, and helped establish children’s literature stories, songs and plays for children as a distinct genre. Original stories, adaptations and translations Bang contributed to the magazine reveal his intimate awareness of the ways in which economic difficulties of life can affect children and corrupt their innocence; rich with lessons, these works reinforce the view that the good will ultimately triumph over evil and seek to restore the purity of childhood. In addition to such literary endeavors, Bang Jeonghwan continually sought ways to improve children’s life both culturally and materially. He organized theater festivals and public readings as part of the larger cultural movement for children and was instrumental in instituting Children’s Day in Korea, first observed on May 1, 1922. He also started a number of organizations for children, including Cheondogyo Children’s Association (Cheondogyo sonyeonhoe) and The Rainbow Society (Saekdonghoe). Along with Kim Gijeon and Lee Jeongho, Bang Jeonghwan is considered an early champion of children’s rights in Korea.

== Tribute ==
On November 9, 2016, Google celebrated his 117th birthday with a Google Doodle.
