= National Sovereignty and Children's Day =

Public holiday in Turkey

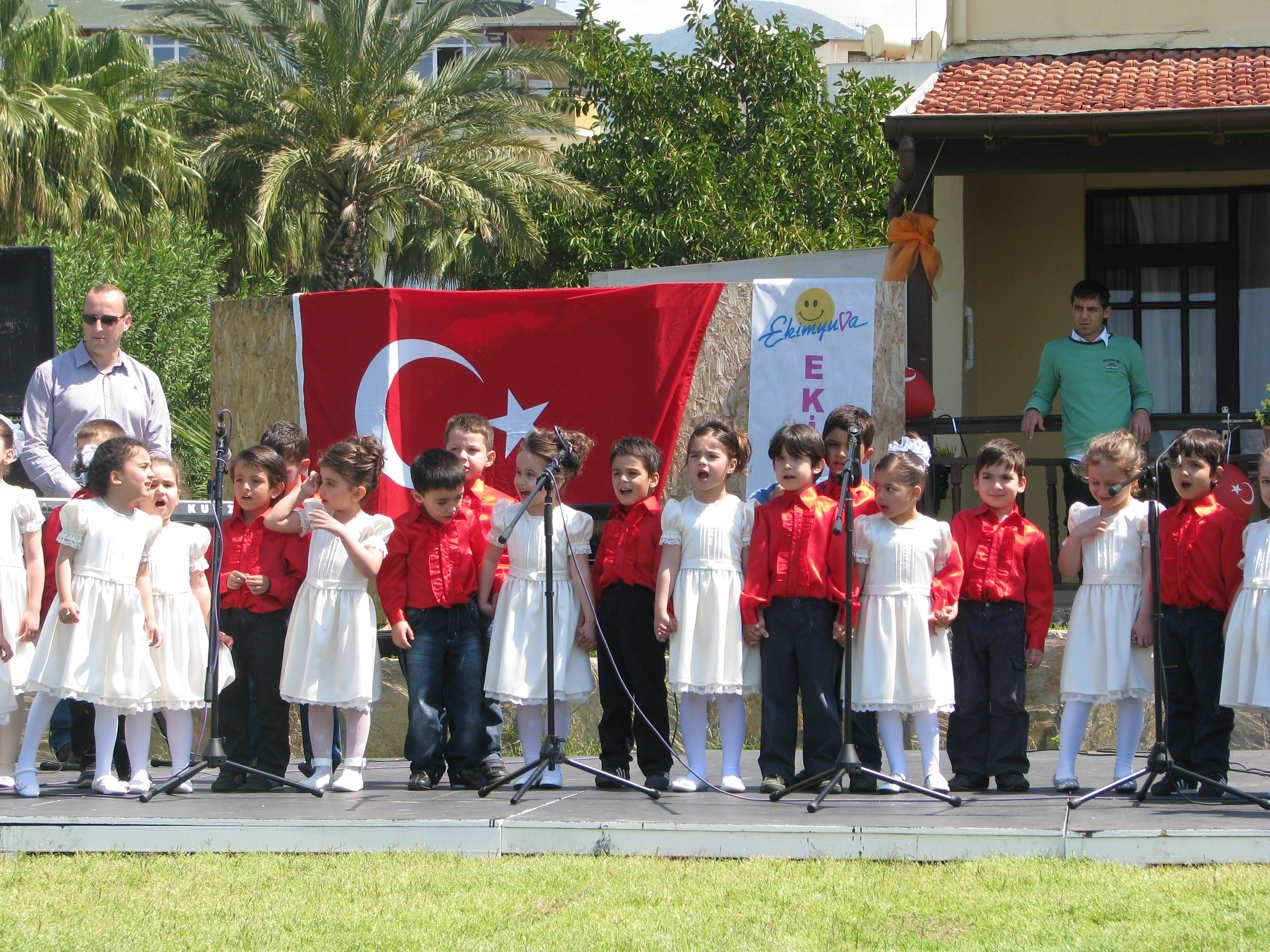
- Events at schools take place across Turkey on Children's Day.
- Official name: Ulusal Egemenlik ve Çocuk Bayramı (Turkish)
- Also called: The Twenty-third of April
- Observed by: Turkey; Northern Cyprus
- Type: National
- Significance: The day in 1920 that the Grand National Assembly of Turkey was founded
- Celebrations: Concerts, parades, events at schools, cultural programmes
- Date: 23 April
- Next time: 23 April 2027
- Frequency: annual

National Sovereignty and Children's Day (Turkish: Ulusal Egemenlik ve Çocuk Bayramı) is a public holiday in Turkey and Northern Cyprus commemorating the foundation of the Grand National Assembly of Turkey, on 23 April 1920.

== Background ==
23 April is the day that the Grand National Assembly of Turkey was founded in 1920. The national council denounced the government of the Ottoman Sultan Mehmed VI and announced a temporary constitution. During the War of Independence, the Grand National Assembly met in Ankara and laid down the foundations of a new, independent, secular and modern republic from the ashes of the Ottoman Empire. Following the defeat of the Allied invasion forces on September 9, 1922 and the signing of the Treaty of Lausanne on July 24, 1923, the Turkish Government started the task of establishing the institutions of a state.

23 April was declared "National Sovereignty Day" on May 2, 1921. Since 1927, the holiday has also been celebrated as Children's Day. Thus, Turkey became the first country to officially declare Children's Day a national holiday. In 1981, the holiday was officially named "National Sovereignty and Children's Day".

== Countries where it is celebrated ==
23 April is celebrated as National Sovereignty and Children's Day in Turkey and Northern Cyprus. The Kosovar Turks in the Republic of Kosovo use the day as "Kosovar Turk Day". After Kosovo declared independence in 2008, the government let all ethnicities in the nation pick a day and celebrate it for their ethnic groups and 23 April got picked for the Kosovar Turks. Since 23 April 2009, it is a national holiday.

== Customs ==
Every year, children in Turkey celebrate National Sovereignty and Children's Day as a national holiday. Similar to other April events, Children's Day celebrations are often held outdoors. Schools participate in week-long ceremonies marked by performances in all fields in large stadiums watched by the entire nation. Students decorate their classrooms with flags, balloons and handmade ornaments. Anıtkabir is visited by children and politicians every year. Among the activities on this day, the children send their representatives to replace state officials and high ranking civil servants in their offices. The President, the cabinet ministers, provincial governors, and mayors all turn over their positions to children's representatives in a purely ceremonial exercise. On this day, children also replace the parliamentarians in the Grand National Assembly and hold a ceremonial special session to discuss matters concerning children's issues.

After UNESCO proclaimed 1979 as the International Year of the Child, the Turkish Radio and Television Corporation (TRT) organized the first TRT International April 23 Children's Festival. Five countries participated in this first holiday. Over the years, this number grew steadily, resulting in children from about 50 countries coming to Turkey in an official ceremony every year to participate in the festival. During the time, children stay with Turkish families and interact with the Turkish children and learn about each other's countries and cultures. Foreign children also participate in the ceremonial session of the Grand National Assembly.

== Celebration gallery ==
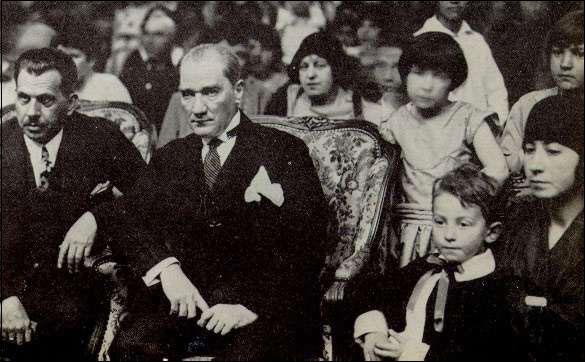
Mustafa Kemal Atatürk (mid) in Ankara on the "Day of National Sovereignty", present-day the "National Sovereignty and Children's Day" (1929)

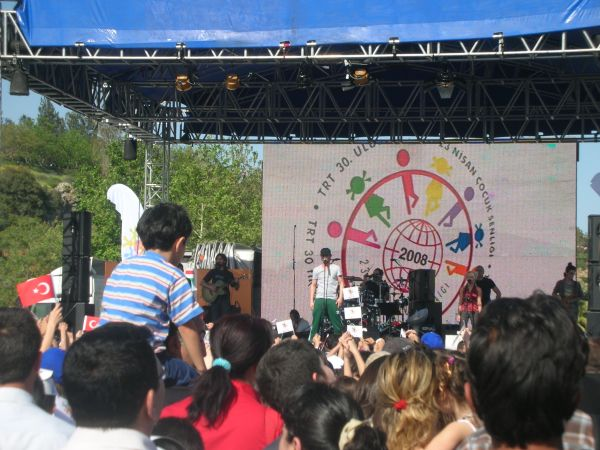
Murat Boz performing on stage as part of the TRT International April 23 Children's Festival (2008)

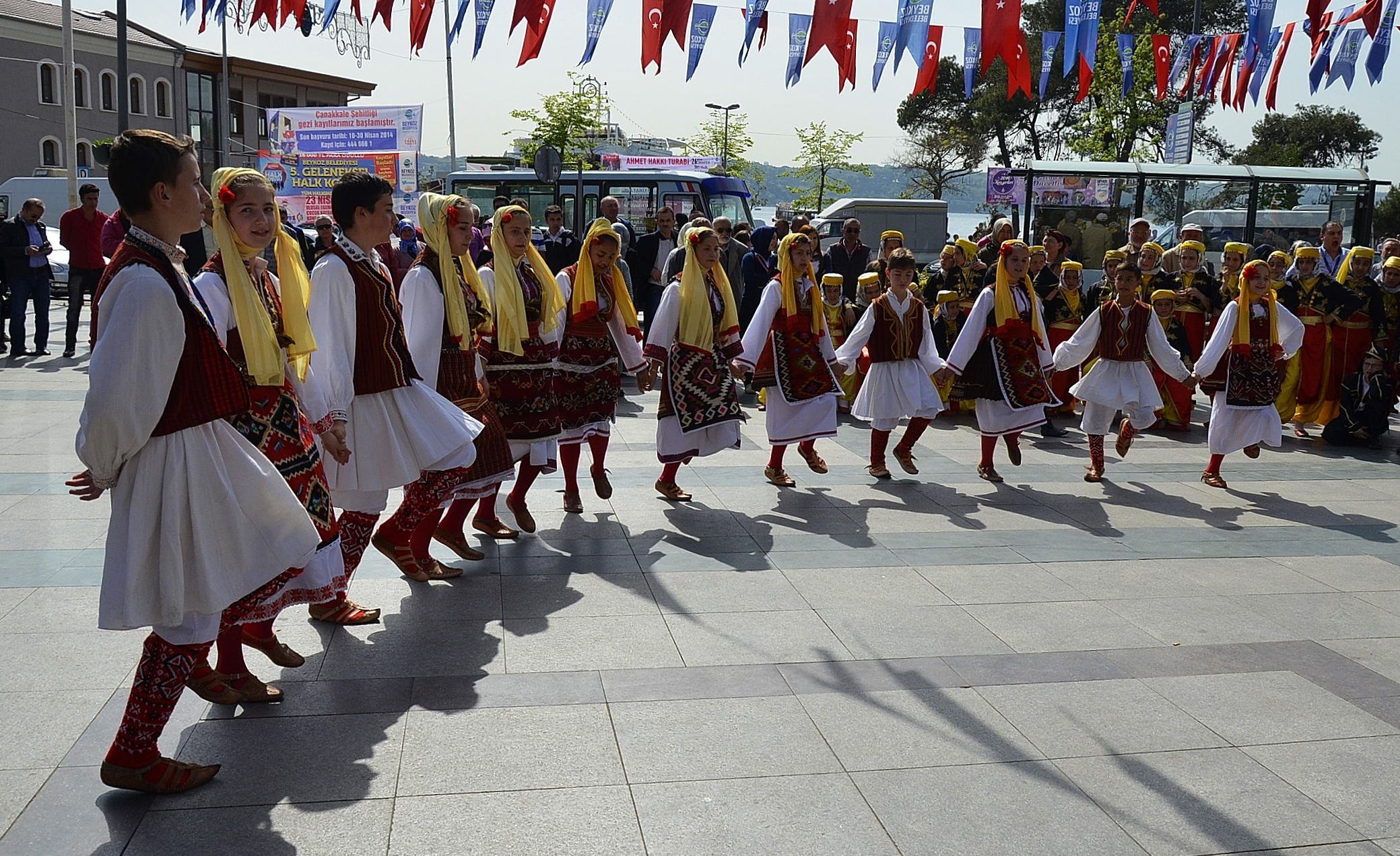
Children from North Macedonia performing folk dance on the street in Istanbul (2014)
