= Zubir Said =

Singaporean composer of the national anthem (1907–1987)

Tuan Yang Terutama Tuan Haji Zubir bin Said SK, BBM, JS, SKA, SBA, ACCA, COMPASS; (Lifetime Achievement Award)
- Zubir in 1967

Background information
- Born: Zubir Said; 22 July 1907; Fort De Kock, Dutch East Indies (now Bukittinggi, West Sumatera, Indonesia)
- Died: 16 November 1987 (aged 80) Chiku Road, Joo Chiat Place, Singapore
- Genres: Film scores and songs
- Occupation: Composer
- Years active: 1907–1987
- Label: Universal Music Group

Zubir bin Said SK BBM (/sɑːˈeɪd/ sah-AYD; 22 July 1907 – 16 November 1987) was a Singaporean composer most notable for composing the national anthem of his country, "Majulah Singapura" – "Onward Singapore".

A self-taught musician, Zubir also worked as a score arranger and songwriter for Cathay Organisation's Keris Film Productions for 12 years, composing numerous songs for the company's Malay Singaporean films. He is believed to have written up to 1,500 songs, with less than 10% of them ever recorded.

== Early years ==
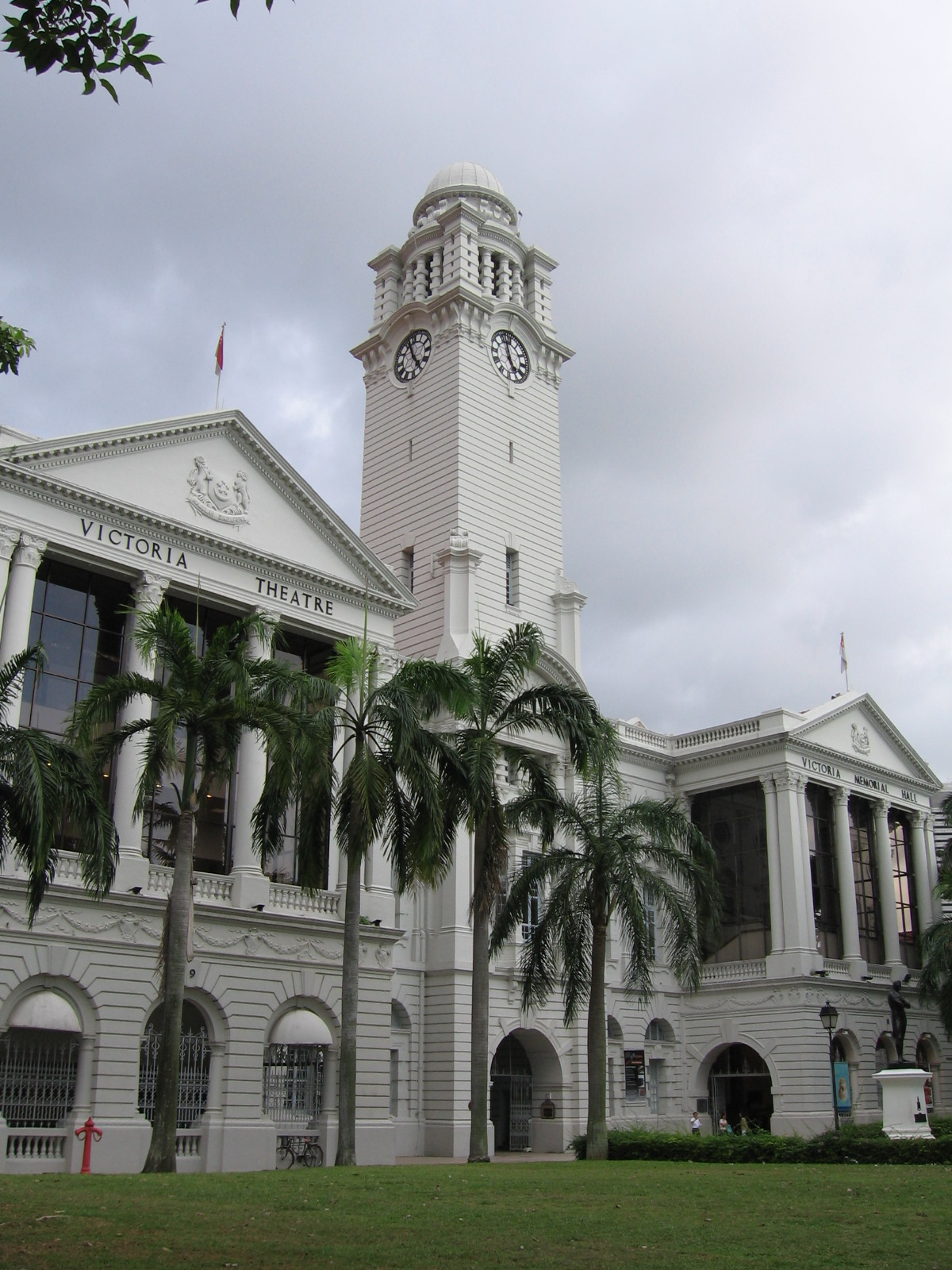
The Victoria Theatre and Concert Hall as it appeared in January 2006. Victoria Theatre was the venue for the first public performance of Zubir Said's compositions, including "Majulah Singapura" on 6 September 1958. The song later became independent Singapore's national anthem.

The eldest child in a family of three boys and five girls, Zubir was born on 22 July 1907 in Bukit Tinggi, Minangkabau, Sumatra, Indonesia. His mother died when he was seven years old. He attended a Dutch school but had no interest in academic studies. His involvement with music started when he was introduced to the Solfa music system by a teacher. A primary-school classmate subsequently taught him how to make and play a flute, and in middle school, he learned to play the guitar and drums from fellow students and the keroncong group he was involved in.

== Move to Singapore ==
In 1928 at the age of 21, Zubir went to Singapore to make a living as a musician, taking up the suggestion of a sailor friend who had described the island as a place of "glittering lights, seller [coffee with milk] and butter". This was done in the face of objections from his village chieftain father, Mohamad Said bin Sanang, who believed music to be against religion. Zubir's first job was as a musician with City Opera, a bangsawan or Malay opera troupe based in Tanjong Pagar. He became the troupe's bandleader. Thereafter, in 1936, he joined the recording company His Master's Voice. Zubir went to Java to marry Tarminah Kario Wikromo, a keroncong singer, in 1938; they returned to Zubir's home town of Bukittinggi in 1941 just before the outbreak of World War II.

Coming back to Singapore in 1947, Zubir worked as a part-time photographer with the Utusan Melayu newspaper while composing and performing music and songs. In 1949 he took up the post of orchestra conductor at Shaw Brothers' Malay Film Production, and in 1952 he joined Cathay-Keris Film Productions as a score arranger and songwriter for the company's Malay films, including Sumpah Pontianak (Blood of Pontianak, 1958) and Chuchu Datuk Merah (Grandchildren of Datuk Merah, 1963). In 1957, he received his first public recognition when his songs were performed at the Victoria Theatre.

== "Majulah Singapura" ==
Singapore, then a British colony, had been conferred city status by a royal charter from King George VI in 1951. In 1958, the City Council of Singapore approached Zubir to compose a song for the city to be titled "Majulah Singapura", which was a motto to be displayed in the Victoria Theatre after its renovation. Zubir's song, "Majulah Singapura" ("Onward Singapore"), was first performed by the Singapore Chamber Ensemble during the grand finale of a concert staged in the Victoria Theatre on 6 September 1958 to celebrate its official reopening. When Singapore attained self-government in 1959, the Government felt that a national anthem was needed to unite the different races in Singapore.

It decided that the City Council's song, which was already popular, would serve this purpose. After some revisions were made to the song, it was adopted by the Legislative Assembly on 11 November 1959, and on 30 November the Singapore State Arms and Flag and National Anthem Ordinance 1959 was passed. This statute regulated the use and display of the State Arms and State Flag and the performance of the National Anthem. "Majulah Singapura" was presented to the nation on 3 December at the launch of "Loyalty Week", replacing the colonial anthem "God Save the Queen". After Singapore's full independence from Malaysia on 9 August 1965, "Majulah Singapura" was formally adopted as the Republic's national anthem. In a 1984 oral history interview, to sum up his philosophy when composing the anthem, Zubir cited the Malay proverb "Di mana bumi dipijak, di situ langit dijunjung" ("You should hold up the sky of the land where you live").

== Later years ==
In 1962, Zubir's songs for the movie Dang Anom won an award at the ninth Asian Film Festival in Seoul, South Korea.

He also gave music lessons, and often had other music artists visiting him to talk about music and asking for advice. His third and youngest daughter Puan Sri Dr. Rohana Zubir, a retired lecturer with the University of Malaya, recalled how the family home in Singapore was always filled with music. He was the heart of the conversation, very enthused and willing to share pearls of wisdom so that others could benefit from his work. This generosity extended to other areas of his life. He helped his own family in Sumatra and families in Singapore he had "adopted", sending them medicine and other items with what little he could afford, even though his own family was not well off at the time.

He was content with money earned from those lessons and his film compositions; affirming that he was never driven by money although essential for his own and family's survival, rather he valued honesty and sincerity in his work and placed importance on purity and originality, whether in his music, lyrics or style of singing. He continued working for Cathay-Keris Film Productions until he retired in 1964, composing numerous songs for Malay films. Some sources reported that he also stopped composing songs for Cathay out of objection to its management's decision to cut production costs by borrowing existing music to be used for dubbing onto the background music of some films at the time.

Zubir died at the age of 80 on 16 November 1987 at Joo Chiat Place in Singapore, survived by four daughters and a son. At the time of his death, Zubir left S$20,000 to his name. In 1990, his life and passion as a musician were documented in a book titled Zubir Said: His Songs, and in 2004 a S$69,000 bronze bust of a bespectacled Zubir was installed in Gallery 6 of the Malay Heritage Centre which pays tribute to icons in Singaporean Malay arts and culture.

== Awards and honours ==
Zubir receives dozens of awards and honours from in and outside of Singapore for his massive contributions to the Malay world in songs and music and to Singapore. Some of his awards and honours were not in the list below.

In recognition of his contributions to the State, Zubir was conferred the Sijil Kemuliaan (Certificate of Honour) on 16 March 1963 and the Bintang Bakti Masyarakat (Public Service Star) in the same year. In 1971, he received the Jasawan Seni (cultural medallion) award from eight Malay cultural organisations, and the Asean Cultural and Communications Award in 1987. He also received a Certificate of Commendation from the Amalgamated Union of Public Employees (AUPE) for composing the AUPE song. In 1995, Zubir was posthumously given a Lifetime Achievement Award by the Composers and Authors Society of Singapore (COMPASS).

On 8 May 2009, the Acting Minister for Information, Communications and the Arts, Lui Tuck Yew, announced that the address of the permanent campus for the School of the Arts (SOTA) near The Cathay will be 1 Zubir Said Drive, in honour of the late composer.

== Music ==
Zubir's piano (pictured in 2026) on display at the National Museum of Singapore

Zubir is estimated to have written about 1,500 songs, including those written for Cathay-Keris Film Productions' Malay films in the 1950s and 1960s; less than 10% of these songs were recorded. His compositions throughout his filmography were heavily influenced by Minangkabau music, his past involvement with the bangsawan scene as well as influences of Indian classical music and Malay irama asli. However, with the decline of Malay cinema in Singapore, he is primarily remembered by Singaporeans for several patriotic compositions: its national anthem, "Majulah Singapura" ("Onward Singapore"), and "Semoga Bahagia" ("May You Achieve Happiness"), a song aimed at primary-school students often sung in schools for Children's Day on 1 October plus during the Singapore Youth Festival.

He had also submitted three song compositions to the Malayan – later Malaysian – Government for consideration for their national anthem in 1956. However, the committee eventually decided upon selecting the state anthem of Perak (which was based upon the French songwriter Pierre-Jean de Béranger's "La Rosalie") to what would eventually became Malaysia's own "Negaraku".

On 22 August 2007, Zubir's family signed an agreement with Universal Music in Malaysia for the latter to manage his works while the copyright in the songs remains with his family. The idea to do so came after his daughter Dr. Rohana met Sandy Monteiro, senior ASEAN vice-president of the Universal Music Publishing Group in 2005 through Monteiro's wife, who was a good friend of hers. Dr. Rohana was reported as saying: "It is time to hand over the songs in order to revive them two decades after my father's passing. I hope to ensure that his songs continue to live in the hearts of young artists in Malaysia."

== Works ==
- Zubir Said (1965), Membacha Musik [Reading Music Scores], Singapore: Zubir Said (in Malay).

== See also ==
- List of Singaporean patriotic songs
