= List of British Residents of Negeri Sembilan =

This is a list of the British Residents of the Malay State of Negeri Sembilan, British Malaya. The position of Resident was an administrative post. Under the terms of the local agreements established during the formation of the Federated Malay States, the Resident served as an adviser to His Highness the Yang di Pertuan Besar of Negeri Sembilan, and his decisions were binding in all matters of administration except those related to Malay customs and religion.

The British Resident post in Negeri Sembilan functioned similarly to the role of today's Menteri Besar, where he chaired the State Council while the Yang di Pertuan Besar presided as the supreme authority of the council. The official residence of the Resident was located at the Negeri Sembilan Residency in Seremban, with additional administrative facilities situated throughout the district capitals.

After World War Two, the position of British Resident was replaced by that of British Adviser in 1955. Eventually, when Malaya achieved Independence, the British Adviser post was abolished.

No.	British Resident	Portrait	Honour	Entered office	Left office
1	Martin Lister		none	December 1889	1890
2	William Francis Bourne Paul		none	November 1890	1894
3	Robert Norman Bland		CMG	1894	1895
4	Martin Lister (second time)		none	1895	24 February 1897
5	Sir Ernest Woodford Birch		KCMG, CMG	24 February 1897	7 April 1901
6	Sir Henry Conway Belfield		KCMG, CMG, JP	8 April 1901	17 August 1902
7	Sir Walter Egerton		KCMG	18 August 1902	26 February 1904
8	Sir Frederick Aloysius Weld (acting to 26 February 1904)		GCMG	28 November 1903	19 May 1905
9	Douglas Graham Campbell		CMG	19 May 1905	31 December 1909
10	Sir Edward Lewis Brockman		KCMG	1 January 1910	31 January 1911
11	Sir Richard James Wilkinson		CMG	1 February 1911	24 April 1912
12	Arthur Henry Lemon		CMG	25 April 1912	2 September 1919
13	John Richard Oliver Aldworth		none	2 September 1919	21 May 1920
14	William James Parke Hume		none	22 May 1920	20 June 1920
15	Valentine Hill (acting to 12 February 1921)		none	29 June 1920	4 February 1922
16	Edward Shaw Hose (acting to 3 February 1922)		CMG	4 February 1922	17 July 1924
17	Ernest Charteris Holford Wolff		CMG	18 July 1924	8 June 1928
18	James William Simmons (acting to 8 June 1928)		KBE, CMG	8 April 1928	24 March 1932
19	John Whitehouse Ward Hughes (acting to 24 March 1932)		none	27 July 1931	1936
20	Gordon Lupton Ham		none	December 1936	1939
21	John Vincent Cowgill (first time)		CMG, GC	1939	14 January 1941
22	John Vincent Cowgill (second time)		CMG, GC	1945	1946
23	William Alexander Gordon-Hall		none	1946	May 1949
24	Hugh Patterson Bryson		none	May 1949	November 1950
25	Anthony Hyde		none	November 1950	30 September 1951
26	Tan Sri Dato' Mubin Sheppard		PSM, DPMS, JMN, CMG, MBE, OStJ	1 October 1951	31 July 1956
