= Robert Norman Bland =

British colonial civil servant

Robert Norman Bland CMG

Resident Councillor, Penang
- In office 1907–1910
- Preceded by: James Kortright Birch
- Succeeded by: James Oliver Anthonisz
- Majority: British

Personal details
- Born: 8 October 1859 Malta
- Died: 30 March 1948 (aged 88) Sussex, England
- Spouse: Laura Emily Shelford
- Relations: John Otway Percy Bland (brother)
- Children: 3
- Occupation: British Colonial Official

Robert Norman Bland CMG (8 October 1859 – 30 March 1948), or "R. N. Bland," as he was more commonly known then in The Straits, was Resident Councillor of Penang and a career civil servant in the Colonial Administration of the Straits Settlements.

Bland joined the Colonial Civil Service of the Straits Settlements as a Cadet in 1883, learning Chinese and Malay languages, and later Law, and spent 27 years working his way up the Civil Service ladder through various different roles and positions, often holding multiple positions at the same time, retiring in 1910 as Resident Councillor of Penang. Brief biographies are given of him in Twentieth Century Impressions of British Malaya One Hundred Years of Singapore, Who's Who in the Far East, Burke's Irish Family Records and other works. The ones from the first two, read:

"The Resident Councillor of Pinang: is the Hon. Mr. Robert Norman Bland, B.A. A son of Major-General Bland, R.E., he was born at Malta in 1859. He was educated at Cheltenham College and at Trinity College, Dublin, where he obtained the degree of B.A. in 1882.

Mr. Bland has had a long and varied career in the Straits Settlements Civil Service. Arriving in the colony early in 1883, he was attached to the Colonial Secretary's Office as a cadet learning Chinese, and in the following year he also qualified in Malay.

He has served as private secretary to the Acting Governor, Collector and Magistrate at Kuala Pilah in the Negri Sambilan, Assistant Resident Councillor at Pinang, Collector of Land Revenue at Pinang and Singapore, officer in charge of Sungei Ujong, Inspector of Prisons for the Straits Settlements, Colonial Treasurer and Collector of Stamp Duties, and Resident Councillor at Malacca.

In 1887 he was engaged in reporting upon a system of Mukim boundaries in Pinang and Province Wellesley.

He is ex-officio Chairman of the Pinang Committee of the Tanjong Pagar Board, of the District Hospital, of the Library, and of the Gardens Committee, Pinang; a trustee of St. George's Church and of St. George's Girls' School; and president of the Free School's Committee.

Mr. Bland raised and commanded a company of volunteers in Malacca.(1902-6).

He is a member of the Colonial Institute and of the Sports Club, London, and is enrolled either as a patron or member of all the local clubs. His recreations are golf and riding.

He married, in 1895, Laura Emily, eldest daughter of the late Mr. Thomas Shelford, C.M.G., head of the firm of Paterson, Simons Co., and for some twenty years member of the Legislative Council of the Straits Settlements. Mrs. Bland is a member of the Straits branch of the Royal Asiatic Society and of the Royal Anthropological Institute. She takes a keen interest in women's work amongst the Malays." "Mr. R. N. Bland, C.M.G. Mr. Robert Norman Bland was appointed a Cadet in the Straits service in 1882. He held various offices in the three Settlements, and was also in charge of Sungei Ujong and Jelebu from 1893 to 1895. He became Colonial Treasurer in 1904, and was successively Resident Councillor, Malacca, from 1904 to 1907, and of Penang from 1907 to 1910, when he retired. He became a C.M.G. in the latter year. He is the author of the illustrated work Historical Tombstones of Malacca, which has done much to preserve the records of monuments of the past, otherwise only too likely to perish, and he was a frequent contributor to the Royal Asiatic Society's Journal."

The sometimes contradictory accounts of the dates or periods he held these positions for, is due to two practices at that time. Firstly, holding multiple positions at the same time (a substantive role, together with other less substantive, temporary or acting roles). And second, being appointed to a role (substantive) but not functioning in that role, while someone else acts in that role or performs that function temporarily. These practices can be seen from the details provided below in the accounts of his appointments in the Straits Settlements and F.M.S. civil service.

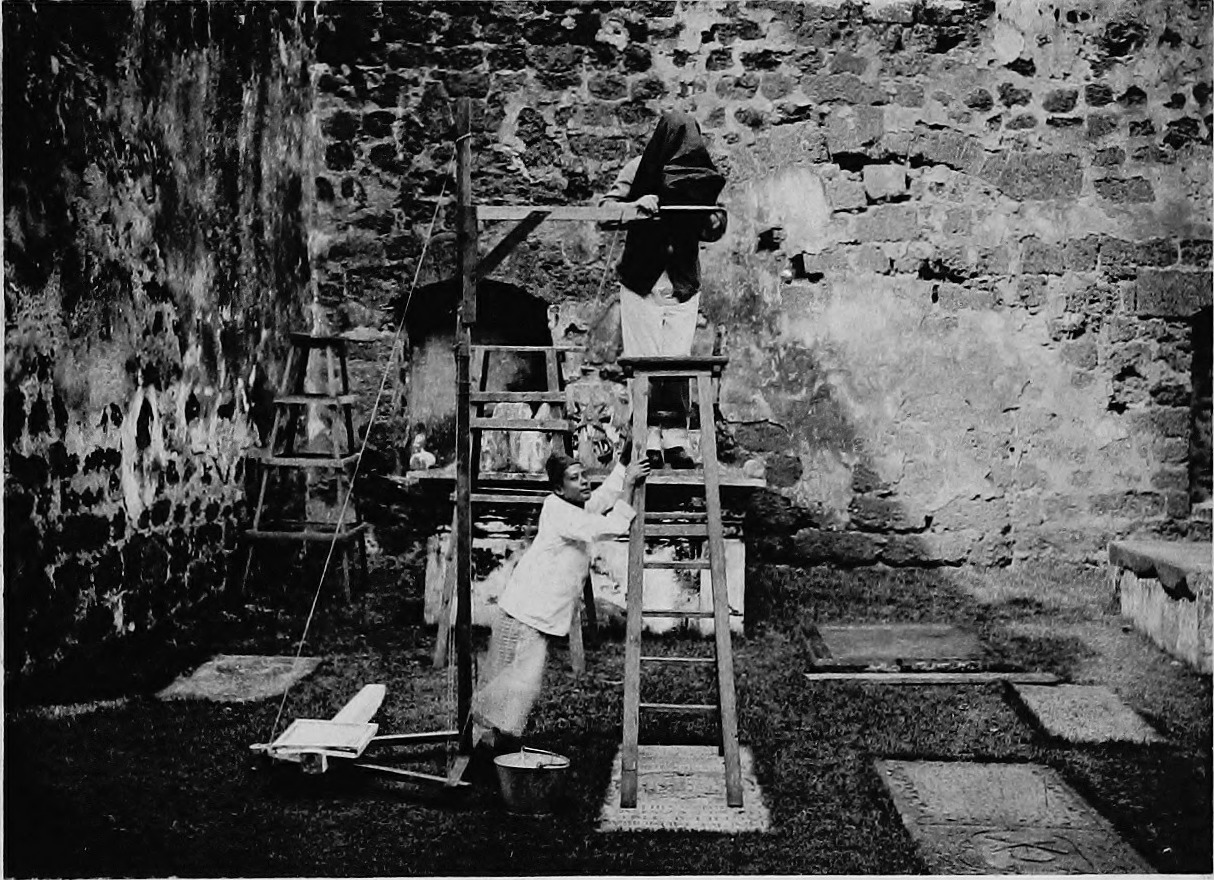
An illustration of the method used to photograph tombstones at the ruins of St. Paul's Church, Malacca for Bland's work Historical Tombstones of Malacca, 1905.

== The Colonial Civil Service Examinations ==
When Granville Leveson-Gower, 2nd Earl Granville was Secretary of State for the Colonies (9 December 1868 to 6 July 1870) competitive examinations were instituted for candidates between 20 and 23 years of age. Sir Frank Athelstane Swettenham was among the first Cadets to arrive at the Straits under this system which continued as it was until 1882. Swettenham's contemporaries, also arriving under this system included James Kortright Birch, Charles Walter Sneyd-Kynnersley, Arthur Philip Talbot, Henry Arthur O'Brien, Edward Charles Hepworth Hill, Frederick Gordon Penney, Edward Marsh Merewether, and Walter Egerton. Ernest Woodford Birch also came out at this time but was excused the Cadet Examinnations, having been previously employed at the Colonial Office for some time. John Wodehouse, 1st Earl of Kimberley served as Secretary of State for the Colonies twice, the first from 6 July 1870 to 17 February 1874 and then again 21 April 1880 to 16 December 1882. During the latter period open competition for entry to the service of the Straits Settlements, Hong Kong and Ceylon, was started. Those who were successful were allowed to choose among the available vacancies in these three places. They had to pass through the qualifying and then the advanced examination. It was under this system that Robert Norman Bland, William Evans, Reginald George Watson, Arthur Warren Swete O'Sullivan, James Oliver Anthonisz, George Thompson Hare, Edward Lewis Brockman, and John Robert Innes entered the service of the Straits Settlements' Colonial Administration.

Bland had prepared for his Eastern Cadetship Examination with the help of the Wren and Gurney College. He came out 2nd in the Examination. He was not alone. Making use of this same institution were Evans (3rd), Innes (2nd), Watson (2nd), Sullivan (4th) A. H. Capper (5th), and Francis Powell (1st)

== Cadetship ==
On 21 January 1883, the Messageries Maritimes steamer Iraouaddy [Irrawaddy], Captain Pasqualini, departed Marseilles with 23-year-old Robert Norman Bland and 22-year-old William Evans. They passed Naples, Port Said, Suez, Aden and Colombo, arriving at Singapore alongside the Borneo Company's wharf on the morning of 19 February 1883. They reported their arrival immediately upon landing. On 2 March 1883, vide the Government Gazette of even date, the Secretary of State appointed Bland and Evans to be Cadets in the Service of the Colony of the Straits Settlements. By that same Gazette, the Governor, at Singapore, appointed John Hope Callcott to be Superintendent of Works and Surveys, Singapore, and Acting Deputy Colonial Engineer and Surveyor-General, Penang, vice William Daniel Bayliss, retired; and Frederick Charles Sheppard to be Superintendent of Works and Surveys, Malacca, and Acting Superintendent of Works, Singapore, vice John Hope Callcott, promoted.

Bland began his internship as a Cadet attached to the Colonial Secretary's Office, learning the Chinese language.

The next year, on 11 June 1884, Cadet Bland passed his Final Examination in the Malay language. Under the same Government Gazette of 13 June that recorded this, the Secretary of State approved the appointments of Swettenham and John Pickersgill Rodger as Acting Residents of Perak and Selangor, respectively, and the Acting Governor made several appointments: Robert Douglas Hewett to be a Justice of the Peace for the Straits Settlements; Acting Inspector-General of Police Robert Walter Maxwell to Chairman of the Board of Licensing Justices, Singapore; Hancock Thomas Haughton to Member of the Board of Licensing Justices, Singapore, vice Richard Spear O'Connor; E. W. Birch to Magistrate for the Settlement of Singapore, Temporary Protector of Chinese and Registering Officer under the Contagious Diseases Ordinance of Singapore. The Acting Governor also granted, subject to the approval of the Secretary of State: Leave of absence with half salary for three and a half months from 1 June to Resident at Sungei Ujong William Francis Bourne Paul; Vacation leave for three months from 13 June after which leave of absence with half salary for 12 months to Acting Protector of Chinese Singapore Francis Powell; Vacation leave for two and a half months after which leave of absence for four and a half months at half salary to Senior Magistrate and Commissioner of the Court of Requests at Singapore R. S. O'Connor; and subject to the approval of Her Majesty's Government, the Governor recognised Senor Don Carlos de Garcimartin as Consul for Spain from 6 June.

On 13 March 1885, Bland received the temporary appointment as the Acting Governor Cecil Clementi Smith's Private Secretary.

It was reported that on 1 February 1886, at a meeting of the Committee at the Chamber of Commerce in Penang, Bland, together with H. R. Maynard and Koh Seang Tat were appointed to the General Committee of the Penang Chamber of Commerce. At that time the Committee was discussing the plans for the celebration of the coming Centenary of Penang, and related fund-raising activities. However, he was conspicuously absent in news reports of the actual event, towards the end of August that year. Bland was also listed as a member of the Local Committee in Penang of the Straits Settlements Commission at Singapore appointed by the Colonial Governments for the Colonial and Indian Exhibition of 1886, which opened in May that year.

== The Straits Settlements and F.M.S. Civil Service Appointments ==
By the time he retired, Bland had served the people of the different parts of the Straits Settlements, and the Federated Malay States in a wide variety of roles spanning the Executive, Legislative and Judicial branches of Government.

=== Local government and public administration ===
In 1888 Bland was appointed District Officer, Southern District (Nibong Tebal), Province Wellesley.

At the end of 1893 Bland, of the Land Office at Singapore, proceeded to Sungei Ujong to temporarily assume charge there, vice Walter Egerton who went to Singapore as First Magistrate, Cadet Elcum succeeding Bland at the Land Office. Bland arrived at Sungei Ujong, by train on 5 December 1893, met at the station by the Heads of Department there. On the 6th he visited all the Public Offices with Egerton, then took charge of the Residency.

He served as Officer in Charge, Negri Sembilan from January to April 1895.

Upon retirement of E. E. Isemonger and H. Trotter there was a reshuffle and Bland was appointed, in April 1897, Acting Senior District Officer for Province Wellesley.

In the first quarter of 1900 Inspector-General of Prisons for the Straits Settlements, Bland, was appointed Acting Resident Councillor of Malacca, with J. O. Anthonisz appointed Acting Inspector General of Prisons in addition to his existing duties. On 1 May 1900, Bland, who till then had taken his seat among the Officials of the Legislative Council as the Acting Colonial Treasurer, now took his seat as Acting Resident Councillor of Malacca.

In the first week of December 1901 Bland was nominated Municipal Commissioner for the town and fort of Malacca and appointed President of the Municipal Council vice Gilbert Amos Hall.

Returning from home leave in October 1906, Bland and his wife departed England and arrived in Singapore in November that year, proceeding to Penang which he arrived at on the 21st, to take up his appointment as Acting Resident Councillor there, vice J. K. BIrch, on three months vacation leave.

In May 1907 Acting Resident Councillor, Officer in Class I of the Straits Settlements Civil Service was appointed Resident Councillor of Penang in the same class. William Evans, whom Bland had arrived together with back in 1883, was similarly appointed Resident Councillor of Malacca.

=== Straits Settlements Legislative Council ===
Bland was a lawmaker serving on the parliament of the Straits Settlements at that time, its Legislative Council, which was made up of senior members of the Straits Settlements Administration, called The Officials, and members of the general public, called The Unofficials, both appointed by the Government. He served among The Officials from November 1899 until the time he retired in 1910.

Bland had served there as Acting Colonial Treasurer, Acting Resident Councillor of Malacca, Acting Resident Councillor of Penang, and Resident Councillor of Penang.

The last Legislative Council meeting that Bland attended was on 11 April 1910. Among the articles for discussion was the decision that had been made to reduce the Status of Malacca and its head official. Unofficial Member the Hon. T. S. Baker introduced a motion requesting Government to reconsider its decision, which was seconded by Tan Jiak Kim and all other Unofficials. The only support from the Official Members came from Bland. The motion lost with 7 votes for and 8 against.

=== The Malayan Courts ===
Apart from his appointment as Collector of Land Revenue at Sri Menanti in December 1886, Bland, at the same time, served Malacca as Magistrate. Martin Lister replaced Bland as Collector and Magistrate at the end of 1886.

From the Government Gazette of 27 May 1887 we learn that Cadet Bland passed the final examination in Law on 1 April. And from the Government Gazette of 13 May 1887, that he had been appointed Acting Second Magistrate at Penang, in addition to his existing duties as Acting Assistant Postmaster-General, the latter of which he was relieved of, upon Noel Trotter's return to Penang.

In 1889 the papers reported, "We are informed that a Marine Court of enquiry, consisting of Captain Bradbery, Harbour-Master, Mr. R. N. Bland, Acting Senior Magistrate, and Captain Menzel, will be held at the Police Court on Thursday next to enquire into the loss of the steamer Prye, at the entrance of Trang river, on the night of 8th ultimo."

Under Government Notification No. 210 of 9 April 1890, Bland was appointed to the Commission of the Peace for the Settlement of Singapore and reported in the Government Gazette of 29 August he was appointed a Magistrate for the Settlement of Singapore.

On 13 September 1890 Bland began serving as Acting Commissioner of the Court of Requests at Singapore vice Anthonisz, absent in Ceylon. However, serving in so many roles resulted in Bland postponing many cases a day. A backlog grew but was set right by middle of November 1890 on the return of Anthomisz.

In 1891 he was appointed to the Board of Visiting Justices, and by December that year was a Visiting Justice for the Singapore Prison.

A newspaper in May 1892 reported, "To-day, Mr. Kynnersley presided at the Third Court. Since the departure of Mr. Woodward, no official has been appointed to fill his place. The present arrangement is that Mr. Bland sits in the morning and Mr. Hare in the afternoon."

In early 1893 Bland was appointed a Visitor to the Lunatic Asylum under Indian Act 36 of 1858. In late April 1893 Collector of Land Revenue Bland was appointed Acting Sheriff of Singapore, vice Kyshe in addition to his existing duties. Sheriff Kyshe had been appointed to act as Registrar of the Supreme Court vice Thornton who departed for Europe on Holiday.

In mid-1896, T. H. Kershaw having accepted the position of Legal adviser to the Government of the Protected Malay States, Bland took over Kershaw's vacant position at the Official Assignee's Office, 2nd Assistant Colonial Secretary E. L. Brockman acting for Bland at the Land Office. A few months later, during the absence of Egerton, the duties of Registrar of Deeds at Singapore was added to this. At this time, his substantive position was that of Collector of Land Revenue at Singapore.

Towards the end of November 1896 Bland was appointed Acting Sheriff and Deputy Registrar at Singapore vice L. M. Woodward, appointed to act as Senior District Officer of Province Wellesley.

In May 1899 Bland was appointed to the Board of Licensing Justices.

=== Prisons ===
In February 1897 Bland was appointed Acting Inspector of Prisons for the Straits Settlements and Superintendent of Prisons at Singapore, Ralph Scott taking over his post as Collector of Land Revenue at Singapore. In November that year he was confirmed in those appointments but was to proceed to Province Wellesley where he was to act as Senior District Officer there.

On 15 April 1898 Bland advertised the availability of rattan work. Baskets, chairs, and various kinds of coir matting made at the Prison were, it was announced, available for sale at reasonable prices, as were a limited number of tennis nets. Limited orders of finer work from the Women's Prison, could be accepted.

In April 1900 he was transferred to Malacca to act as Resident Councillor there, duly reporting to Malacca upon his return from home leave at the end of October 1901.

In October 1903, Inspector of Prisons Bland was once more posted to Malacca as Resident Councillor.

=== Colonial Treasurer ===
On 1 November 1899 Bland was sworn in as Acting Colonial Treasurer and took his seat on the Legislative Council. His appointment was on top of his existing duties.

In June 1904 Inspector General of Prisons in Class II (a) Bland was promoted to the Office of the Treasurer of the Straits Settlements in Class I, vice F. G. Penney. However, Penney was to continue in the Office of Treasurer and Bland as Acting Resident Councillor at Malacca.

=== Land Office ===
Towards the end of May, 1886, Bland proceeded to "Qualla Pilah to take up the appointment of Collector of Land Revenue" at Sri Menanti, arriving there aboard the S.S. Pakan on 28 May.

While serving as Magistrate at Penang, in 1887, Bland was deputed, during the re-survey of Penang and Province Wellesley, to divide the areas of Province Wellesley to be surveyed, into Mukims. It was at this time that the term Mukim came into use in the Straits Settlements.

He was appointed Collector of Land Revenue at Penang in 1889. In January 1890 Collector of Land Revenue at Penang, Bland, was appointed Collector of Land Revenue at Singapore, William Evans, then 2nd Assistant Protector of Chinese at Penang being appointed to Bland's vacant position. At the same time Bland was also appointed Acting Registrar of Bills of Sale at Singapore.

1891 seemed, for Bland, to be taken up with the auctioning off of land including the former Hye San Kongsee's property (2,278 square feet) at Upper Cross Street on 15 January, and various other plots sold under Section 8 of Ordinance IV, 188 on 16 April, 17 September. Auctions were also held under his hand on 25 March 1892.

In October 1892, together with Tunku Mahmud bin Sultan Ali, Bland was appointed a Demarcation Officer for that part of Singapore to be demarcated: (a) Rochor Road; (b) Beach Road and Little Cross Street; (c) Jalan Sultan and Sultan Road; (d) Arab Street.

In December 1898 Bland was appointed Acting Collector of Land Revenue at Singapore in addition to his existing duties as Inspector of Prisons Straits Settlements and Superintendent of Prisons in Singapore.

=== Straits Settlements Postal Service ===
In April 1886, Dudley Francis Amelius Hervey, Resident Councillor of Malacca, left for Europe on home leave. This created the need to fill his seat on the Legislative Council among the Official Members and gave rise to a reshuffle in the S.S. Civil Service. Edwin Empson Isemonger, who sat on the Council as Acting Colonial Treasurer, moved to Malacca as Acting Resident Councillor; Richard Spear O'Connor, then Senior Magistrate, took Isemonger's place as Acting Colonial Treasurer; Henry Arthur O'Brien, Magistrate at Malacca and Acting British Resident at Sungei Ujong, to act as Senior Magistrate; Edward Marsh Merewether, Collector of Land Revenue and newly appointed Magistrate at Singapore, to act as Magistrate in Malacca; and Hancock Thomas Haughton, newly appointed Acting Superintendent of Police, Licensing Officer (Excise and Gunpowder Ordinances and Act), Deputy Registrar (Contagious Diseases Ordinance) and Coroner at Malacca, to act for Merewether.

A similar sort of shuffling had led to Bland's appointment as Acting Assistant Postmaster-General. The position of Assistant Postmaster-General had been held by Noel Trotter who was formerly Postmaster-General at Penang, a post that was subsequently downgraded to Assistant Postmaster-General, who also, at that time, having moved to Singapore for the purpose, was Acting Postmaster-General. Trotter had acted in that role several times in the past for Isemonger who also held the position of Postmaster-General. In July 1887, Hervey returned, Isemonger resumed his position of Postmaster-General and Trotter moved pack to Penang from Singapore, to once again continue as Assistant Postmaster-general there.

=== Vernacular Schools Commission ===
Together with Hill and Venerable Archdeacon Perham, Bland was appointed a Commissioner to enquire into the workings of the Vernacular Schools at Penang, under the Chair of the Resident Councillor at Penang, and left for there on 27 July 1893. By the middle of September the Commission were in Malacca enquiring and reporting on the workings of the Malay schools in that Settlement.

=== Royalist and patriot ===
Bland had established the League of the Empire, devoted to bringing all the units of Overseas Great Britain into touch, mainly by the observance of Empire day in schools, at Malacca. Upon its inauguration there a Chinese Malaccan Ong Kim Wee founded a fund to provide an annual prize on Empire Day, to be competed for by the English-speaking boys of Malacca. The $600 he gave to this, would produce about $40 a year to be used for the purchase of prizes that the elder boys could compete for. A newspaper reporting on that in September 19006, also noted that Bland, unlike the heads of government at the other two Settlements was not someone to be admired from a distance but had personal relationships with many of the local community who view him as their head.

In May 1907 Bland offered Penang Free School students a $25 prize for the best pupils passing the examination in the history of the British Empire.

As he had done in Malacca, Bland inaugurated public celebration of Empire Day at Penang. In 1907 the local populace were treated to a parade by the Cadet Corps of the Penang Free School at the Esplanade. In May 1908, two thousand students assembled at the Esplanade. The Penang Cadet Corps, and pupils of the Anglo-Chinese Free School and St. Xavier's School were reviewed at the Esplanade, densely thronged by interested members of the local community.

By August 1908 Bland was busy taking steps to organise a branch of the National Service League at Penang.

== Health, disease and quarantine ==
=== Rinderpest in Malacca ===
In 1900, as Acting Resident Counciilor of Malacca, Bland had ordered the slaughter of twenty-eight buffaloes and five cows in order to help check an outbreak of rinderpest that had occurred during the year. He had done this without carefully observing the law that provided for no slaughter unless first examined by a qualified veterinary surgeon and pronounced to be infected with rinderpest. In November that year, the Legislative Council, without any dissenting voices, voted $1,005 to compensate owners of the animals slaughtered by Bland.

=== Pulau Jerejak Quarantine Camp ===
On 5 January 1910 Bland, together with Colonial Engineer F. J. Pigott, Deputy Colonial Engineer C. G. May and Captain Stockley, accompanied Governor Sir John Anderson G.C.M.G. on an inspection of "Prai and the northern district of Province Wellesley, motoring up to Permatang and Bindabari, on the Kedah frontier, where the party crossed the Muda River to Kota, the principal township of Kuala Muda, in the district of Kedah." Having inspected the courthouse, general hospital and police station, they returned to Penang on 6 January, along the same route. On the 7th they proceeded to inspect the works at Pulau Jerejak.

In mid-May 1907 Bland accompanied Governor Sir John Anderson on an inspection of the site for a proposed F.M.S. Quarantine Camp at the northern end of Pulau Jerejak.

On 3 June, Bland was back at Pulau Jerejak, accompanied by Acting Deputy Colonial Engineer C. G. May, Colonial Surgeon Thomas Crichton Mugliston, and Superintendent of Works Norman Wilkinson (Wilkie) to inspect the site of the proposed quarantine camp for the Colony and the Federated Malay States, and a new temporary shed, after which they went over to the Leper Asylum to choose a site for a new leper ward.

In September 1907 there was an outbreak of cholera and smallpox aboard the British India steamer Teesta, bringing in 3,700 Indian Coolies bound for, among other situations, the many plantations on the Peninsula. About 2,500 of them were landed at Pulau Jerejak, the remaining 1,200 or so, meant for disembarkation at Port Swettenham were taken to St. John's Island. This new influx, bringing the total there to over 3,000 inmates, strained the resources of Pulau Jerejak to near breaking point. The Agricultural Coolies, imported by the Malay Peninsula Agricultural Society, housed in wooden sheds, fed and slept on wooden benches, a situation considered to give rise to the harbouring of germs and the spread of infection. Bland had had to draw 50 of George Town's Sikh Police to stand guard duty at Pulau Jerejak. By 17 September things had improved, a total of 900 under detention being released over the 16th and 17th, and it was being proposed to take in 500 passengers from the British India steamer Thongwa, the remainder of the Thongwa's 3,000 passengers to be sent to S. John's Island, Singapore.

In late February, after nineteen deaths had occurred during its voyage, the Blue Funnel steamer Idomeneus bringing 859 pilgrims from Jeddah, arrived at Penang. 24 pilgrims, including 7 with smallpox, were landed at Pulau Jerejak, the remaining pilgrims proceeding to quarantine at St. John's Island, Singapore. In late March 1908 the British India steamer Thongwa, from the Coromandel Coast was ordered to remain outside the Penang Harbour limits. Cholera had broken out and two had died during the voyage. The remaining 862 ordinary passengers and 744 immigrants were quarantined at Pulau Jerejak.

In May 1908 Superintendent of Immigrants, Lewis Hare Clayton, paid a report on Indian Immigration for 1907 before the Legislative Council. The figures argued for an increase in the capacity that could be managed at Pulau Jerejak. 60,547 immigrants had arrived in Penang from Southern India in 1907, the highest number ever recorded. Clayton's reported noted that the accommodation at Pulau Jerejak had been considerably extended in 1907 to handle up to 3,500 inmates, and that a new and improved quarantine camp, in course of construction on the western side of the island, was expected to be completed before the end of 1908.

Apparently this was insufficient.

On 24 June Bland called for tenders, to be received at the Resident Councillor's Office by noon 12 September 1908 for supply and erection of steelwork for thirty-two corrugated iron buildings at Pulau Jerejak. The work took much longer than first estimated. In the first week of January 1910, just a few months before he retired and left the Colony, Bland escorted Governor John Anderson on an inspection of the work in progress there.

On 24 August, Bland received a deputation from the Penang Chinese Chamber of Commerce, comprising Leong Lok Hing, J.P. (Chairman), Lim Hua Cheam, J.P. Lim Eu Toh, Goh Taik Chee, and Yeoh Guan Seok, who wished to address the Resident Councillor on the regulations for the quarantine of passengers. Also in attendance at that meeting were, Dr. Sidney Herbert Reginald Lucy, Acting Senior Medical Officer, Penang, Dr. George Williamson Park, Municipal Health Officer, and Mr. David Beatty, Acting Assistant Protector of Chinese, were in attendance. The Chamber desired the Government to allow any member from an imported port to land provided he produces a certificate of membership, with his photograph affixed; and that its members may be allowed to stand security for the daily appearance of any passenger before the Municipal Health Officer. In both cases, the member guaranteeing his own or any one else's appearance will pay a penalty of $100 in default. The deputation had been appointed to explain to the Resident Councillor the Chamber's request that its certificate of membership should be recognised as a sufficient guarantee to permit of the landing of a passenger from an infected port. Bland requested the deputation to supply further particulars concerning the constitution of the Chamber before giving his reply. They were not heard from again.

The work seemed to get bigger and bigger.

On 18 September 1908, the Colonial Secretary called for tenders for the erection of a reinforced concrete jetty for the new quarantine camp at Kampong Panchor, Pulau Jerejak.

In his 1910 Budget speech, on 1 October 1909, Governor Sir John Anderson noted that progress had been made with the new quarantine camp at Pulau Jerejak and that it was expected to be finished at the end of 1910.

It was not.

In April 1911, a year after Bland had left, the new quarantine camp at Pulau Jerejak was opened, quietly, without ceremony. It was finally completed at a cost of $500,000.

=== Surra in Penang ===
On 22 May 1907 Bland received a telegram from the Police at Balik Pulau reporting that Glanders had broken out there. Bland immediately sent Alfred Martin White, Government Veterinary Inspector, across the hills to investigate. White, whose diagnosis was later confirmed by a pathological examination by Government Veterinary Surgeon, William Henry MacArthur, who identified the bacteria as being the Trypanswomes.

On 3 June Bland visited Balik Pulau himself, together with MacArthur. He determined that stringent measures and every precaution must be taken to check the spread of the disease.

It was fortunate that the whole district of Balik Pulau, being isolated from George Town by the intervening hill ranges, was suitable for the purposes of quarantine.

A few days later Bland had issued an order prohibiting the export of equines, other than bona fide race-horses, from Penang, except under a certificate from the Government Veterinary Surgeon, McArthur.

== Moments in Malayan history ==
=== Penang fishermen's dispute ===
In March 1907 Acting Resident Councillor Bland visited the Siamese Western Malay States. Upon his return to Penang he proceeded immediately to Gertak Sanggul at the southern part of Penang Island to settle a dispute among the Chinese villagers there. Some fishermen had cut down several coconut trees on Crown Land leased to one Chinese there in order to clear more space for their nets. After receiving a warning from the relevant District Officer they made an appeal to Bland who determined that more space was needed and therefore allowed for the fishermen.

=== Penang's sampan-men dispute ===
In 1908, the sampan-men of Penang harbour went on strike. Looking in on the situation, Bland determined the need for a broader and deeper investigation into the complaints of the sampan-men, and the public who complained about their unusual charges. In December 1908, the Government acted on Bland's suggestion and a Committee comprising Judge L. E. P. Wolferstan (Chairman), Harbour Master Commander D. C. MacIntyre R.N.R., and Assistant Protector of Chinese David Beatty was appointed to enquire into the complaints of the sampan men of Penang.

The cause of the strike was, according to the complainants, due to the prohibition of careening and repairing on Weld Quay, and inadequate fares. Launches from the Government Wharves, the Prye Dock and elsewhere, carried on passenger traffic and assisted in loading and discharging cargo.

This strike was carried on by sampan-men of all ethnicities. The sampan-men had earlier on been fined heavily for insisting that passengers pay more than the two cents per passenger each way to and from steamers within the inner harbour and four cents to vessels in the outer harbour set down in the Harbour Rules for Sampans. While some viewed this as extortion there were cases mentioned where passengers gave more than the rules called for, of their own accord. The case where a passenger gave 30 cents and the sampan-man was fined $20 is said to have led to the leaders of the sampan-men initiating the strike. The sampan-men found the prohibition on repairing their boats along Weld Quay a hardship and the fares dictated by the Harbour Rules inadequate. The prohibition, apparently came about because of complaints from tongkang-men who were unable to get near to Weld Quay, being obstructed by sampans laid up for repair. The strike was said to have involved 150 sampans.

According to reports, on 2 November from thirty to forty sampan-men entered the house of the contractor who supplies the Harbour Department with fuel for launches, and threatened to maim him if he refused to join their cause by stopping supplies. The contractor told them he would not have anything to do with them, and, fearing an attack, collected in all of his coolies, although the sampan-men did not reappear. On 13 November Lim Eow Thong and Goh Taik Chee introduced a deputation of sampan-men to Assistant Protector of Chinese Beatty, whereupon the sampan-men related the hardship brought about by the prohibition on repairs along Weld Quay, and of the inadequacy of the present fare structure. Beaty said he would lay these complaints before Bland. Following that a meeting took place at Bland's office. In addition to the Chinese sampan-men who talked to Beatty, leaders of the Malay and Indian sampan-men approached Major H. Barry de Hamel, the Chief Police Officer, and L. H. Clayton, the Superintendent of Indian Immigration. The Government refused to do anything unless the sampan-men called off their strike.

The strike ended and the men went back to work on the 14th.

Towards the end of March 1909 an elaborate table of fares for use in Penang Harbour was published in the Government Gazette.

=== Penang Chong Hwa Confucian School opening ===
On 8 February 1909 at 12 noon, Penang's Resident Councillor, Bland, officiated at the opening ceremony of the Chung Hwa Confucian High School. Assembled there at the opening of the new $80,000 Mandarin-medium school were the principal members of the ethnic-Chinese community of Penang.

Beginning his address, Bland said, "Mr. Thio Tiau Siat was responsible for the building of the new school, at a cost of about $65,000. The site cost $15,000, exclusive of the portion given by the Hok Tek Cheng Sin Kongsi, and the building just opened cost $50,000."

Thio Tiau Siat, or Cheong Fatt Tze as he is known by some today, was a Guandong-born Hakka, a Sumatran planter and businessman, Commissioner of Railways for Swatow and Director of the Canton-Hankow Railway, Sole-Proprietor of the Ban Joo Hin line of steamships at Penang, and Chinese Consul-General for Singapore and Vice-Consul for Penang.

In 1905, Thio, together with Foo Choo Choon and three others, each subscribed $5,000 towards the inauguration of a Mandarin-medium school in Penang, the classes at that time being conducted at a room inside the Penang Chinese Town Hall, the cost of classes at $500 a month being defrayed by Thio. Eventually, a suitable site was identified and secured and a building erected. The new school, situated at Maxwell Road next to the Anglo-Chinese School there, by that time already had a population of 100 pupils and 4 teachers.

Bland noted that it was fitting to have a Mandarin-medium school given that three-fourths of the population of China spoke Mandarin, three-fourths of the population of the Straits Settlements were ethnically Chinese, and that whether Straits-born or China-born, all of them should have the opportunity of learning Mandarin. He commended a knowledge of Chinese Classics to those students in the Colony and trusted that, should they return to China, they would take with them the idea of freedom as imparted to them in that British Colony of the Straits Settlements.

Yeoh Guan Seok, on behalf of the principal ethnic-Chinese members present, thanked Resident Councillor Bland and took the opportunity to dispel a misleading rumour. The establishment of the new institution, he said, had no political intent. There were many ethnic-Chinese in Penang who were naturally interested in the place of their ancestral origins, including its politics, but enjoyed the peace and prosperity they experienced under British governance, also taking a keen interest in the activities and achievements of the British government, so ably represented by Bland. The objects of the new school, Yeoh said, were simply to provide pupils a knowledge of Chinese literature and people, with a view to intellectual development and to help prepare them for careers in business.

=== Malacca's Victoria Memorial Fountain ===
On 24 May 1905, Acting Resident Councillor Bland officiated at the unveiling of Malacca's Victoria Memorial Fountain. In his address to the assembled, Bland noted that Malacca owed their memorial largely to the action and efforts of the late Lee Keng Liat and other Chinese gentlemen associated with him. "In 1902 the Committee of the Memorial Fund Singapore had invited Malacca to join them in the erection of a Town Hall in Singapore. A meeting was held in Malacca to discuss this, and on behalf of the Chinese Lee Keng Liat expressed a desire to erect instead some local memorial, and stated that some $1,500 had already been subscribed for that purpose. The meeting upon this decided that a fountain should be erected in front of the Stadt House and designs were called for. The designs submitted locally were not generally approved, and subsequently, Messrs Doulton of London were asked to submit one. They did so and their design with some few alterations was accepted, and had resulted in this graceful memorial, which had been erected at a cost of about $5,000.." Bland said that thanks were due to the late Lee Keng Liat and also to C. Garrard (Secretary of the Committee), Doulton of London, and Superintendent of Works Lupton who had supervised the project.

=== Malacca's Jubilee Tablet ===
Acting Resident Councillor Bland officiated at the unveiling of a tablet commemorating the Diamond Jubilee of Queen Victoria at Malacca on 2 July 1900. $2,000 had been contributed by the local population to which Government had added $1,500 making a total of $3,000. From its proceeds a scholarship had been established to be won by the best boy in the seventh standard, which was won in its first year by Sit Peng Lock who held it for a year and was at this date pursuing this studies at the Madras Medical College, and in the second year by A. J. Minjoot who was, at that time, doing well in his studies at Malacca.

=== Malacca Railway ===
On 1 December 1905, signalled by the arrival whistle of a locomotive's engine, the Malacca branch of the F.M.S. Railway was declared open, Acting Resident Councillor Bland having arrived at 6.30 a.m. at Kubu Station where he met R. C. Fryer, Firmstone, Lupton and Darbishire (the constructing engineer), after which they proceeded to Tampin, arriving there at 7.40. With the extension of rail services to Malacca, it was now possible to leave there at 1 p.m. and arrive at Penang at 6.21 a.m. the following day, instead of taking two or three days by steamer. The project had pushed ahead with speed. The first sod was cut on 9 June 1901 and plate laying commenced October 1904. Malacca's first engine was put together at the Malacca Yard, and steam was got up on 9 November 1904. The rails were joined to the trunk line on 15 May and the laying of 2.5 miles of railway track completed by 1 December.
