= Federated Malay States =

British Malaya protected state

Coordinates: 3.1597°N 101.7000°E

Federated Malay States Negeri-Negeri Melayu Bersekutu (Malay)
- 1895–1942; 1942–1945 (Japanese occupation); 1945–1946
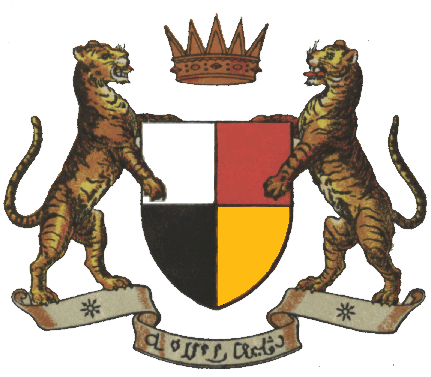
- Flag Coat of arms
- Motto: Dipelihara Allah دڤليهارا الله (English: "Under God's Protection")
- British Malaya in 1922: Unfederated Malay States Federated Malay States Straits Settlements
- Status: Federal protected state of the British Empire
- Capital: Kuala Lumpur^{1}
- Common languages: English; Malay²; Chinese; Tamil
- Religion: Sunni Islam; Christianity; Buddhism; Taoism (including Chinese folk religion); Hinduism
- Government: Constitutional monarchy
- Monarch
  - 1895–1901 (first): Victoria
  - 1936–1942; 1945–1946 (last): George VI
- Resident General
  - 1896–1901 (first): Sir Frank Swettenham
  - 1939–1942 (last): Hugh Fraser
- Legislature: Federal Council
- Historical era: British Empire
  - Federated: 1895
  - Treaty of Federation: 1 July 1896
  - Japanese occupation: 15 February 1942 – 2 September 1945
  - Japanese surrender: 2 September 1945
  - Malayan Union: 1 April 1946

Population
  - 1933: 1,597,700
- Currency: Straits dollar (1898–1939); Malayan dollar (1939–1942; 1945–1946)
Preceded by
Selangor
Perak
Negeri Sembilan
Pahang
Succeeded by
1942: Japanese occupation of Malaya
1945: British Military Administration (Malaya)
1946: Malayan Union
- Today part of: Malaysia
- ^{1} Also the state capital of Selangor ² Malay using Jawi script, although Rumi script is commonly used as well. ³ Later Chief Secretaries to the Government and Federal Secretaries

The Federated Malay States (FMS, Malay: Negeri-Negeri Melayu Bersekutu, Jawi: نݢري٢ ملايو برسکوتو) was a federation of four integrated protectorates in the Malay Peninsula comprising Selangor, Perak, Negeri Sembilan and Pahang. It was established in 1895 by the British government and lasted until 1946. In that year, these states joined with two of the former Straits Settlements (Malacca and Penang, excluding Singapore) and the Unfederated Malay States to form the Malayan Union. The union was short-lived and in 1948 was replaced by the Federation of Malaya, which gained independence in 1957. This federation later became Malaysia in 1963 following the inclusion of North Borneo (now Sabah), Sarawak and Singapore. Singapore was eventually separated from Malaysia and became a sovereign state on 9 August 1965.

Unlike the Unfederated Malay States, which retained greater internal autonomy, the real authority in the FMS resided with the four British Residents and the Resident-General. The powers of the local rulers were significantly restricted and were largely confined to matters "touching Malay religion and customs". The administration of the FMS represented a more centralised and interventionist colonial governance model in contrast to the comparatively decentralised arrangements in the Unfederated States. Nevertheless, the FMS remained nominally more autonomous than the Straits Settlements, which were directly governed by Britain through its Governor.

During World War II, the federation, along with the Unfederated Malay States and the Straits Settlements, was invaded and occupied by Japanese forces which culminated in the Fall of Singapore. After the Japanese surrender and the liberation of Malaya, the original federation was not reinstated and was replaced by the short-lived Malayan Union. Nevertheless, the federal model it had introduced remained influential and provided the administrative framework for the Federation of Malaya formed in 1948 and for the eventual creation of Malaysia in 1963.

== Formation and power structure ==
On 20 January 1874, Sir Andrew Clarke, governor of the Straits Settlements, concluded with the Sultan of Perak the treaty of Pangkor whereby the Sultan agreed to "receive and provide a suitable residence for a British Officer to be called Resident, who shall be accredited to his court, and whose advice must be asked and acted upon on all questions other than those touching Malay Religion and Customs". The residency system was extended the same year to Selangor and Negeri Sembilan, and in 1888 to Pahang.

To promote greater administrative efficiency, these four states were brought together under the Treaty of Federation 1895 to form the Federated Malay States (initially named Protected Malay States). (Note: Although the federation was de jure named as "Protected Malay States" in the 1895 Treaty, the name "Federated Malay States" has been de facto in use since then, and eventually make into the text of the 1909 Agreement that established the Federal Council. The reason for the change in name is unclear.) The treaty formally went into effect on 1 July 1896. This new federation's structure was highly centralized, with real power resting in the hands of the agents of the British Government, at first called the resident-general, and later the chief secretary. Under the treaty, the four states were required to assist each other in terms of manpower and money, essentially lumping their revenue system together. In case of war, the states were also obligated to supply Indian troops to assist the British.

In 1909, a further agreement between the British and Malay rulers was signed to establish the Federal Council, which would act as the federal legislative body. Modelled after the Legislative Council of the Straits Settlements, it was headed by the high commissioner (the Governor of the Straits Settlement), assisted by the resident-general, the four rulers, the four state residents and four nominated unofficial members. The heads of the various public departments could also be nominated to council by the High Commissioner. Additionally, the legal advisor of the government could attend the council's proceedings and advise on legal matters, but was not entitled to vote.

The Federal Council was responsible to pass law that apply to multiple states or the whole federation, and to consider the budgets and finances of each state and the federation. Laws passed by the State Councils may not be in conflict with federal law, except in matters of Islamic religion, political pensions, royal prerogatives, native chiefs and penghulus, where the State Councils retained exclusive jurisdiction over them.

This structure remained until the Japanese invaded Malaya on 8 December 1941.

== The sultans and first durbar ==
Although the Resident-General was the real administrator of the federation, each of the four constituent states of the federation retained their respective hereditary rulers. At the formation of the Federated Malay States, the reigning rulers were:

1. Sultan Alaiddin Sulaiman Shah of Selangor
2. Sultan Idris Murshidul ‘Adzam Shah I of Perak
3. Yamtuan Tuanku Muhammad Shah of Negeri Sembilan
4. Sultan Ahmad Mu’adzam Shah of Pahang

In 1897 the first durbar was convened in the royal town of Kuala Kangsar, Perak as the platform for discussions for the four rulers. This formed the basis for the Conference of Rulers that was created later on under Article 38 of the Malaysian Constitution on 27 August 1957.

== Flag and emblem of the Federation ==
=== Flag ===
1:2. Flag of the Federated Malay States (1895–1946)

The flag of the Federated Malay States consisted of four different-coloured stripes, from top to bottom: white, red, yellow and black. Different combinations of these colours represent the four states that formed the FMS — red, black and yellow are for Negeri Sembilan; black and white for Pahang; black, white and yellow for Perak; and red and yellow for Selangor. The same design concept is used in Malaysia's national emblem. In the middle is an oblong circle with a Malayan tiger in it.

The National History Museum located near the Dataran Merdeka in Kuala Lumpur, Malaysia has a replica of the federation's flag.

=== Coat of arms ===
The coat of arms of the Federated Malay States featured a shield guarded by two tigers. On the top of the shield is the crown (known as Eastern Crown in English heraldry), symbolising the federation of monarchies under the protection of the United Kingdom. A banner with the phrase "Dipelihara Allah" (Under God's Protection) written in Jawi is located underneath the shield.

The combinations of the four colours of the shield represents the colours of the flags of the states of the FMS in the same way the stripes of the FMS flag do.

- Red and yellow for Selangor
- Black, white and yellow for Perak
- Red, black and yellow for Negeri Sembilan
- Black and white for Pahang

This design forms the basis of the Federation of Malaya's national coat of arms along with the guardian tigers and a quartered shield of the same, symbolic four colours mentioned above.

The phrase "Dipelihara Allah" was also adopted as the current state motto for Selangor.

=== Naval Ensign ===
Naval ensign of the Federated Malay States (1895–1946)

In addition to a state flag, the Federated Malay States also had a naval jack or ensign for use on government ships. The ensign, with the four colours of the FMS, was flown by HMS Malaya, commanded by Captain Boyle under the 5th Battle Squadron of the British Grand Fleet) during the Battle of Jutland in the North Sea. This was the only full-scale clash of battleships during World War I.

== Government ==
=== Resident-General ===
From 1896 to 1936, real power lay in the hands of the Resident-General, later known as Chief Secretary of the Federation.

Residents-General of the FMS (1896–1911)
Order	Residents-Generals	From	Until	Notes
1	Frank Athelstane Swettenham	1 January 1896	12 December 1901	
	William Hood Treacher	5 October 1897	16 April 1898	Acting
	William Hood Treacher	29 April 1900	12 December 1901	Acting
2	William Hood Treacher	13 December 1901	31 December 1904	
	William Thomas Taylor	13 September 1904	31 December 1904	Acting
3	William Thomas Taylor	1 January 1905	30 September 1910	
	Edward Lewis Brockman	11 May 1907	13 February 1908	Acting
	Henry Conway Belfield	4 May 1908	27 July 1908	Acting
	Reginald George Watson	26 February 1910	29 September 1910	Acting
4	Reginald George Watson	30 September 1910	31 January 1911	

=== Chief Secretary to the Government ===
Flag of the Chief Secretary of the Federated Malay States

Chief Secretaries to the Government of the FMS (1911–1936)
Order	Chief Secretaries	From	Until	Notes
1	Arthur Young	1 February 1911	1 September 1911	
2	Edward Lewis Brockman	2 September 1911	12 September 1920	
	Reginald George Watson	3 April 1914	8 February 1915	Acting
	Edward George Broadrick	21 January 1918	5 February 1918	Acting
	Reginald George Watson	7 April 1918	25 August 1918	Acting
	Frederick Seton James	13 June 1920	3 October 1920	Acting
3	George Maxwell	13 September 1920	6 May 1926	
	Arthur Blennerhassett Voules	14 October 1920	4 March 1921	Acting
	Oswald Francis Gerard Stonor	21 December 1921	9 January 1922	Acting
	Edward Shaw Hose	11 May 1923	24 October 1923	Acting
4	William Peel	9 May 1926	9 April 1930	
	Henry Wagstaffe Thomson	6 May 1927	5 June 1927	Acting
	Henry Wagstaffe Thomson	10 September 1927	31 March 1928	Acting
	Charles Walter Hamilton Cochrane	30 November 1929	8 April 1930	Acting
5	Charles Walter Hamilton Cochrane	9 April 1930	24 March 1932	
	Andrew Caldecott	25 July 1931	23 March 1932	Acting
6	Andrew Caldecott	24 March 1932	3 February 1933	
7	Malcolm Bond Shelley	4 February 1933	4 April 1935	
8	Marcus Rex	4 April 1935	24 February 1936	

=== Federal Secretaries ===
After 1936 the Federal Secretaries were no more than co-ordinating officers, under the authority of the High Commissioners, which are always the Governors of the Straits Settlements

Federal Secretaries of the FMS (1936–1942)
Order	Federal Secretaries	From	Until
1	Christopher Dominic Ahearne	24 February 1936	6 May 1939
2	Hugh Fraser	6 May 1939	15 February 1942

=== State Council ===
In the Federated Malay States, the individual state were still ruled by rulers (a yamtuan in Negeri Sembilan and sultans elsewhere) but was now advised by the State Council for the purpose of administrating the state. The State Council was made up of the Resident (or in certain cases by the Secretary to the Resident), native chiefs, and representative(s) of the Chinese community nominated by the Sultan. The council discussed matters of interest for each respective state such as legislative and administrative issues as well as revision of all sentence of capital punishment. The Resident and his staff (mostly consist of European and Malay) carried on with the administrative work.

==== Residents ====
===== Selangor =====
- 1875–1876 James Guthrie Davidson (1837–1891)
- 1876–1882 William Bloomfield Douglas (1822–1906)
- 1882–1884 Frank Athelstane Swettenham (1850–1946)
- 1884–1888 John Pickersgill Rodger (1st time, acting, 1851–1910)
- 1889–1892 William Edward Maxwell (1846–1897)
- 1892–1896 William Hood Treacher (1849–1919)
- 1896–1902 John Pickersgill Rodger (2nd time, 1851–1910)
- 1902–1910 Henry Conway Belfield (1855–1923)
- 1910–1913 Reginald George Watson (1862–1926)
- 1913–1919 Edward George Broadrick (1864–1929)
- 1919–1921 Arthur Henry Lemon (1864–1933)
- 1921–1926 Oswald Francis Gerard Stonor (1872–1940)
- 1926–1927 Henry Wagstaffe Thomson (1874–1941)
- 1927–1930 James Lornie (1876–1959)
- 1930–1933 G. E. Cater (1884–1973)
- 1933–1935 George Ernest London (1889– 1957)
- 1935–1937 Theodore Samuel Adams (1885–1961)
- 1937–1939 Stanley Wilson Jones (1888–1962)
- 1939–1941 George Montgomery Kidd
- 1941 Norman Rowlstone Jarrett (acting, 1889–1982)

===== Perak =====
- 1874–1875 James Wheeler Woodford Birch (1826–1875)
- 1876–1877 James Guthrie Davidson
- 1877–1889 Hugh Low (Sir Hugh Low from 1883, 1824–1905)
- 1889–1896 Frank Athelstane Swettenham (1850–1946)
- 1896–1902 William Hood Treacher (1849–1919)
- 1902–1903 John Pickersgill Rodger (1851–1910)
- 1905–1910 Ernest Woodford Birch (1857–1929)
- 1910–1912 Henry Conway Belfield (1855–1923)
- 1912–1913 William James Parke Hume (1st time, acting, 1866–1952)
- 1913–1919 Reginald George Watson (1862–1926)
- 1919–1920 George Maxwell (1871–1959)
- 1920–1921 William James Parke Hume (2nd time, 1866–1952)
- 1921–1926 Cecil William Chase Parr (1871–1943)
- 1926–1927 Oswald Francis Gerard Stonor (1872–1940)
- 1927–1929 Henry Wagstaffe Thomson (1874–1941)
- 1929–1930 Charles Walter Hamilton Cochrane (1876–1932)
- 1931–1932 Bertram Walter Elles (1877–1963)
- 1932–1939 G. E. Cater (1884–1973)
- 1939–1941 Marcus Rex (1886–1971)

===== Negeri Sembilan =====
- 1888–1891 Martin Lister (1st time, 1857–1897)
- 1891–1894 William Francis Bourne Paul (1844–1930)
- 1894–1895 Robert Norman Bland (1859–1948)
- 1895–1897 Martin Lister (2nd time, 1857–1897)
- 1898–1901 Ernest Woodford Birch (1857–1929)
- 1901–1902 Henry Conway Belfield (1855–1923)
- 1902–1903 Walter Egerton (1858–1947)
- 1904–1910 Douglas Graham Campbell (1867–1918)
- 1910–1911 Richard James Wilkinson (1867–1941)
- 1912–1919 Arthur Henry Lemon (1864–1933)
- 1919–1921 John Richard Oliver Aldworth (acting) (1868–1948)
- 1921–1925 Edward Shaw Hose (1871–1946)
- 1925–1928 Ernest Charteris Holford Wolff (1875–1946)
- 1928–1932 James William Simmons (1877–19XX)
- 1932–1937 John Whitehouse Ward Hughes (1883–1946)
- 1937–1939 Gordon Lupton Ham (1885–1965)
- 1939–1941 John Vincent Cowgill (1888–1959)

===== Pahang =====
- 1888–1896 John Pickersgill Rodger (1851–1910)
- 1896–1900 Hugh Clifford (1st time, 1866–1941)
- 1900–1901 Arthur Butler (18XX–1901)
- 1901–D. H. Wise (acting)
- 1901–1903 Hugh Clifford (2nd time, 1866–1941)
- 1905–1908 Cecil Wray
- 1908–1909 Harvey Chevallier (acting)
- 1909–1910 Edward Lewis Brockman (1865–1943)
- 1910–1911 Warren Delabere Barnes (1865–1911)
- 1911–1917 Edward John Brewster (1861–1931)
- 1917–1921 Cecil William Chase Parr (1871–1943)
- 1921–1923 F. A. S. McClelland (acting) (1873–1947)
- 1923–1925 Henry Wagstaffe Thomson (1874–1941)
- 1926–1928 Arthur Furley Worthington (1874–1964)
- 1928–1930 C. F. J. Green
- 1930–1935 Hugh Goodwin Russell Leonard (1880–19XX)
- 1935–1941 C. C. Brown

=== Administrative subdivisions ===
Administrative divisions of the Federated Malay States in 1939

For the purpose of efficient administration, all the states of the federation were further divided into districts (Malay: Daerah). Each district was administered by a District Office (Malay: Pejabat Daerah) headed by a District Officer (Malay: Pegawai Daerah).

==== Perak ====
State capital: Ipoh, Perak

Districts:

- Hulu Perak (Upper Perak)
- Selama
- Larut
- Kerian
- Matang
- Kuala Kangsar
- Kinta
- Hilir Perak (Lower Perak)
- Batang Padang

Notes:
- Dinding and Pangkor Island were ceded to the British, administered as part of the Straits Settlements and were returned to the government of Perak in February 1935.
- The capital of Perak was moved to Ipoh in 1935.

==== Selangor ====
State capital: Kuala Lumpur (also served as the federal capital cum administrative centre)

Districts:

- Hulu Selangor
- Kuala Selangor
- Kuala Lumpur
- Klang
- Hulu Langat
- Kuala Langat

==== Negeri Sembilan ====
State capital: Seremban

Districts:

- Seremban
- Port Dickson (coastal district)
- Jelebu
- Kuala Pilah
- Rembau-Tampin

==== Pahang ====
State capital: Kuala Lipis

Districts:

- Lipis
- Raub
- Bentong
- Temerloh
- Kuantan
- Pekan

== The Federated Malay States as a forerunner to Malaysia ==
Evolution of Malaysia

== Law ==
The first Supreme Court was established in 1906 and headed by the Judicial Commissioner, in whom supreme judicial authority was vested. The title of Judicial Commissioner was changed to Chief Judge in 1925.

=== Judicial Commissioners ===
- 1896–1905 Lawrence Colvile Jackson
- 1906– Sir William Henry Hyndman Jones
- 1913–1917 Sir Thomas de Multon Lee Braddell
- 1917–1919 John Robert Innes (acting)
- 1919–1920 Sir G. Aubrey Goodman
- 1920 Percy Alan Farrer Manby (acting)
- 1921–1925 Sir Lionel Mabbot Woodward

=== Chief Judges ===
- 1925–1929 Sir Henry Hessey Johnston Gompertz
- 1929–1932 Sir Lancelot Henry Elphinstone
- 1933–1937 Sir Samuel Joyce Thomas
- 1937–1939 Sir Roger Evans Hall
- 1939–1941 Sir Kenneth Elliston Poyser
- 1941–c.1945 Sir Harry Herbert Trusted

== Economy ==
The Federated Malay States initially used the Straits dollar issued by the Board of Commissioners of Currency for the Straits Settlements. As the currency depreciated over time, it was pegged at two shillings four sterling pence in 1906. In 1939, the British government introduced a new currency, the Malayan dollar (ringgit in Malay) for used in Malaya and Brunei replacing the Straits dollar at par value. It had denominations ranging from 1 cent to 1,000 Malayan dollars.

The Federated Malay States main economic activities were agriculture and mining with emphasis on rubber and tin. The FMS and Malaya as a whole was the main supplier of these two commodities for British industrial needs. Rubber plantations were established in all four states and tin was mined primarily in the Klang valley in Selangor and the Kinta Valley in Perak. This labour-intensive economic activities prompted the British to bring in immigrant workers from southern India to work at the plantations and workers from southern China to mine the tin.

The economic condition in the period can be viewed as self-sustainable, as the income of the federation was more than what was expended in terms of maintaining the administration and economic activities. In the later period, many resources were put into the development of Kuala Lumpur, as the capital of the federation. This period also saw rapid growth in terms of communications infrastructure such as interstate roads, the expansion of the Federated Malay States Railways' narrow-gauge railway line between the Padang Besar and Singapore, and Port Swettenham (present-day Port Klang). Public schools and academic institutions were also opened along with an improvement in public health. An area in the city was also gazetted as a settlement for the Malay called Kampung Baru. Public buildings were also constructed such as the Kuala Lumpur railway station, the Government Offices of the FMS and Masjid Jamek.

The table and section below illustrated the economic growth of the federation and its member states.

Growth of trade and government revenue and expenditure (1875–1922)
Year	Revenue	Expenditure	Import	Export
1875	$409,394	$436,872	$831,375	$739,972
1880	$881,910	$794,944	$2,231,048	$1,906,952
1885	$2,208,709	$2,261,954	$8,667,425	$9,961,786
1890	$4,840,065	$5,237,275	$15,443,809	$17,602,093
1895	$8,481,007	$7,582,553	$22,653,271	$31,622,805
1900	$15,609,807	$12,728,930	$38,402,581	$60,361,045
1905	$23,964,593	$20,750,395	$50,575,455	$80,057,654
1910	$26,553,018	$23,598,610	$53,255,151	$102,851,990
1915	$40,774,984	$42,838,631	$61,343,935	$162,429,254
1920	$72,277,146	$100,433,471	$175,916,712	$289,112,016
1921	$54,449,568	$114,386,546	$102,914,877	$134,955,549
1922	$52,494,110	$49,811,007	$78,822,349	$140,429,775

^{Note: All values are in Straits dollars (One dollar fixed at two shillings and four pence sterling). Data for Pahang included only from 1890 onwards.}

^{Ref: Harrison, Cuthbert Woodville. An Illustrated Guide to the Federated Malay States. 1923.}

=== Selangor ===
The revenue of Selangor in 1875 amounted to $115,656; in 1905 it had increased to $8,857,793. Of this latter sum $3,195,318 was derived from duty on exported tin, $1,972,628 from finance, federal receipts, and $340,360 from land revenue. The trade balance was chiefly derived from the revenue farms, which included the right to collect import duty on opium and spirits. The expenditure for 1905 amounted to $7,186,146, of which sum $3,717,238 was on account of federal charges and $1,850,711 for public works. The value of the imports in 1905 was $24,643,619 and that of the exports was $26,683,316, making a total of $51,326,935 equivalent to £5,988,000. Tin was the principal export. The amount exported in 1905 was 17,254 tons. The total area of alienated mining land at the end of 1905 amounted to 65,573 acres (265 km^{2}).

=== Perak ===
The revenue of Perak in 1874 amounted to $226,333. That for 1905 amounted to $12,242,897. Of this latter sum $4,876,400 was derived from duty on exported tin, $2,489,300 from railway receipts, $505,300 from land revenue and $142,800 from postal and telegraphic revenue. The remainder is mainly derived from the revenue farms, which are leased for a short term of years, conveying to the lessee the right to collect import duties upon opium, wine and spirits, to keep pawnbroking shops, and to keep public licensed gambling-houses for the use of non-Malay only. The expenditure for 1905 amounted to $10,141,980. Of this sum $4,236,000 was spent on railway upkeep and construction and $2,176,100 on public works. The value of the imports into Perak during 1905 was over $20,000,000, and that of the exports exceeded $40,000,000, making a total of over $60,000,000, equivalent to about seven million sterling. The output of tin from Perak ranged between 18,960 tons, valued at $23,099,506 in 1899, and 26,600 tons, valued at $35,500,000, in 1905. The fluctuating output figure was due to the uncertainty of the labour supply. The mining population was recruited exclusively from the districts of southern China, and during certain years an increased demand for labourers in China itself, in French Indo-China, in the Dutch colonies, and in South Africa temporarily and adversely affected immigration to the Straits of Malacca. The output had, moreover, been affected from time to time by the price of tin, which was $32.20 per pikul in 1896, rose to $42.96 in 1898, to $74.15 in 1900, and averaged $80.60 in 1905. Excluding tin, the principal exports were $108,000 worth of Para rubber, $181,000 of copra, $54,000 of hides, $48,000 of patchouli, and considerable quantities of timber, rattans and other jungle produce.

=== Negeri Sembilan ===
The revenue of the Negri Sembilan amounted to $223,435 in 1888. In 1898 it had increased to $701,334, in 1900 to $1,251,366, and in 1905 to $2,335,534. The revenue for 1905 was derived mainly as follows: customs $1,268,602, land revenue $145,475, land sales $21,407, while the revenue farms contributed $584,459. The expenditure in 1905 amounted to $2,214,093, of which $1,125,355 was spent on public works. The trade returns for 1905, which are not, however, complete, showed an aggregate value of about $13,000,000. The value of the tin exported during 1905 exceeded $6,900,000, and the value of the agricultural produce, of which gambier represented $211,000 and damar $80,000, amounted to $407,990.

=== Pahang ===
The revenue of Pahang in 1899 amounted to $62,077; in 1900 to $419,150. In 1905 it was $528,368. The expenditure in 1905 amounted to $1,208,176. Of this sum $736,886 was spent on public works. Pahang is still a source of expense to the federation, its progress having been slowed by the disturbances which lasted from December 1891 until 1895, with short intervals of peace, but the revenue was steadily increasing, and the ultimate financial success of the state is considered to be secure. Pahang owed something over $3,966,500 to Selangor and $1,175,000 to Perak, which had financed it for some years out of surplus revenue. The value of the imports in 1905 was $1,344,346, that of the exports was $3,838,928, thus making a total trade value of $5,183,274. The most valuable export is tin, the value of which in 1905 amounted to $2,820,745. The value of the gutta exported exceeded $140,000, that of dried and salted fish amounted to nearly $70,000, and that of timber to $325,000.

== Military history ==
=== World War I ===
With the threat of Germany, the British Navy was in a drive for expansion. As a contribution, the government and people of the Federated Malay States agreed to finance the commissioning of HMS Malaya; this was a motion proposed in the Federal Council by the Sultan of Perak in 1913 and supported by the Sultan of Selangor. The battleship which cost $25,000,000 (approximately £2,945,709) was one of five of the Queen Elizabeth-class battleship, displacing 31,000 tons, mounting fifteen-inch guns and capable of 25 knots (46 km/h). The most modern ships of their day, they formed the 5th Battle Squadron and fought as such at Jutland in 1916. HMS Malaya was also refurbished and was in service throughout World War II.

=== WWII – Japanese invasion and dissolution ===
After the Japanese landed in Malaya on 8 December 1941, the Japanese forces began their invasion of the Malay Peninsula. Japanese forces began their invasion of the FMS by crossing the Thailand–FMS border at Kroh. Ipoh, the state capital of Perak, fell on 26 December 1941. Kuala Lumpur, the capital of the Federated Malay States and the State of Selangor, was captured on 11 January 1942. Seremban, the state capital of Negeri Sembilan, was captured two days later. Kuantan, in the eastern component state of Pahang, fell on 30 December 1941, meanwhile the capital, Kuala Lipis was taken by the Japanese on 7 January 1942. With the conclusion of the Battle of Gemas on 15 January 1942, the entire FMS was now in Japanese hands.

All of Malaya including Singapore remained under Japanese occupation until the surrender of Japan on 2 September 1945.

== Dissolution ==
The federation was formally dissolved on 1 April 1946, and was incorporated into the Malayan Union thereafter. This in turn was succeeded by the Federation of Malaya in 1948, which gained independence in 1957, and later became Malaysia in 1963.

== Postage stamps ==
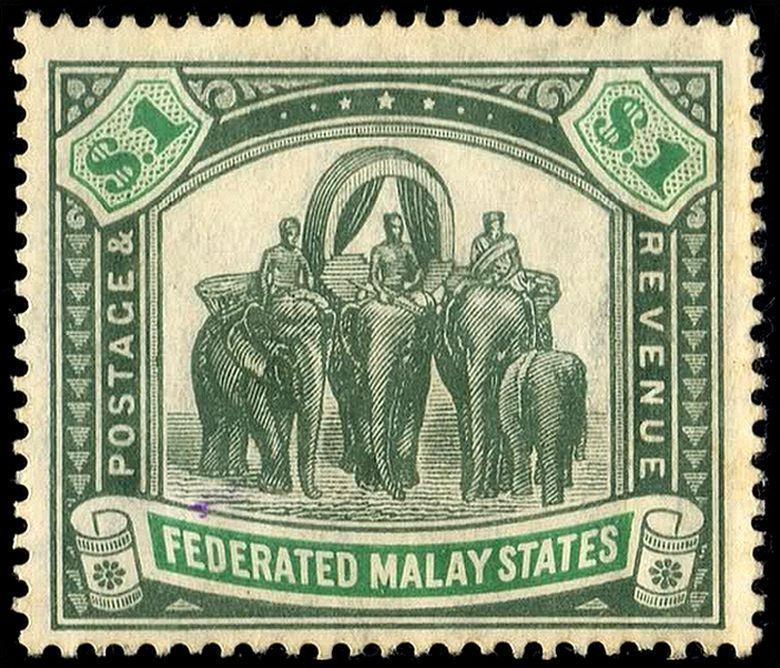
Stamp issued by the Federated Malay States in 1906

While the four states issued their own postage stamps as before, there were additional issues for the Federated States as a whole.

== See also ==
- Unfederated Malay States
- Malay states
- The Straits Settlements
- Federated Malay States Railway
- HMS Malaya
- Pangkor Treaty of 1874
- Federated Malay States Appeals Order in Council, 1912

== Bibliography ==
- Harrison, Cuthbert Woodville. An Illustrated Guide to the Federated Malay States. 1923
- George Palmer Putnam Collection of Amelia Earhart Papers © Purdue University
- Benfield, H. Conway. Handbook of The Federated Malay States sabrizain.org Retrieved 23 January 2018.
