= Manby (surname) =

Manby is a surname, and may refer to:

- Aaron Manby (ironmaster) (1776–1850), ironmaster and civil engineer
- Sir Alan Reeve Manby (1848–1925), Surgeon-Apothecary In Ordinary to the Prince of Wales at Sandringham and later Physician Extraordinary
- Bronwen Manby, British human rights scholar and lobbyist
- Charles Manby (1804–1884), civil engineer and son of Aaron Manby
- Dave Manby, canoeist or kayaker
- Frederic Edward Manby (1845–1891), surgeon and Mayor of Wolverhampton 1888/1889, elder brother to Alan Reeve Manby
- Captain George William Manby FRS (1765–1864), inventor of the Manby Mortar and the first portable pressurised fire extinguisher
- Joel Manby
- Percy Alan Farrer Manby (1877–1940), Supreme Court Judge Straits Settlements and Federation of Malay States
- Thomas Manby (1769–1834), British naval officer

== See also ==
- Manby in Lincolnshire, UK
- Aaron Manby, first iron steamship to go to sea
- James Manby Gully
