= Martin Lister (colonial administrator) =

British colonial administrator

British Resident at Negeri Sembilan
- In office 1889–1891
- Preceded by: Position established
- Succeeded by: W. F. B. Paul

British Resident at Negeri Sembilan
- In office 1895–1897
- Preceded by: Robert Norman Bland (Acting)
- Succeeded by: Ernest Woodford Birch (Acting)

Personal details
- Born: 1857
- Died: 24 February 1897 (aged 39–40) Suez
- Profession: Colonial administrator

Martin Lister (1857 – 24 February 1897) was a British colonial administrator who was the first British Resident of Negeri Sembilan, state of Malaysia.

== Early life ==
Martin Lister was born in 1857, son of Thomas Lister, 3rd Baron Ribblesdale, and Lady Emma Mune, and educated at Cheltenham College. His first job was as a clerk working in the Bank of England. After resigning his position he travelled to Ceylon where he became a “creeper” on a rubber estate before going into partnership with two other English planters. The venture failed when the crop was lost to leaf disease and he moved with his partners to the Malaya peninsula to seek further opportunities in the rubber business.

== Career ==
In 1884 he was recruited to the British colonial administration as Secretary to the Resident of Perak on the recommendation of Frank Swettenham, British Resident of Selangor. In November 1885 he was appointed magistrate at Kuala Selangor and, a month later, magistrate of Ulu Selangor. On 1 January 1886 he became collector and magistrate at Sri Menanti. In October 1887 he was appointed Superintendent Negeri Sembilan, and in December 1889 he was promoted, becoming the first British Resident of Negeri Sembilan.

After being in poor health for several months with heart problems he departed on leave for England on 9 February 1897. Leaving on the steamer Sydney he was taken ill at Suez where he died on 24 February 1897.

== Memorials ==
Memorials commemorating Martin Lister include an arch in Kuala Pilah, Negeri Sembilan, a brass plate in St. Mary's Cathedral, Kuala Lumpur, and a fountain in Sembilan with a plaque bearing the inscription: “1897. A public tribute to the memory of the Honourable Martin Lister, British Resident of Negeri Sembilan”.
