= Victoria Memorial Fountain, Malacca =

Coordinates: 2°11′40″N 102°14′57″E

Victoria Memorial Fountain
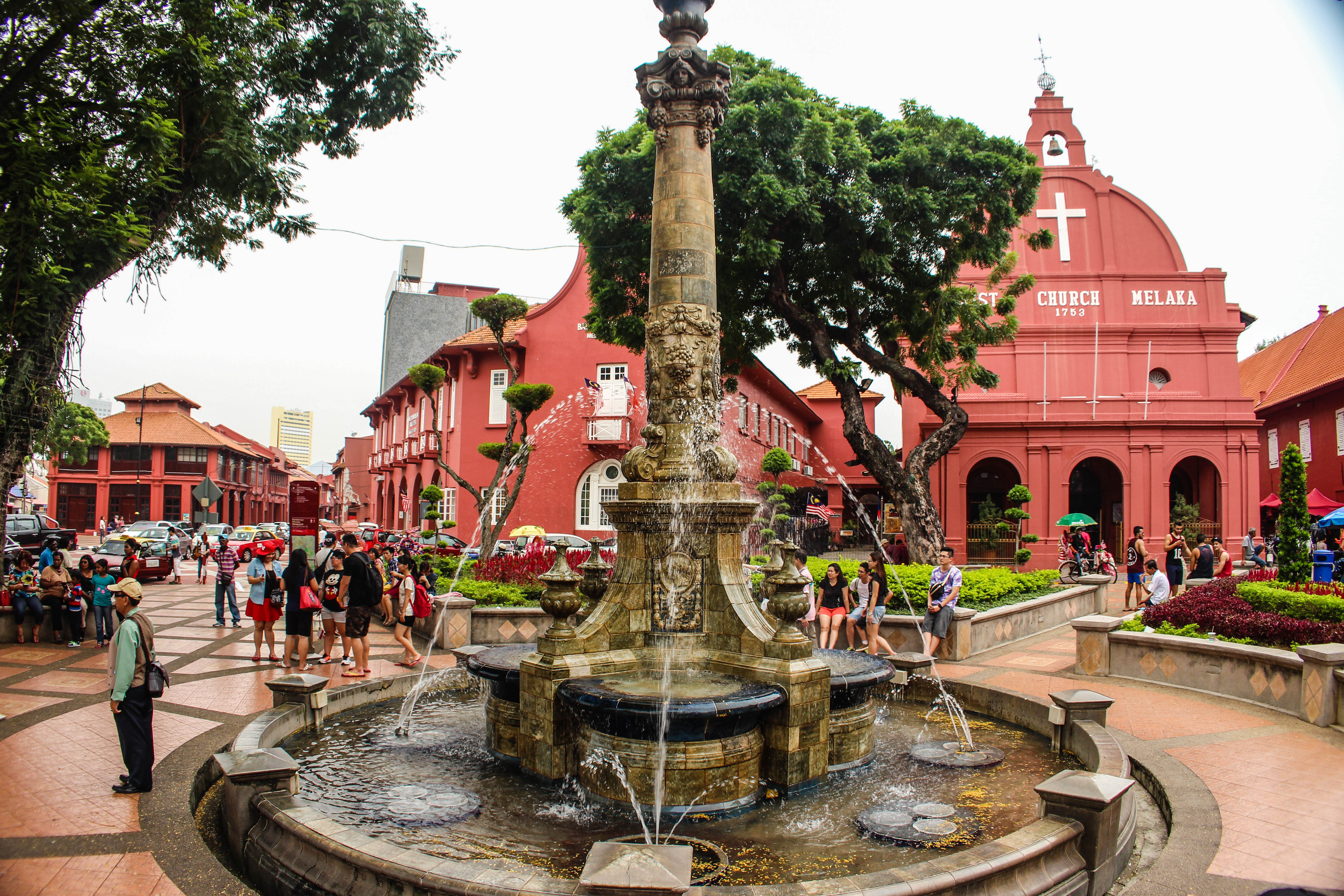
- Interactive map of the Victoria Memorial Fountain area

General information
- Type: Fountain
- Location: Dutch Square, Malacca City, Malaysia
- Completed: 1905; 121 years ago

Design and construction
- Main contractor: Doulton and Sons, London

The Victoria Memorial Fountain is situated in Dutch Square, Jalan Gereja, Malacca City, Malaysia. It was erected as a memorial to the late Queen Victoria.

== History ==
In 1902, the committee of the Victoria Memorial Fund in Singapore invited Malacca to participate in its proposal to erect a new town hall in Singapore as a memorial to Queen Victoria who died on 22 January 1901.

In response, a meeting was held in Malacca of leading Chinese businessmen on the invitation of Towkay Li Keng Liat, and instead it was decided to erect their own memorial in Malacca. It was noted that the sum of $1,500 was already available for the purpose, and that it should take the form of a public fountain.

Public donations were invited led by the Resident Councillor, R. N. Bland, with the list of subscribers and the amounts provided published in the newspapers. Captain Garrard acted as secretary to the fund, and in total approximately $5,000 was collected.

Designs for the fountain were called for locally but none were approved, and Doulton and Sons of London were invited to submit a design which was subsequently accepted with minor alterations.

The fountain was sent out from London to Malacca in pieces, each numbered, with instructions on how to assemble it at the site, and the erection was carried out by a Mr. Lupton, Superintendent of Works and Surveys at the Public Works Department. The cost of the fountain was about $5,000.

The unveiling ceremony took place on 24 May 1905, Empire Day, led by R. N. Bland in front of a large crowd, and his wife turned on the water with a silver key. In his speech, Bland praised the efforts of Li Keng Liat, whose idea it was to erect the fountain, but who never saw it having died shortly before it was unveiled.

== Description ==
The fountain is constructed of glazed, earthenware bricks of greyish green and blue tints. Around the base are four images of the Queen in bas-relief. Above is a plaque which is inscribed with the words: 'Victoria Regina 1837–1901. Erected by the people of Malacca in memory of a great Queen in 1904'.
