= Governor Birch =

Governor Birch may refer to:

- John Birch (soldier) (1615–1691), Governor of Hereford in 1645
- Ernest Woodford Birch (1857–1929), Governor of North Borneo from 1901 to 1903
