= Richard James Wilkinson =

Colonial administrator

Richard James Wilkinson CMG

Governor of Sierra Leone
- In office 9 March 1916 – 4 May 1922
- Monarch: George V
- Preceded by: Sir Edward Marsh Merewether
- Succeeded by: Sir Alexander Ransford Slater

12th Colonial Secretary of Straits Settlements
- In office 1911–1916
- Monarch: George V
- Governor: Sir Arthur Young
- Preceded by: Edward Lewis Brockman
- Succeeded by: Sir Frederick Seton James

British Resident at Negeri Sembilan
- In office 1910–1911
- Monarch: George V
- Preceded by: Douglas Graham Campbell
- Succeeded by: Arthur Henry Lemon

Personal details
- Born: 29 May 1867 Salonika, Ottoman Empire (now Greece)
- Died: 5 December 1941 (aged 74) İzmir, Turkey
- Profession: Colonial Administrator

Richard James Wilkinson CMG (29 May 1867 – 5 December 1941) was a British colonial administrator, scholar of Malay, and historian. The son of a British consul, Richard James Wilkinson was born in 1867 in Salonika (Thessaloniki) in the Ottoman Empire. He studied at Felsted School and was an undergraduate of Trinity College, Cambridge. He was multilingual and had a command of French, German, Greek, Italian and Spanish, and later, Malay and Hokkien which he qualified in, in 1889, while a cadet after joining the Straits Settlements Civil Service. He was an important contributor to the Journal of the Malayan Branch of the Royal Asiatic Society (JMBRAS). On 7 November 1900 Wilkinson presented a collection of Malay manuscripts and printed books to the University of Cambridge Library. He was appointed CMG in 1912.

== Career ==
=== Straits Settlements Civil Service ===
Letter to Christiaan Snouck Hurgronje (1904)

Wilkinson arrived in Singapore in 1889 and was appointed Cadet in the Straits Settlements Civil Service. In December 1895, Wilkinson, who was then a district officer in the Malay States and by then considered well-versed in the native language, joined the Foreign Office. He then rejoined the Colonial Civil Service and was the acting superintendent of education at Penang, after which, by the end of March 1897, he became a police magistrate at Singapore. By January 1899, Wilkinson was serving as the acting inspector of schools. In April 1907, his book Malay Beliefs was released. His An Abridged Malay–English Dictionary (Romanised) was released in August 1908. At that time he was serving as Assistant to the Resident of Perak. In 1911 he was Colonial Secretary for the Straits Settlements and an official member of the Legislative Council. In 1912 he was appointed to the Commission of the Peace (Singapore).

31 March 1914: As the Straits Settlements Colonial Secretary at Singapore, Wilkinson called on the Japanese Consul in Singapore, Fujii Minoru to inform him that the government was banishing 37 nationals identified as pimps from the colonies.

=== Officer Administrating the S.S. Government ===
Wilkinson was appointed the Officer Administering the Government, and Vice Admiral, in June 1914 upon the departure of Governor Sir Arthur Young on leave, and served in those roles until the Governor's return later that year. One of his first acts was to issue, in August, a proclamation informing the citizens of the Straits Settlements that war had "broken out between His Majesty King George V and The Emperor of Austria-Hungary and between their respective subjects."

Wilkinson's short term as head of the Straits Government was not an easy one, and one of the biggest challenges he had to face was the difficult state of the finances of the Federated Malay States.

There was a cash deficit of $30,000,000, although its assets exceeded its liabilities. The bulk of the assets were in the form of securities purchased that could not readily be disposed of. In short, the Federation faced a liquidity or cashflow problem. Projects that had been heavily spent on included the railway line running through the Peninsula to Siam (present-day Thailand) and the construction of the battleship HMS Malaya. The application by the High Commissioner to the Secretary of State for the Colonies had not yielded any immediate results: the Secretary of State had advised deferring the loan to 1915 owing to the state of the money market in Europe at that time. And with war having broken out, it was not likely for the Federation to be able to secure a loan in 1915 either.

The press noted that Wilkinson was "a man of exceptional financial capacity, and at the critical moment in Malaya, after the declaration of war," had "revealed a grasp of administrative finance, and even of the intricacies of banking, commerce, and exchange which astound men whose whole lives are given to such things."

Taking the responsibility on his own shoulders, Wilkinson saved Malaya from, as the papers put it, "one of the worst disasters in its history." Wilkinson resolved that the Straits Settlements Government would buy F.M.S. tin at a fixed price, which stabilised the market, and Malaya's finances, at a time when the metal market in London closed down owing to the war. The smelting companies by then had acknowledged that there was a limit to their ability to purchase ore, when there did not appear to be any market to sell to. The Straits Government also decided to make advances to companies against stock, or other securities, averting the fear and anxiety being experienced then. He had employed the resources of the Straits Settlements to preserve the industrial equilibrium of the Federated Malay States. The papers described his position at that time as "one of extraordinary delicacy and difficulty for an acting Governor," and noted that if he had not taken on the responsibility of stabilising Malayan industry, "there would have been greater disaster than most folk care to acknowledge." F.M.S. had overextended itself, committing to many large projects including the H.M.S. Malaya and the railway line up north, and a bridge connecting Johore and Singapore, and then discovering it could not pay for these. Wilkinson had made their problem, his problem, and fixed it.

Despite all of that, he managed to have published by December 1914 a collection of Malay pantun (poetry) that he had worked on together with Richard Olaf Winstedt.

=== Departure from Singapore ===
Wilkinson was most loved by the Muslim community of Singapore, who feted him for days as he was readying to depart Singapore to take up his new role as Governor of Sierra Leone in January 1916. A dinner was thrown by the Moslem Association [of Singapore] on 15 December 1915, at the Victoria Memorial Hall. The guest list read represented almost everyone who mattered in S.S. and F.M.S. administration and commerce. Syed Omar Alsagoff received the guests, after which Ali Khan Surati read the English text of the association's address to Mr. Wilkinson, while M. A. Patail read the Malay version. The address, in a decorated silver cylinder mounted on an ebony plinth, was then presented to Wilkinson by Alsagoff. Alsagoff then threw him a garden party at Alsagoff's home at Bukit Tunggal, Thompson Road. The band of the sultan of Johore had been lent for this occasion. Entertainment included performances of ronggeng, mak yong, silat, wayang kulit, and Indian dance, singing and juggling. Almost a thousand people were present on the grounds. Syed Mohamed Alsagoff read the address in English. It was also read in Malay after which it was presented in a silver casket. By that time Wilkinson had already received several addresses from the Indian Muslim community and those of other nationalities in Singapore.

=== Governor of Sierra Leone ===
As governor of Sierra Leone, Wilkinson insisted that Africans receive the same pay as Europeans when doing the same work. The previous governor of the colony, Sir Edward Marsh Merewether, had recommended this rule change be enacted and Wilkinson enforced it. He also expanded the postal service in the colony and hired Africans to work on it. One of Wilkinson's private secretaries was the colonial administrator Paul Shuffrey.

=== Career summary ===
- 1896–1897: Acting Director of Education, Penang
- 1897–1898: Police Magistrate, Singapore
- 1898–1900: Acting Inspector General of Schools in the Straits Settlements, Singapore
- 1902–1903: Transferred to the Dindings, Perak
- 1903–1906: Acting Inspector of Schools for the Federated Malay States
- 1906–1910: Secretary General to the British Resident (Ernest Woodford Birch) in Perak
- 1910–1911: British Resident at Negeri Sembilan
- 1911–1914: Colonial Secretary, Straits Settlements
- 1914–1914 Officer Administering the Government of the Straits Settlements
- 1914–1916: Colonial Secretary, Straits Settlements
- 1916–1922: Governor, Sierra Leone 9 March 1916 – 4 May 1922

== Legacy ==
=== Institutions ===
He initiated the establishment of the Malay Training College in Malacca in 1900 which was eventually succeeded in 1922 by the Sultan Idris Training College (currently known as the Sultan Idris Education University) at Tanjung Malim, Perak.

In 1905 he founded the Malay Residential School, later known as the Malay College at Kuala Kangsar (MCKK)

=== Malay orthography ===
Wilkinson's A Malay-English Dictionary (1901) used a Latin spelling system that established the foundations of modern Malay orthography.

=== Books authored, edited and compiled ===
- The education of Asiatics, 1901
- Code for grant-in-aid schools and departmental instruction to inspecting officers, 1905
- The Achehnese, Published by EJ Brill, 1906 with CS Hurgronje and AWS O'Sullivan
- Malay beliefs, Published by Luzac & Co, 1906
- Kesah pĕlayaran Abdullah (Voyages of Munshi Abdullah), 1907
- Malay literature, Published by the FMS Government Press, 1907
- An Abridged Malay-English Dictionary (romanised), Published by the FMS Government Press, 1908
- The incidents of Malay life, Printed by J. Russell at the FMS Govt. Press, 1908
- Life and Customs, Part 1: The Incidents of Malay Life (1908)
- Papers on Malay Subjects. Published by Printed by J. Russell at the F.M.S. Government Press, 1908–11, under the direction of the Government of the Federated Malay States. General editor: R.J. Wilkinson. Numerous volumes.
- Notes on the Negri Sembilan, Published by the FMS Government Press, 1911
- Malay grammar, Published by The Clarendon Press, Oxford, 1913, with Sir Richard Olaf Winstedt (1878–1966)
- Pantun Melayu, Singapore: Methodist Publishing House, 1914 (Malay Literature Series). Co-author: Richard Olaf Winstedt.
- A vocabulary of central Sakai (dialect of the aboriginal communities in the Gopeng Valley), Printed by J. Brown at the Federated Malay States Govt. Press, 1915
- A history of the peninsular Malays, with chapters on Perak & Selangor, Published by Kelly & Walsh 1920
- An English-Malay dictionary: roman characters, 1932. Republished by Kelly & Walsh, 1939, with RO Winstedt
- A history of Perak, 1932. Republished by the Malaysian Branch of the Royal Asiatic Society, 1974, with RO Winstedt and SWE Maxwell

== See also ==
- Chung Keng Quee
- Arthur Nonus Birch
- Ngah Ibrahim
- Kingdom of Kapisa
- Pengkalan Kempas Historical Complex

Political offices
Preceded by Douglas Graham Campbell	British Resident at Negeri Sembilan; 1910–1911	Succeeded by Arthur Henry Lemon
Government offices
Preceded by Edward Lewis Brockman	Colonial Secretary, Straits Settlements; 1911–1916	Succeeded by Sir Frederick Seton James
Preceded by Sir Edward Marsh Merewether	Governor of Sierra Leone; 1916–1922	Succeeded by Sir Alexander Ransford Slater
