= William Rodger =

English cricketer

William Wallace Rodger (13 January 1847 – 23 October 1888), known from 1887 William Wallace Rodger-Cunliffe, was an English lawyer, billiards player and first-class cricketer who played for Kent County Cricket Club.

== Early life ==
Rodger was born in 1847 at Gloucester Place, Marylebone in London. He was the son of Sir Robert Rodger and his wife Sophia and was educated at Eton College and Exeter College, Oxford. His father was a Justice of the Peace and High Sheriff of Kent who bought Hadlow Castle in Kent where the family lived.

== Cricket ==
Rodger did not play cricket for the school XI or for the university, but made his first-class cricket debut for the Gentlemen of Kent in 1865 after graduating from Oxford. He played during the 1865 and 1866 Canterbury Cricket Weeks, a significant social occasion at the time, before going on to play 17 matches for the Kent county team between 1867 and 1873. His highest score of 32 runs was made against Sussex in 1873, the only time he passed 30 in an innings. Rodger played club cricket regularly until 1873, his teams including Tunbridge Wells and The Mote as well as Gentlemen of Kent.

== Family ==
After being called to the bar at the Middle Temple in 1874, Rodger played little club cricket and none at first-class level. He married Annie Kentfield in Brussels in 1874; the couple had two children and were divorced in 1880. He inherited Hadlow Castle on his father's death in 1882 and changed his surname to Rodger-Cunliffe in 1887 as a condition of his mother's will. He married Jeanne Schmedding, again in Brussels, in January 1888 but later in the year was committed to Barming Asylum where he died, after a short illness, in October aged 41. A daughter was born after his death.

As well as playing cricket, Rodger was a notable billiards player, twice winning the Champion Cue. His brother, John Pickersgill Rodger, played a single first-class match for Kent and was later Governor of the Gold Coast.

== Bibliography ==
- Carlaw, Derek (2020). Kent County Cricketers, A to Z: Part One (1806–1914) (PDF). Cardiff: ACS.
