= William Hood Treacher =

Colonial administrator

Sir William Hood Treacher
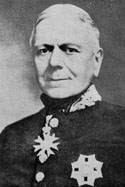
- Sir William Hood Treacher

1st British Governor of North Borneo
- In office 26 August 1881 – 1887
- Monarch: Queen Victoria
- Preceded by: Post created
- Succeeded by: Sir William Maunder Crocker

6th British Resident of Selangor
- In office 1892–1896
- Preceded by: Sir William Edward Maxwell
- Succeeded by: Sir John Pickersgill Rodger

6th British Resident of Perak
- In office 1896–1902
- Preceded by: Sir Frank Swettenham
- Succeeded by: Sir John Pickersgill Rodger

Personal details
- Born: 1 December 1849; Wellington, England
- Died: 3 May 1919 (aged 69)

Sir William Hood Treacher KCMG (1 December 1849 – 3 May 1919) was a British colonial administrator in Borneo and the Straits Settlements. He founded the Anglo Chinese School in Klang on 10 March 1892.

== Family ==
Treacher was the fourth son of Rev. Joseph Skipper Treacher, MA, Vicar of Sandford-on-Thames, by his first wife Pauline Louise Blanche Pierret. His father was an Oxford graduate.

On 19 April 1866, at the age of sixteen, Treacher matriculated at St Mary Hall, Oxford, where he held a Scholarship for four years. He graduated BA in 1870 and in 1881 proceeded to MA by seniority.

Cousin of John Gavaron Treacher, a doctor in Sarawak from 1843 and Colonial Surgeon to Labuan from 1848, William arrived in Labuan via Singapore in 1871 to be Acting Police Magistrate, becoming Colonial Secretary of Labuan in 1873, going on to become the first Governor of North Borneo (1881–1887); Resident of Selangor (1892–1896); the sixth British Resident of Perak (1896–1902); and second Resident-General of British Malaya (1901–1904). His grand-nephew, Sir John Treacher rose to be an Admiral in the Royal Navy.

Treacher married Elizabeth Frances Cornelia Rumsey (known as Leila), the daughter of the Rev. J. Rumsey, at Ss Philip & James's Church in Oxford on 25 April 1881. Their daughter Leila Treacher was born in Singapore in 1882.

== Sources ==
- Walford's County Families of the United Kingdom (1920)
- The Suffrage Annual and Women's Who's who (1913), Stanley Paul
- Treacher, Sir John (2004), Life at Full Throttle: From Wardroom to Boardroom, Pen & Sword Maritime, ISBN 978-1844151349

Government offices
New title	British Governor of North Borneo; 1881–1887	Succeeded by Sir William Maunder Crocker
Preceded by Sir William Edward Maxwell	British Resident of Selangor; 1892–1896	Succeeded by Sir John Pickersgill Rodger
Preceded by Sir Frank Swettenham	British Resident of Perak; 1896–1902	Succeeded by Sir John Pickersgill Rodger
