= William Edward Maxwell =

Colonial Administrator

Sir William Edward Maxwell KCMG
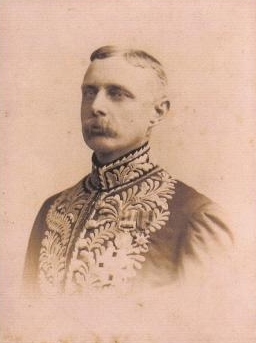

Governor of the Gold Coast
- In office 7 April 1895 – 6 December 1897
- Monarch: Queen Victoria
- Preceded by: William Brandford Griffith
- Succeeded by: Frederick Mitchell Hodgson

Acting Governor of the Straits Settlements
- In office 30 August 1893 – 1 February 1894
- Monarch: Queen Victoria
- Preceded by: Sir Cecil Clementi Smith
- Succeeded by: Sir Charles Mitchell

6th Colonial Secretary of the Straits Settlements
- In office 9 March 1892 – 1895
- Monarch: Queen Victoria
- Governor: Sir Cecil Clementi Smith; Sir Charles Mitchell
- Preceded by: Sir John Frederick Dickson; Arthur Philip Talbot (acting)
- Succeeded by: James Alexander Swettenham

British Resident of Selangor
- In office 1889–1892
- Preceded by: Frank Athelstane Swettenham; John Pickersgill Rodger (acting)
- Succeeded by: William Hood Treacher

Personal details
- Born: 5 August 1846
- Died: 10 December 1897 (aged 51) sea off Grand Canary
- Spouse: Lillias Grant Aberigh-Mackay (m. 1870)
- Children: Sir William George Maxwell
- Parents: Sir Peter Benson Maxwell (father); Frances Dorothea (mother)
- Occupation: Colonial administrator

Sir William Edward Maxwell, KCMG (5 August 1846 – 14 December 1897) was a British colonial official who served as colonial secretary of the Straits Settlements and governor of the Gold Coast, then a British colony.

== Early days ==
Born on 5 August 1846, William Edward Maxwell was the son of Sir Peter Benson Maxwell, the chief justice of the Straits Settlements.

== Career ==
=== Straits Settlements ===
Maxwell followed his father into the legal profession, and also served in the courts of the Straits Settlements.

In 1883, Maxwell was appointed the commissioner of land titles in the Straits Settlements, to be a member of the Executive and Legislative Councils of those settlements. In 1889, he was appointed the resident of Selangor. He became the colonial secretary of the Straits Settlements in 1892, and was acting governor from 30 August 1893 to 1 February 1894.

=== Anglo-Ashanti War ===
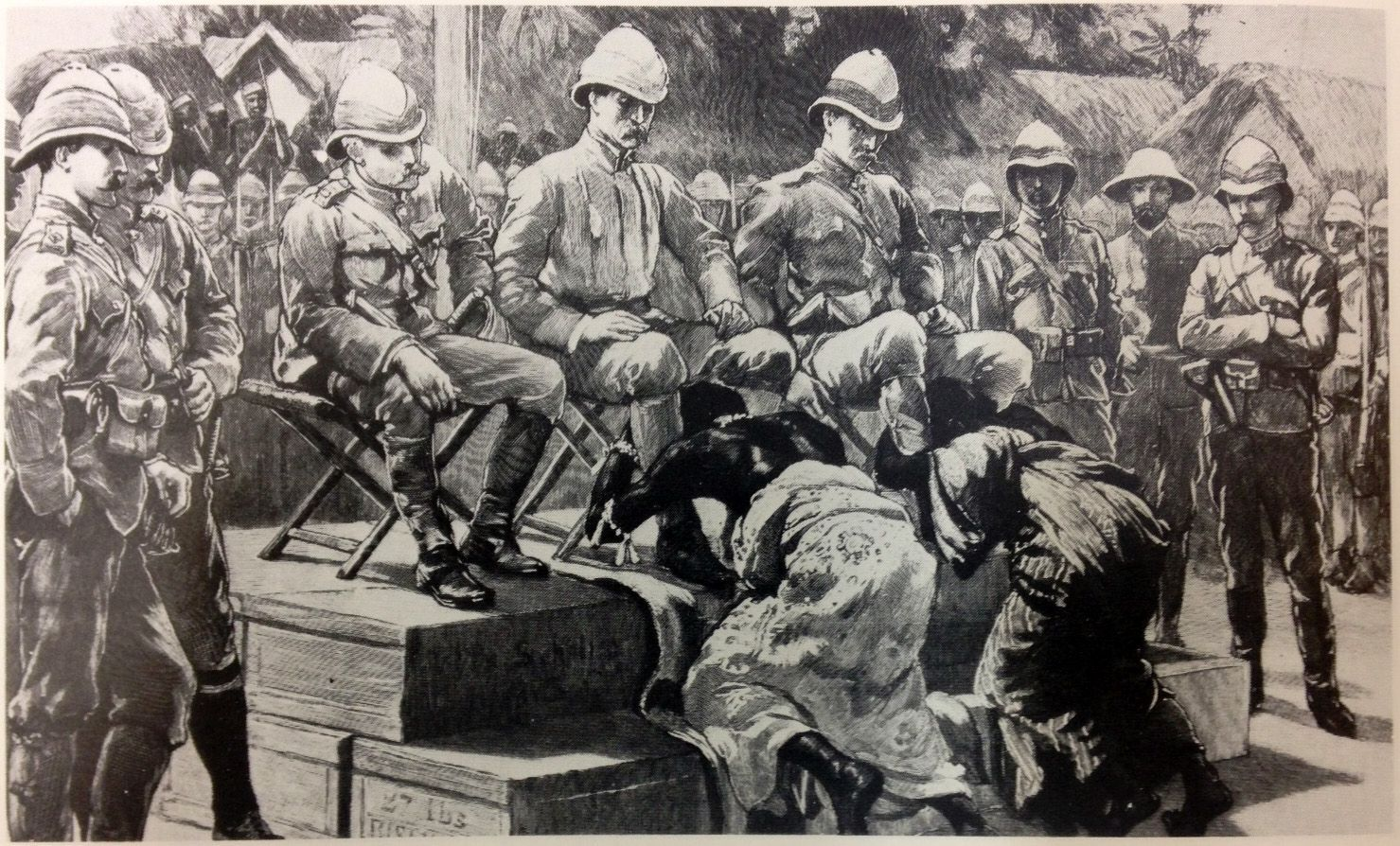
Maxwell's humiliation of Prempeh prior to his exile

In 1895, Maxwell was promoted to the governorship of the Gold Coast (now Ghana). Under his governorship the British declared war on the Asante Empire, the fourth Anglo-Ashanti War, known as the "Second Ashanti Expedition" in 1895.

An earlier treaty signed by the Asantes in 1874, the terms of which were widely considered absurd and unenforceable, was invoked by Maxwell. When the Asante king, Asantehene Agyeman Prempeh, could not meet the terms, Maxwell had him arrested, together with his mother, father, brother, uncles and a dozen advisors. They were later exiled to the Seychelles, not returning to the Gold Coast (now Ghana) until the 1920s.

== Death and legacy ==
Suffering malaria, Maxwell died at sea off the Canary Islands and was buried at sea. He had married Lillias Grant Aberigh-Mackay in 1870, and left issue. At the Holy Trinity Cathedral, Accra in Ghana (formerly the Gold Coast) a memorial tablet to him exists. It reads:

"To the glory of God in memory of Sir William Maxwell KCMG Governor of the Gold Coast Colony, who sacrificed his life to his unselfish devotion to duty. Under his rule the Kingdom of Ashanti was brought under British control. In impaired health he undertook an expedition to the northern territories of the colony to extend peace and protection to slave raided tribes and contracted fever of which to the undying regret of all who knew him died on the voyage home. Born 5th August 1846. Died 14th December 1897. 'Neither count I my life dear unto myself so that I might finish my course.'"

An excerpt from the Straits Branch of the Royal Asiatic Society 1899 In Memoriam reads:

"The work he did for the Society is not, however, to be only judged by what he did under its auspices and in its name. He contributed to the Royal Asiatic Society's journal some interesting notes on Malay legends, and he wrote a Manual of the Malay Language which has done much to facilitate a scholarly acquisition of the idioms in which he took so deep an interest. He was in some measure acquainted with Arabic and Sanskrit, but will best be remembered for his work in connection with indigenous elements of the Malay language, it's traditions and folklore. He collected a fine library of Malay MSS., which he has bequeathed to the Royal Asiatic Society. A great advocate of scholarly method, he did much to draw attention to the material that exists, in Dutch and other foreign languages, for the proper study of Malay."

Under the terms of his last will, he requested his niece to burn his private letters and diaries without examination, which was undertaken.

== Awards and honours ==
Maxwell was invested with Companion of the Most Distinguished Order of St. Michael and St. George (CMG) in 1885 and Knight Commander of the Most Distinguished Order of St. Michael and St. George (KCMG) in 1896.

== Published works ==
- A Manual of the Malay Language,

=== Straits Branch of the Royal Asiatic Society ===
List

- Aboriginal tribes of Perak, IV. 46—50.
- Achin, Letter of King of, to James IL N.& Q., III. 63.
- Bentinck, Visit of Lord William, to Penang in 1828. N.& Q., II. 31.
- Birth Ceremonies in Perak, N.& Q., III, 74—79.
- Cambodia, French Land Decree in, XV, 81—92.
- Ceremonies when shooting rapids, N.& Q., IV. 124,
- Changkat Rambian, Legend of, N.& Q., I. 19—22,
- Chiri (formula recited at installation of Malay chiefs), X. 287—289.
- "Cochin China, Survey question in," M. Camouilly, Translation of, XVIII. 271—294.
- Cockup, N.& Q., IV, 100.
- Daun tiga ‘lei, N.& Q., I. 23—34,
- Dindings, Dutch occupations of. XI. 169—170.
- Dress, Fighting, of Malays, N.& Q., II. 53.
- Elephant, Modes of sitting in driving, N.& Q., I. 10.
- Elephants, Management of, N.& Q., II. 32—36.
- Faure’s Dictionary, Notes on criticism of, by Devic and Marre. XII. 257—259.
- Feudal tenure in the Dutch East Indies in I7th Century (extract from Plakaatbock by Van de Chijs), XVI, 436—438.
- Folklore of Malays, VII. 11—29.
- Galgal, N.& Q., IV. 100.
- Ganju, N.& Q., I. 22—23.
- Gelagah nasi, N.& Q., II. 48.
- Hikayat Seri Rama, Preface to, LV. 1—99.
- Howdah, Malay, N.& Q., II. 52.
- Jalibut, N.& Q., IV. 99—100.
- Jam, N.& Q., IV. 101.
- Johor, N.& Q., I. 10.
- Ketiar, N.& Q., IV. 97—98.
- Kramat, A. Malay, II, 236—238.
- Kubang Aji, Legend of, N.& Q., II. 49—50.
- Law and Customs of Malays with reference to tenure of land, XIII. 75—220.
- Laws relating to slavery among Malays, with extracts from Perak Code and Malayan laws of Johore, XII. 247—297,
- Loads, Mode of carrying, N.& Q., IV. 121.
- Magic circle, N.& Q. II. 49.
- Malays, N.& Q., IV. 98.
- Malay, Transliteration of, in Roman character, IX. 141—152.
- Malay Transliteration, Notes to memorandum on, X. 282—284.
- Mantra, N.& Q., IV. 124—126,
- Mantra Sandaran, N.& Q., II. 46—47.
- Marong Mahawangsa, Extract from, IX. 85—89.
- Medicine N.& Q., I, 23—24.
- Menangkabau Code, N.& Q., II. 36—38.
- Nakhoda Ragam, N.& Q., I. 22.
- "New Guinea, "Work and Adventure in 1877-1885", Chambers and Gill, Review of, XV. 145—154 A,
- Ophir, N.& Q., I. 8.
- Orchids, Origin of. N.& Q., II, 51.
- Pagar, N.& Q., IV, 98
- Panjat, N.& Q. IV, 118—120.
- Patani frontier, Journey on foot to, in 1876, to capture Dato Maharaja Lela of Perak, IX. 1—67.
- Pelas Negri, N.& Q., III. 80—81.
- Perak and Penang in 1829, N.& Q., II. 29—30,
- Perak, Dutch in. N.& Q., II. 3l; X. 245—268,
- Perak, English trade with, N.& Q., IV, 103.
- Perak, History of, from native sources, IX. 85—108; XIV, 305—321.
- Perak, Malay titles in Ulu. N.& Q., Ill. 70.
- Perak manuscripts, Notes on two, II. 183—193.
- Perak Salsilah or Book of descent, IX. 95—108; XXIV, 305—321.
- Perak, Titles and offices of the officers of state of, N.& Q., I. 6-8,
- Portuguese origin, Malay words of, N.& Q., III. 64—70,
- Prince or princess of bamboo (Japanese folklore concerning), XVIII. 357—358.
- Proverbs, Malay, I, 85—98; II, 136—162; III. 19-51; XI. 31-82.
- Province Wellesley, Antiquities of, I. ll4.
- Province Wellesley, Journey from, to Selama in 1874, XIX. 120—123.
- Pulau Lankawi (map), XIX. 27—33.
- Pulau Tunggal, Legend of, N.& Q., II. 50—51.
- Rajah Ambong, Malay fairy tale, text and translation, XIX. 55—71.
- Raja Donan, Malay fairy tale, text and translation, XVIII. 240—269.
- Raja Haji (attack on Malacca by Rhio Malays), Romanised text and translation, XXII. 173—224.
- Raja of the bamboo, N.& Q., IV. 121—123.
- Rembau, N.& Q., III. 63.
- Sang Kalembai, N.& Q., II. 51.
- Seals of Johore and Pahang in 1819, N.& Q., IV. 114.
- Selangor, Ruling family of, extract from Selangor Administration Report, 1889, XXII. 321—329.
- Senna, N.& Q., IV. 116—118.
- Serawa Langut, N.& Q., II. 48.
- Shamanism in Perak, XII, 222—232.
- Singapore, Founding of, N.& Q., IV. 104—113.
- Spirits and Demons, Belief in, N.& Q., IV. 104—113.
- Sri Rama, Malay fairy tale founded on the Ramayana, Text and translation, XVII. 86—115.
- Sulu vocabulary, Notes to, by T. H. Haynes, XVI. 321—384,
- Temikei, Mendikei, Kamendikei, N.& Q., IV. 98.
- Toh Kuala Bidor, Legend of, N.& Q., II. 47 — 48.

Government offices
Preceded by William Brandford Griffith	Governor of the Gold Coast; 1895 – 1897	Succeeded by Frederick Mitchell Hodgson
Preceded by Sir Cecil Clementi Smith	Acting Governor of the Straits Settlements; 1893 – 1894	Succeeded by Sir Charles Mitchell
Preceded by Sir John Frederick Dickson; Arthur Philip Talbot (acting)	Colonial Secretary of the Straits Settlements; 1892 – 1895	Succeeded by James Alexander Swettenham
Preceded by Frank Athelstane Swettenham; John Pickersgill Rodger (acting)	British Resident of Selangor; 1889–1892	Succeeded by William Hood Treacher
