= John Pickersgill Rodger =

British colonial administrator

Sir John Pickersgill Rodger KCMG CMG

Governor of the Gold Coast
- In office 3 March 1904 – 1 September 1910
- Monarchs: Edward VII; George V
- Preceded by: Herbert Bryan (Acting)
- Succeeded by: Herbert Bryan (Acting)

7th British Resident of Perak
- In office 13 December 1901 – 9 February 1904
- Preceded by: Sir William Hood Treacher
- Succeeded by: Sir Ernest Woodford Birch

British Resident of Selangor
- In office July 1896 – 12 December 1901
- Preceded by: Sir William Hood Treacher
- Succeeded by: Henry Conway Belfield

First British Resident of Pahang
- In office October 1888 – January 1896
- Preceded by: Post created
- Succeeded by: Hugh Clifford

British Resident of Selangor
- In office 8 February 1884 – 8 January 1888
- Preceded by: Sir Frank Athelstane Swettenham
- Succeeded by: William Edward Maxwell

Personal details
- Born: 12 February 1851 Marylebone, London
- Died: 19 September 1910 (aged 59) Mayfair, London

Sir John Pickersgill Rodger, KCMG (12 February 1851 – 19 September 1910) was a British colonial administrator. He served as British resident to several Malay states, before ending his career as Governor of the Gold Coast from 1904 to 1910.

== Early life ==
Rodger was born in 1851 at Marylebone in London, the second son of Sir Robert Rodger and his wife Sophia (née Pickersgill). His father was a landowner, magistrate and Justice of the Peace who purchased Hadlow Castle in Kent where the family lived, and was the High Sheriff of Kent in 1865. He was educated at Eton College, where he was in the cricket XI, and went up to Christ Church, Oxford in 1870.

== Career ==
Rodger was called to the English Bar at the Inner Temple in 1877 but practised little in Britain and joined the Colonial Service. In 1882 he was appointed as the Chief Magistrate and Commissioner of Lands at Selangor and was the British resident of Pahang, Selangor and Perak, all in British Malaya, before being appointed as the Governor of the Gold Coast in 1904. He was influential in the development of infrastructure whilst in post in West Africa, including the building of a harbour at Accra and of beginning the building of a railway to serve the cocoa industry around Kumasi.

Rodger was appointed CMG in 1899 and knighted KCMG in 1904.

== Cricket ==
Rodger was a cricketer who played one first-class match for Kent County Cricket Club in 1870 after leaving Eton, playing against Marylebone Cricket Club (MCC) during Canterbury Cricket Week. He scored a total of seven runs in the match. Although he played some cricket at Oxford he did not make the University XI. He played club cricket for MCC, Band of Brothers and the Gentlemen of Kent. His brother, William Rodger, also played for Kent.

== Family ==
Rodger married Maria Tyser in 1872; the couple had one daughter. He died in September 1910 in London shortly after retiring from the Colonial Service due to ill health. He was aged 59.

== Cultural depictions ==
Rodger was depicted by Mark Geoffrry in the 2022 Malaysian epic Mat Kilau.

== Bibliography ==
- Carlaw, Derek (2020). Kent County Cricketers, A to Z: Part One (1806–1914) (PDF). Cardiff: ACS.

Political offices
Preceded by Sir Frank Athelstane Swettenham	British Resident of Selangor; 1884–1888	Succeeded by William Edward Maxwell
Preceded by Post created	British Resident of Pahang; 1888–1896	Succeeded by Hugh Clifford
Preceded by Sir William Hood Treacher	British Resident of Selangor; 1896–1901	Succeeded by Henry Conway Belfield
Preceded by Sir William Hood Treacher	British Resident of Perak; 1901–1904	Succeeded by Sir Ernest Woodford Birch
Government offices
Preceded by Herbert Bryan	Governor of the Gold Coast; 1904–1910	Succeeded by Herbert Bryan
