= George Maxwell (colonial administrator) =

British colonial administrator (1871–1959)

Sir George Maxwell KBE CMG
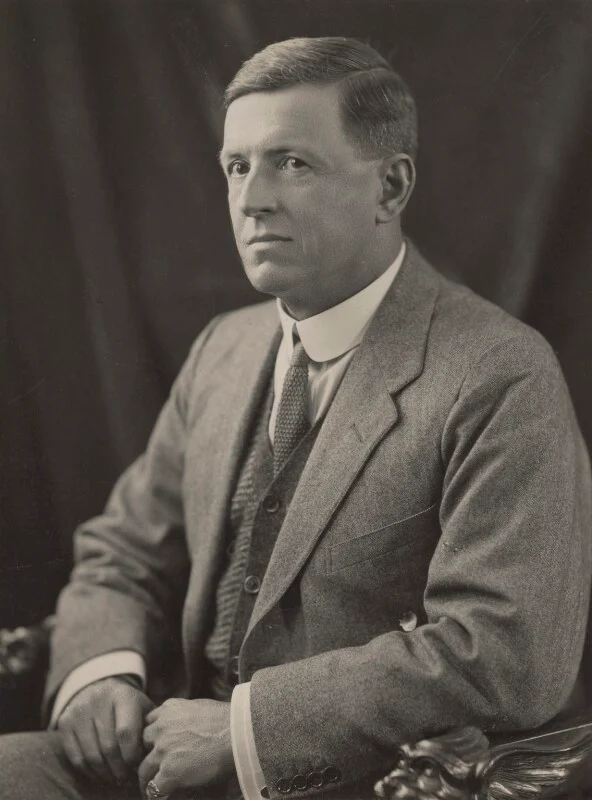

Chief Secretary to the Government of the FMS
- In office 1920–1926
- Preceded by: Sir Edward Lewis Brockman
- Succeeded by: Sir William Peel

British Resident of Perak
- In office 1919–1920
- Preceded by: Sir Reginald George Watson
- Succeeded by: Sir William James Parke Hume

British Adviser for Kedah
- In office 1909–1915
- Preceded by: none, post created
- Succeeded by: Littleton Edward Pipe-Wolferstan
- In office 1918–1919
- Preceded by: G.A. Hall
- Succeeded by: Malcolm Stewart Hannibal McArthur

Personal details
- Born: 9 June 1871 Malacca, Straits Settlements
- Died: 22 August 1959 (aged 88) Shoreham, Sussex, England
- Spouse: Lady Evelyn Maxwell (m. 1902)
- Parents: Sir William Edward Maxwell (father); Lilias Grant Mackay (mother)

Sir William George Maxwell KBE CMG (9 June 1871 – 22 August 1959) was a British colonial administrator in British Malaya and the Straits Settlements.

== Biography ==
He was the eldest son of Sir William Edward Maxwell and Lilias Grant Mackay.

George Maxwell entered the service of Perak's government as a junior officer in 1891. He then progressed to Assistant District Magistrate and Registrar of Courts in Kinta Valley (Perak). He was also the Assistant Secretary to the Government of Perak, Acting Collector of Land Revenue in Larut, Registrar of Titles and Warden of Mines in Northern Perak and Acting Senior Magistrate for Selangor, Negeri Sembilan, and Perak. In 1904, he was transferred to the Civil Service of Straits Settlements and was acting Commissioner of the Court of Requests in Singapore.

He was posted as the District Officer of Dinding, Perak, Solicitor General (1906). On 9 July 1909 the Bangkok Treaty, which was ratified by the British and Siamese, made Kedah part of the British Empire and he was then appointed British Adviser to Kedah (1909–1915) and (1918–1919). He was also the British Resident of Perak (1919–1920) and Chief Secretary of Federated Malay States (1920–1926).

He served as one of the seven members of the Advisory Committee of Experts on Slavery of the League of Nations from 1934 to 1939.

== Marriage ==
Sir William George Maxwell married his cousin Florence Evelyn daughter of Walter F Stevenson on 28 August 1902 in St. Mary's Church, Hendon, Middlesex.

== Contributions and honours ==
Maxwell Hill in Taiping, Perak was named after him.

On 29 November 1929, he opened the Sultan Idris Training College in Perak and making it the highest institution of learning exclusively for the Malays at that time. To remember his contributions in education SMK Maxwell (Maxwell School) in Kuala Lumpur was named after him.

He was invested with Companion of the Order of St Michael and St George (CMG) in 1915 and Knight Commander of the Order of the British Empire (KBE) in 1924.

- United Kingdom
  - Knight Commander of the Order of the British Empire (KBE) – Sir (1924 Birthday Honours)
  - Companion of the Order of St Michael and St George (CMG) (1915)

== Sources and references ==
- WorldStatesmen – Malaysia
- Maxwell family tree

Political offices
New title	British Adviser for Kedah; 1909–1915	Succeeded by Littleton Edward Pipe-Wolferstan
Preceded by G A Hall	British Adviser for Kedah; 1918–1919	Succeeded by Malcolm S H McArthur
Preceded by Sir R G Watson	British Resident of Perak; 1919–1920	Succeeded by Sir William J P Hume
Government offices
Preceded by Sir E L Brockman	Chief Secretary to the Government of the FMS; 1920–1926	Succeeded by Sir William Peel
