= John Vincent Cowgill =

British colonial administrator (1888–1959)

John Vincent Cowgill CMG MC
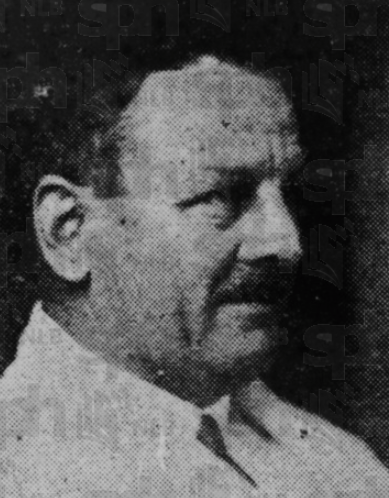
- Cowgill in 1939

British Resident of Negeri Sembilan
- In office 1939 – 1942 (Japanese prisoner)
- Preceded by: Gordon Lupton Ham
- Succeeded by: William Alexander Gordon-Hall (1946)

Personal details
- Born: 19 July 1888
- Died: 16 October 1959 (aged 71) Harrogate
- Education: All Souls College, Oxford
- Occupation: Colonial administrator

John Vincent Cowgill (19 July 1888 – 16 October 1959) was a British colonial administrator who was British Resident of Negeri Sembilan, Federated Malay States, from 1939 to 1942.

== Early life and education ==
Cowgill was born on 19 July 1888, the son of Rev Harry Cowgill. He was educated at Durham School and All Souls College, Oxford.

== Career ==
Cowgill joined the Malayan Civil Service in 1911 as a cadet and was attached to the Chinese Protectorate. In 1915, he enlisted and served in the war in Europe as a brigade signalling officer and rose to the rank of lieutenant. He was mentioned in dispatches and awarded the Military Cross.

After the war he returned to Malaya and served in various posts including: Revenue Auditor (1919); acting District Officer, Temerloh (1920); officer in the Chinese Protectorate in Kuala Lumpur where he served as chairman of the relief Committee assisting the destitute (1921); adviser in Terengganu (1923); Collector of Land Revenue, Kuala Lumpur (1927); Commissioner of Lands (1928); acting District Officer, Klang (1929); District Officer, Kinta District (1930); Secretary to the Resident, Perak (1932); Chairman of the Sanitary Board, Kuala Lumpur (1934–35); Director General of Posts and Telegraphs (1935–1939).

In 1939, he was appointed British Resident of Negeri Sembilan. During the Japanese occupation he was interned in Singapore from 1942 to 1945. After the war he returned to Malaya where from 1948 to 1949 he served as officer at the Joint Salaries Commission, Singapore and chairman of the Special Salaries Committee before he retired.

== Personal life and death ==
Cowgill married Lillian Bonehill in 1934. She died in 1941 aboard the S.S.Kuala during the evacuation of Singapore. They had no children.

Cowgill died on 16 October 1959 in Harrogate, aged 71.

== Honours ==
During the First World War Cowgill was awarded the Military Cross (MC). In 1935, he was awarded the King George V Silver Jubilee Medal, and in 1937, the King George VI Coronation Medal. He was appointed Companion of the Order of St Michael and St George (CMG) in the 1946 New Year Honours.
