= Edward Lewis Brockman =

British colonial administrator in Malaysia (1865–1943)

Sir Edward Lewis Brockman KCMG CMG
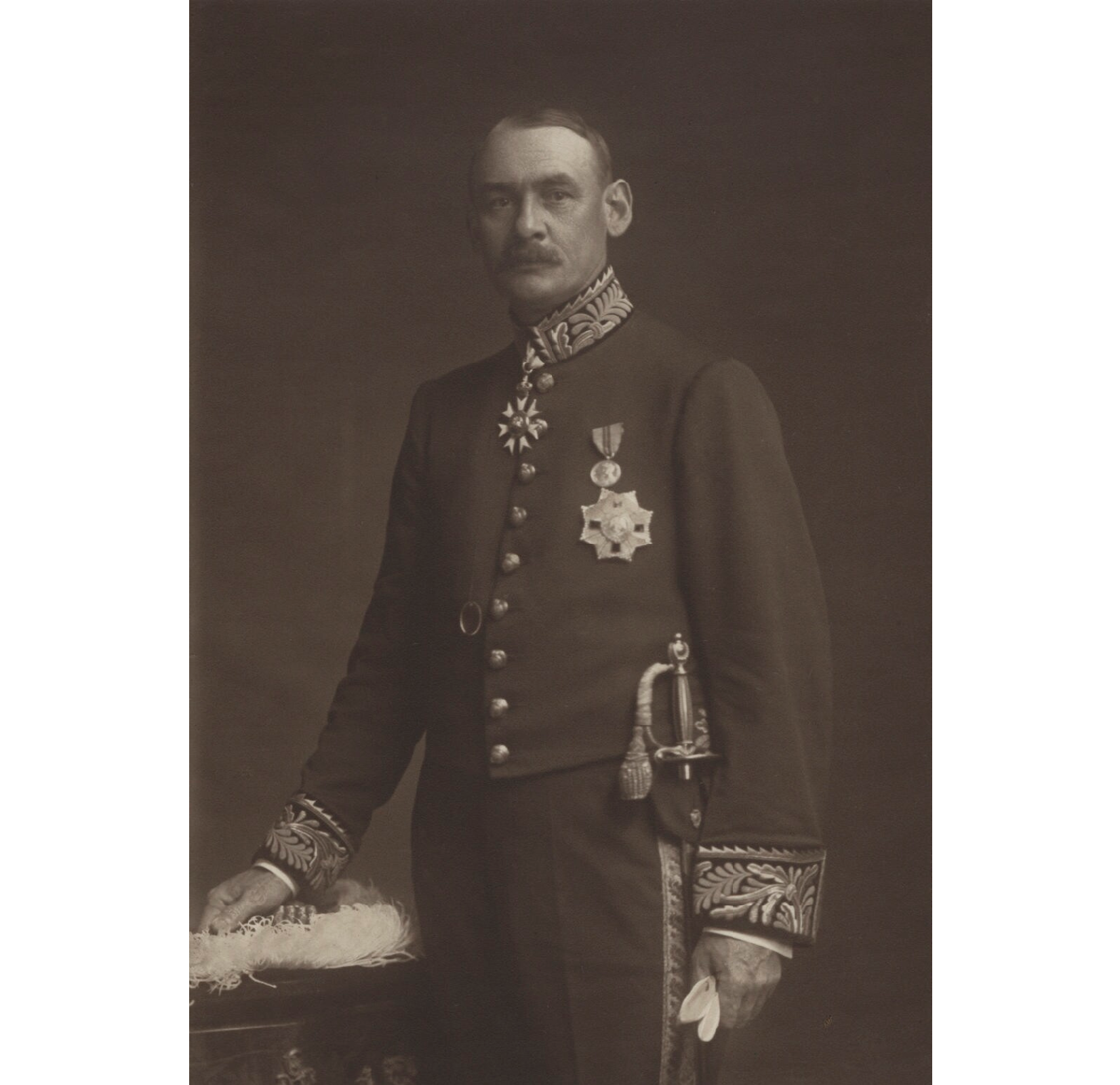
- Brockman in the 1910s

Chief Secretary, Federated Malay States
- In office 4 September 1911 – 1920
- Monarch: George V
- Preceded by: Sir Arthur Young as Resident-General of the FMS
- Succeeded by: William George Maxwell

11th Colonial Secretary of Straits Settlements
- In office 1 February 1911 – 4 September 1911
- Monarch: George V
- Governor: Sir John Anderson
- Preceded by: Sir Arthur Young
- Succeeded by: Richard James Wilkinson

Resident of Pahang
- In office November 1908 – 1910
- Monarch: Edward VII
- Governor: Sir John Anderson
- Preceded by: Cecil Wray; Harvey Chevallier (acting)
- Succeeded by: Warren Delabere Barnes

Acting Colonial Secretary of Straits Settlements
- In office 13 April 1905 – 29 June 1906
- Preceded by: Frederick George Penney
- Succeeded by: Captain Arthur Young

Personal details
- Born: 29 June 1865
- Died: 10 January 1943 (aged 77)
- Occupation: Colonial administrator

Sir Edward Lewis Brockman KCMG (29 June 1865 – 10 January 1943) was a colonial administrator who served briefly as the Colonial Secretary to the Straits Settlements in 1911 and was the chief secretary to the Federated Malay States (FMS) from 1911 to 1920. He announced the establishment of the Town Planning Committee to oversee Kuala Lumpur town planning service. He was descendant of the English Brockman family. Brockman Road (Jalan Dato' Onn) in Kuala Lumpur was named after him, where the former Prime Minister office was located.

== Career ==
Brockman started as a cadet of Straits Settlement Service in December 1886 and was appointed as private secretary to the John Frederick Dickson (Acting Governor of Straits Settlement) in October 1887.

In June 1889, he was appointed to be the Registrar of Deeds for the Settlement of Penang and on 1 June 1890 was appointed the Third Magistrate of Penang and continue as Acting Collector of Land Revenue, Penang.

In July 1891, he was appointed as District Officer of Bukit Mertajam and Coroner of Province Wellesley and in February 1892 was the acting 2nd Assistant Colonial Secretary to relieve Mr A H Capper who went on home sick leave.

On 22 March 1892, he was appointed as the District Officer of Penang and in November 1895 and June 1896, he was again appointed as acting 2nd Assistant Colonial Secretary.

In June 1896, he was appointed as Collector of Land Revenue, Singapore and in August 1897, Assistant Colonial Secretary and Clerk of Councils. On 24 August 1898, he was the Collector of Land Revenue, Malacca and in 1899 was the acting First Magistrate in Singapore.

In February 1902, he was appointed the Senior District Officer of Province Wellesley and in September 1902 commissioner of the Courts of Requests in Singapore while continuing to act as first magistrate in Singapore.

In September 1903, he was appointed as Assistant Colonial Secretary. and was the Acting Colonial Secretary of Straits Settlements between April 1905 and July 1906 when Mr F G Penney was on a furlough.

In April 1907, he was appointed Acting Federal Secretary (FMS) and confirmed the appointment in July 1907.

On 15 April 1908, he was the acting Resident of Perak and in November 1908 was appointed as the Resident of Pahang.

On 1 February 1911, he was appointed Colonial Secretary of Straits Settlements and on 4 September the same year, he arrived at Kuala Lumpur to take up the appointment of Chief Secretary, FMS.

From 1921 to 1925, Brockman was an agent of the Malay States Information Agency in London, succeeding Sir William Thomas Taylor who has retired from the position.

== Personal life ==
Brockman married widow Mrs F. S. B. Gaffney on 28 October 1907.

He retired in 1920, after 34 years of civil service in Malaya and Straits Settlements.

He continue to be active after retirement and was an agent of Malay States Information Agency, based in London.

== Honours ==
- United Kingdom :
  - Knight Commander of the Order of St Michael and St George (KCMG) – Sir (1913)
  - Companion of the Order of St Michael and St George (CMG) (1908)

== Notes ==
=== See also ===
FMS KL No 3663/1917 to Chung Thye Phin on Appointment to Federal Council

Government offices
Preceded by Sir Arthur Young as Resident-General of the FMS	Chief Secretary, Federated Malay States; 1911–1920	Succeeded by William George Maxwell
Preceded by Sir Arthur Young	Colonial Secretary of Straits Settlements; 1911	Succeeded by Richard James Wilkinson
Preceded by Cecil Wray; Harvey Chevallier (acting)	Resident of Pahang; 1908–1910	Succeeded by Warren Delabere Barnes
Preceded by Frederick George Penney	Acting Colonial Secretary of Straits Settlements; 1905–1906	Succeeded by Captain Arthur Young
