= Percy Alan Farrer Manby =

British colonial judge (1877-1940)

Percy Alan Farrer Manby (1877 – 6 May 1940) was a British barrister and Supreme Court judge in British Malaya and British Guiana.

== Early life and education ==
Percy Alan Farrer Manby was born in 1877, the only son of Sir Alan Manby. He was educated at Charterhouse School and Trinity Hall, Cambridge where he received his BA in 1898. In 1902, he was called to the bar of the Inner Temple.

== Career ==
After working as a barrister on the south-eastern circuit, in 1909, he went to Georgetown, British Guiana where he took up the appointment of stipendiary magistrate before later becoming puisne judge of the Supreme Court. In 1915, he transferred to Malaya as judge of the Supreme Court of the Straits Settlements and the Federated Malay States. In 1920, 1921, and 1923, he acted as Chief Judicial Commissioner of the Federated Malay States, and in 1925, 1926 and 1928, he acted as Chief Justice of the Federated Malay States. He retired in 1931.

== Personal life and death ==
In 1915, he married Lilian Leeder and they had a daughter.

He died on 6 May 1940 in Lymington, Hampshire at the age of 62. At the inquest, a verdict of suicide was returned.
