= Warren Delabere Barnes =

British colonial administrator (1865-1911)

- Born: 22 September 1865
- Died: 28 October 1911
- Other name: 班士
- Occupation: Colonial administrator

Warren Delabere Barnes (Chinese: 班士; pinyin: bān shì; Jyutping: baan1 si6; 22 September 1865 – 28 October 1911) was a British colonial administrator.

He was a member of the Malayan Civil Service from 1888 to 1910 and was Colonial Secretary of Hong Kong during five months in 1911, until his sudden death.

== Biography ==
Warren Barnes attended King's College School and Pembroke College, Cambridge, where he graduated in 1887.

=== Malay Peninsula ===
He was appointed to the Straits Settlements Civil Service as a Cadet by the Secretary of State in 1888, and was sent a year later to study the Teochew dialect in Shantou. He returned to Singapore in 1890 and passed his final examination in Teochew in November 1891.

He was then appointed 3rd Magistrate in Penang, 1893; acting Protector of Chinese in Perak later in the same year; Warden of Mines, senior magistrate, and Protector of Chinese in Pahang, January 1899; Assistant Protector of Chinese, Penang, 1901; acting Commissioner of Lands and Mines, Federated Malay States, August 1903; acting British Resident, Pahang, November 1903; acting Protector of Chinese Straits Settlements, 1904.

In May 1904, he was appointed Secretary for Chinese Affairs, Straits Settlements and Federated Malay States. In February 1909, he attended the International Opium Commission in Shanghai. In January 1910, he returned to Pahang as British Resident.

==== Elytranthe barnesii Gamble ====
In 1900, Barnes conducted an expedition to Gunung Benom in Pahang, with the main purpose of erecting a trigonometrical beacon on the mountain. Leaving Raub on 31 August, he reached a subsidiary summit of Gunung Benom, which he supposed to be Gunung Kluang Terbang. He was back at Raub on 21 September. During the expedition, he collected plants, of which 122 species collected at an altitude of 5,000 feet (1,525 m) were listed by Henry Nicholas Ridley. By 1913, Elytranthe barnesii Gamble of the family Loranthaceae, a plant that he had collected, had been named after him. The plant has been described as a parasite of Durio zibethinus (durian).

=== Hong Kong ===
Barnes was appointed Colonial Secretary of Hong Kong on 7 June 1911, taking up the office vacated on 21 January by Sir Francis Henry May, who had been appointed Governor of Fiji. Barnes became an ex officio member of the Legislative Council of Hong Kong on 8 June 1911. On 4 October 1911, he represented the British Government, together with J. W. Jamieson, HBM Consul-General at Canton, at the opening of the Chinese Section from Shenzhen to Guangzhou of the Kowloon–Canton Railway.

== Death ==
Barnes died on Saturday 28 October 1911, at age 46, of heart failure while playing polo in Happy Valley, Hong Kong. Arthur Winbolt Brewin, CMG, was appointed acting Colonial Secretary on 30 October 1911 and remained in this position until 28 November 1911. Cecil Clementi acted as Colonial Secretary from 22 January to 6 June and from 29 November 1911. Claud Severn of the Federated Malay States Service was appointed as the next Colonial Secretary and took office in 1912.

== Memberships ==
- He was elected a member of the Straits Branch of the Royal Asiatic Society in 1893
- He was elected a fellow of the Geological Society of London in 1902
- He was elected a fellow of the Royal Colonial Institute in 1911

== Works ==
Several of his papers were published in the Journal of the Straits Branch of the Royal Asiatic Society:

- Barnes, W. D. (June 1903). "Notes on a trip to Gunung Benom in Pahang". Journal of the Straits Branch of the Royal Asiatic Society. No. 39. Singapore. pp. 1–10. (The list of species by Henry Nicholas Ridley is at pp. 10–18)
- Schmidt, Wilhelm; Barnes, W. D. (June 1903). "Schmidt's Sakai and Semang Languages". Journal of the Straits Branch of the Royal Asiatic Society. No. 39. Singapore. pp. 38–45.
- Barnes, W. D. (December 1911). "Singapore Old Straits and New Harbour". Journal of the Straits Branch of the Royal Asiatic Society. No. 60. Singapore. pp. 25–34.
- Barnes, W. D. (December 1911). "An Old Royal Cemetery in Pekan in Pahang". Journal of the Straits Branch of the Royal Asiatic Society. No. 60. Singapore. pp. 35–36.
- Barnes, W. D. (December 1911). "An Old Tombstone in Pahang". Journal of the Straits Branch of the Royal Asiatic Society. No. 60. Singapore. pp. 37–40.

Government offices
Preceded by Sir Francis Henry May	Colonial Secretary of Hong Kong; 1911	Succeeded by Sir Claud Severn
