= Hancock Thomas Haughton =

Hancock Thomas Haughton (27 January 1851 – 9 July 1897), was a prominent civil servant in Singapore, Malacca and Penang.

== Biography ==
Haughton was born on 27 January 1851 in Dublin. He was appointed a cadet in November 1881 by the Secretary of State of the Straits Settlements, and arrived in January 1882. In March 1883, after passing an examination in Malay, he became an acting Magistrate of Malacca. He was also made a Justice of the Peace. In June, he was appointed Acting officer in charge of the Colonial Treasury of Malacca. He was appointed Acting Third Magistrate of Singapore in October. He became a Second Magistrate of Singapore in 1884. He became the acting Collector of Land Revenue of Malacca in November 1885. He was temporarily appointed a superintendent of the police in Malacca, a licensing officer, deputy registrar, and a coroner in March 1886. He was appointed a Visiting Justice of Singapore in January 1887. He was appointed Collector of Land Revenue of Singapore in either 1886 or 1887. In November 1889, he was appointed Second Magistrate and Commissioner of the Court of Requests of Singapore.

He became a Second Assistant Colonial Secretary on 2 August 1893. At the end of August, he was appointed Acting Assistant Colonial Secretary. In 1894, he was appointed the Acting First Magistrate of Penang. In June 1896, he was appointed Collector of Land Revenue and Officer in Charge of the Treasury in Malacca. He was appointed Acting Assistant Colonial Secretary on 3 May 1897. Soon after this, his health began to deteriorate, to the point where he could not attend a council meeting, and his place was taken by someone else.

== Personal life ==
Haughton underwent surgery on 6 July 1897 after the sudden deterioration of his health. The surgery appeared to be successful, but worse symptoms manifested on 8 July. He died on 9 July 1897 in the Singapore General Hospital due to liver abscess worsened by Influenza. His funeral was held the next day in Bukit Timah Cemetery.
