= John Robert Innes =

British judge and colonial administrator (1863-1948)

John Robert Innes CMG

Acting Chief Judicial Commissioner of the Federated Malay States
- In office 1917–1919
- Preceded by: Sir Thomas de Multon Lee Braddell
- Succeeded by: Sir G. Aubrey Goodman

Personal details
- Born: 4 September 1863
- Died: 1 October 1948 (aged 85)
- Education: University of Edinburgh
- Occupation: Barrister, colonial judge and colonial administrative service officer

John Robert Innes CMG (4 September 1863 – 1 October 1948) was a British barrister, colonial judge and administrative service officer in British Malaya.

== Early life and education ==
Innes was born on 4 September 1863, the son of James Innes of Banbury. He was educated at University of Edinburgh and University of Brussels and in 1900, was called to the Bar at Lincoln's Inn.

== Career ==
Innes joined the civil service of the Straits Settlements in 1886 after competitive examination, and served in various administrative and legal posts including, in succession: assistant Indian Immigration Agent, Malacca (1889); District Officer, North Malacca (1890); acting Collector of Land Revenue and Magistrate, Malacca (1892); District Officer, South Malacca (1893); acting Collector of Land Revenue and Officer in Charge of Treasury, also acting Magistrate and Deputy Registrar of Supreme Court, Malacca (1893); acting Collector of Land Revenue, Singapore (1894); acted as Magistrate (1894-95), and as Official Assignee and Registrar of Deeds (1895); acting assistant Colonial Secretary (1895); Collector of Land Revenue, Penang (1897); acting Senior District Officer, Province Wellesley (1898); acting 1st Magistrate, Penang, and acting Inspector of Prisons, Straits Settlements (1898–99).

In 1902, he was appointed Deputy Public Prosecutor, Straits Settlements and then Secretary to the Resident, Perak (1904); Acting Legal Adviser, Federated Malay States, and acted as Attorney General and Public Prosecutor, Straits Settlements (1906). In the following year, he was appointed Judicial Commissioner, Federated Malay States, and in 1915, was Judge of the Supreme Court, Straits Settlements. After serving as Acting Chief Judicial Commissioner in 1913, and again from 1917 to 1919, he retired in 1919.

== Personal life and death ==
Innes married Edith Offin. Their daughter Olive Mary married Sir Andrew Caldecott.

Innes died on 1 October 1948, aged 85.

== Honours ==
Innes was appointed Companion of the Order of St Michael and St George (CMG) in the 1920 New Year Honours.
