= Reginald George Watson =

Sir Reginald George Watson

11th British Resident of Perak
- In office 1913–1919
- Preceded by: William James Parke Hume
- Succeeded by: Sir William George Maxwell

Personal details
- Born: June 1862; Portland Place, Bath
- Died: 1926 (aged 63)
- Spouse: Sydney Francis Vivien Presgrave Margaret Niven

Sir Reginald George Watson CMG was born in June 1862, in Portland Place, Bath. He was the son of General E.D. Watson of Bengal Army. Watson married Sydney Francis Vivien Presgrave. He died in 1926.

== Education ==
Watson received his education at Haileybury College, Hertford, England and was the Straits Settlements Civil Service cadet in 1883, Private Secretary to Sir Cecil Clementi Smith, 1884- 1885; Officer of Land Office, Malacca (1887), British Resident of Perak (1913–1919).
