= Douglas Graham Campbell =

British colonial officer (1866–1918)

Douglas Graham Campbell CMG
- Portrait by Walter Stoneman, c. 1916
- Born: 1866
- Died: 1918 (aged 51–52)
- Occupation: Colonial administrator

Douglas Graham Campbell CMG (1866–1918) was a British colonial administrator who served in British Malaya for 35 years.

== Career ==
Campbell joined the civil service in 1883 as a second surveyor in the Public Works Department of the Selangor Government. In 1885 he transferred to the Land Office and then moved to Rawang town as Assistant District Officer. From 1888 to 1899 he served as District Officer in various locations: Kuala Langat in 1890; Ula Selangor in 1893; Klang in 1897; and Ula Selangor again in 1899. In 1901 he became Secretary to the Selangor Government, and then Resident of Negeri Sembilan in 1904 having filled the post of Acting Resident of several states on a number of occasions.

In 1910 he was appointed as General Adviser to the state of Johor. His predecessor, C. B. Buckley, whose official title was Honorary Financial Adviser to the Government of Johor, had been unpaid and non-resident. Sultan Ibrahim of Johor requested that his successor reside full-time in the state, but resisted British pressure to accept a Resident as in the other states. Campbell's title was therefore designated as General Advisor and he joined the Government as a seconded officer from the Federated And Protected Malay States enabling him to continue to draw his salary from the Civil List.

In 1917, in his final annual report on the condition of the state before his death the following year, he confirmed that the main feature of the year had been the state's "exceptional prosperity": "In the last five years the revenue has grown from four millions to over ten millions...While the expenditure has increased, it is only in moderate proportion. The state has three and a quarter million in investments, and no loan outstanding."

== Personal life and death ==
Campbell married twice, first to Ethel Mary Taylor, and secondly to Mary Abinda Spooner, daughter of C. E. Spooner. He had two daughters.

Campell died in 1918 while serving as British adviser to Johor.

== Honours and memorials ==
Campbell was appointed a CMG in 1912. A memorial brass plate was placed in St. Mary's Cathedral, Kuala Lumpur. Campbell Road (now Jalan Dang Wangi) in Kuala Lumpur was named after him.
