= Henry Conway Belfield =

English colonial administrator (1855–1923)

Sir Henry Conway Belfield KCMG JP
- Born: 29 November 1855
- Died: 8 January 1923 (aged 67)
- Occupation: Colonial administrator

Sir Henry Conway Belfield, KCMG, JP (29 November 1855 – 8 January 1923) was an English colonial administrator.

== Biography ==
The son of John Belfield, JP, of Primley Hill, South Devon, and of Eliza Conway Bridges, daughter of Captain George Bridges, RN, Belfield was educated at Rugby School in Warwickshire and Oriel College, Oxford. He was called to the bar by the Inner Temple in 1880 and joined the Western circuit.

In 1884 he joined the Selangor Civil Service as a magistrate, becoming Chief Magistrate of Selangor in 1888 and Senior Magistrate of Perak in 1892. On the federation of the Malay States in 1896 he became First Commissioner of Lands and Mines, and acted as British Resident of Selangor on several occasions. Belfield was British Resident of Negri Sembilan in 1901, British Resident of Selangor from 1902 to 1912, acting British Resident of Perak in 1904, acting Resident-General of the Federated Malay States in May 1908, and British Resident of Perak in 1911. In 1912 he was sent to the Gold Coast and Ashanti to report on legislation concerning the alienation of native lands.

Belfield was appointed Governor of the East Africa Protectorate (now Kenya) in 1912, and concurrently High Commissioner of Zanzibar in 1914. He served as Governor until 1917. His tenure was marked by his championing of European settlers' interests over those of the native population, notably through the Crown Lands Ordinance of 1915, which deprived natives of their land rights. His perceived lack of interest in the East African Campaign led to discontent, and after two unsuccessful attempts he was forced into retirement by the Colonial Office. He retired to England, where he was a justice of the peace for Devon. Belfield was appointed a CMG in 1909 and promoted KCMG in 1914.

In 1884 Belfield married Florence Rathborne, daughter of the Rev James Rathborne; they had one son and two daughters.

== Works ==
- Report Upon the Present Condition of Affairs in Labuan and Brunei (1905)
- Handbook of the Federated Malay States (1906)
- Gold Coast. Report Legislation Governing Alienation Native Lands Gold Coast Colony Ashanti (1912)
