= Ernest Woodford Birch =

British colonial administrator

Sir Ernest Woodford Birch KCMG
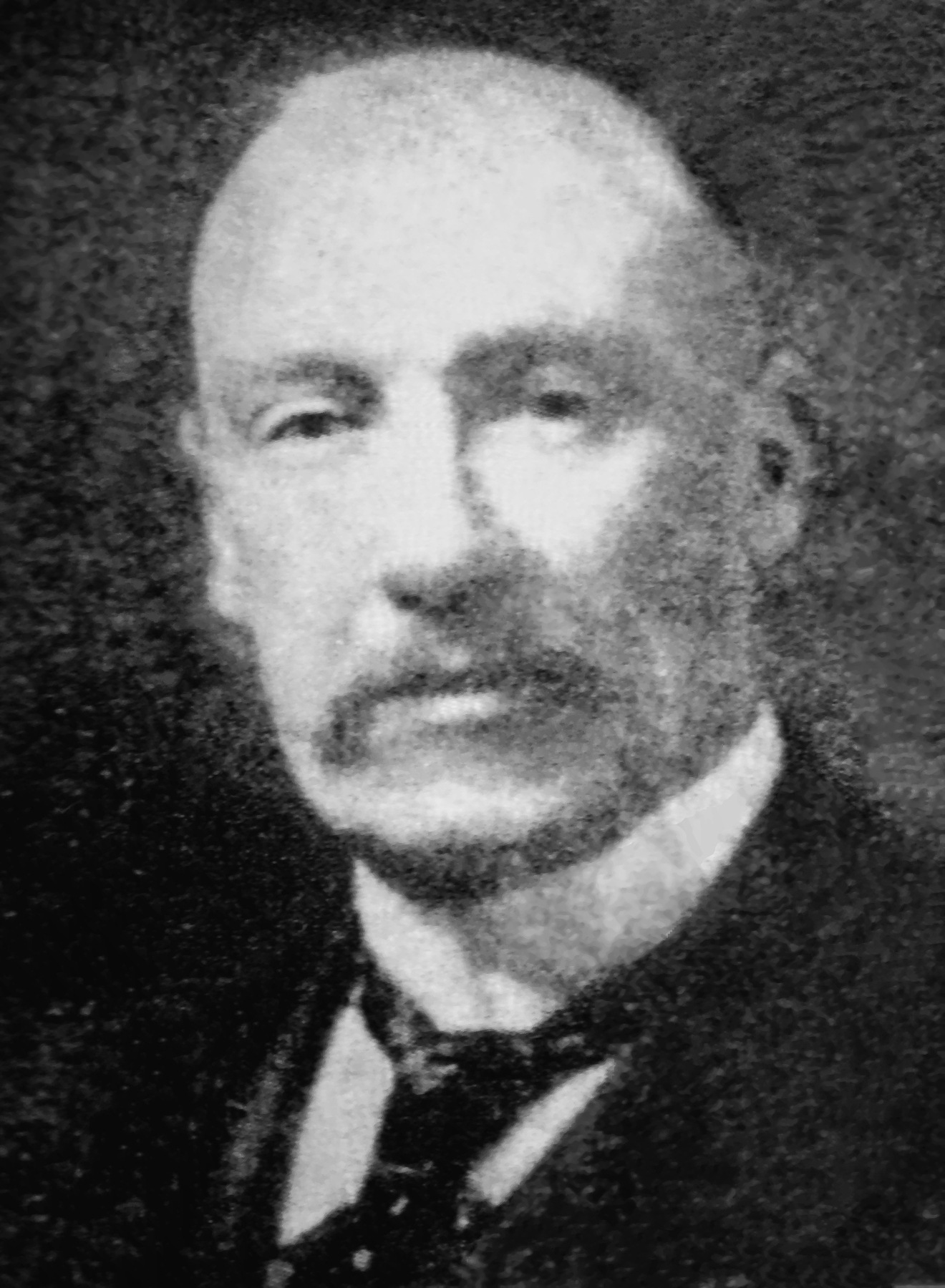

8th British Resident of Perak
- In office 1904–1910
- Preceded by: Sir John Pickersgill Rodger
- Succeeded by: Henry Conway Belfield

Governor of North Borneo
- In office 1901–1903
- Monarch: Edward VII
- Preceded by: Hugh Charles Clifford
- Succeeded by: Edward Peregrine Gueritz

Personal details
- Born: 29 April 1857 Trincomalee, British Ceylon (present-day Sri Lanka)
- Died: 17 December 1929 (aged 72) Bexhill-on-Sea, East Sussex, Sussex, England
- Spouse: Margaret Niven

Sir Ernest Woodford Birch, KCMG (29 April 1857 – 17 December 1929) was a British colonial administrator who served as the eighth British resident of Perak (1904–1911).

== Family ==
Sir Ernest was the eldest son of James Wheeler Woodford Birch. Although born in Trincomalee, Ceylon on 29 April 1857, he was sent to England at the age of 10 to stay with his grandfather, Rev. James Woodford Birch, Vicar of the All Saints, Hertford. In 1882, he married Margaret, the eldest daughter of Lawrence Niven, then Director of the Singapore Botanical Gardens. Sir Ernest and Lady Margaret had two sons and four daughters. In 1890 their eldest son drowned at Tanjung Kling, Malacca, aged only seven years old. His other son, Patrick, followed his father's footstep and served in the Indian Civil Service.

== Education ==
Ernest Woodford Birch was educated at Hertford Grammar School, Sidney College, Bath, Elstree School and Harrow until 1874. He then went to Oxford and read with a private tutor for twelve months before attending university and afterward served the Indian Civil Service. His studies were interrupted when his father was murdered in Pasir Salak. In January 1876, he was graciously permitted by Her Majesty's Government to enter the Colonial Office at Downing Street and worked until 1878, when he was appointed as cadet in the Straits Settlements Civil Service.

== Career ==
Upon his arrival in Singapore, he was given a position in the Secretariat under Sir Cecil Clementi Smith who has been a staunch friend to Sir Ernest. Sir Ernest previous experience in the Colonial Office enabled him to be of special assistance of all important Commission on the Police Force held about 1880.

In 1881, he was in charge of the Land Office at Malacca for a few months and in July 1881, he held the same position at Singapore. In May 1882, he was posted as the Acting Second Assistant Colonial Secretary. In 1885, he made his first official visit to Cocos Islands and upon his return from furlough in 1887, he was confirmed to appoint as the Second Assistant Colonial Secretary and appointed a Commission to inquire regarding the attempted murder of W.A. Pickering, the Protector of Chinese.

In January 1888, Sir Ernest was transferred to Malacca in the dual capacity of Magistrate and Collector of Land Revenue to carry out the land policy by Sir William Maxwell. He was also the District Officer at Alor Gajah and Jasin, in spite of many opposition, he succeeded, by means of acquiring an intimate knowledge of the people, in establishing new system, and the revenue was greatly enhanced during his four years' stay in the territory. Maybe it was his success, in 1890 he was requested by Sir William Maxwell to investigate the land system in Selangor, and he made two reports upon it.

For eight months in 1892, he acted as the Acting British Resident of Selangor and in January 1893, he was appointed as the Secretary to the Government of Perak. He was instrumental in introducing a new land survey system into Perak and in urging forward the Kerian irrigation scheme. In May 1894, Sir Ernest was granted furlough leave and returned to duty in August 1895. On the departure of Sir Frank Swettenham on leave, Sir Ernest was appointed as the Acting British Resident of Perak.

During his office as the Acting British Resident of Perak, he called the first meeting of the State Council, over which he presided, for 2 November 1895 the twentieth anniversary of his father's murder. He reminded the Sultan and the chiefs assembled of the day and of the event. In June of the following year, he reverted to his substantive appointment as the Secretary to the Government, and in February 1897, he went to Negeri Sembilan to appoint as Acting British Resident in succession to Martin Lister and, upon Lister's death, he was confirmed the appointment and filled the office until May 1900. He arranged the agreement, by which the Yang di-Pertuan of Sri Menanti, who had long been estranged from other chiefs, was recognised by them as the constitutional head of Negeri Sembilan. During his short administration, Negeri Sembilan's revenue grew from $552,000 to $1,085,000 and a new land and survey system was introduced and public service was greatly improved.

In recognition of his valued services, in 1900 he was knighted by Queen Victoria at Windsor with the CMG. He became the principal representative of the British North Borneo Company and posted as the governor in 1901. During his two years and eight months served in North Borneo. He worked arduously for the welfare of the country. He travelled over the whole territory in North Borneo, and introduced numerous settlers, built a new town at Jesselton and converted the country from lawlessness to peace. In December 1904, Sir Ernest returned to England, and in February 1904, he was appointed as the British Resident of Perak. During his administration in Perak, he had successfully reorganised the administration in Perak, and established various clubs and introduced many sports to the state. He also served as Chairman of the Eastern Smelting Company Limited, founded by Chung Thye Phin, Eu Tong Seng and others. He died 17 December 1929 in Bexhill-on-Sea, East Sussex.

== Sources ==
- Wright, Arnold, Twentieth Century Impressions of British Malaya: Its history, people, commerce, industries and resources, 1908

Government offices
Preceded by Hugh C. Clifford	Governor of North Borneo; 1901–1903	Succeeded by Edward P. Gueritz
