= 1937 in British Malaya =

- Decades: 1930s; 1940s; 1950s
- See also: Other events of 1937; History of Malaysia • Timeline • Years

This article lists important figures and events in the public affairs of British Malaya during the year 1937, together with births and deaths of prominent Malayans.

== Incumbent political figures ==
=== Central level ===
- Governor of Federated of Malay States :
  - Shenton Whitelegge Thomas
- Federal Secretary of the Federated of Malay States :
  - Christopher Dominic Ahearne
- Governor of Straits Settlements :
  - Shenton Whitelegge Thomas

=== State level ===
- Perlis :
  - Raja of Perlis : Syed Alwi Syed Saffi Jamalullail
- Johore :
  - Sultan of Johor : Sultan Ibrahim Al-Masyhur
- Kedah :
  - Sultan of Kedah : Abdul Hamid Halim Shah
- Kelantan :
  - Sultan of Kelantan : Sultan Ismail Sultan Muhammad IV
- (Terengganu) Trengganu :
  - Sultan of Trengganu : Sulaiman Badrul Alam Shah
- Selangor :
  - British Residents of Selangor :
    - Theodore Samuel Adams (until unknown date)
    - Stanley Wilson Jones (from unknown date)
  - Sultan of Selangor :
    - Sultan Sir Alaeddin Sulaiman Shah (until unknown date)
    - Sultan Sir Hishamuddin Alam Shah Al-Haj (from unknown date)
- Penang :
  - Monarchs : King George VI
  - Residents-Councillors : Arthur Mitchell Goodman
- Malacca :
  - Monarchs : King George VI
  - Residents-Councillors :
- (Negeri Sembilan) Negri Sembilan :
  - British Residents of Negri Sembilan :
    - John Whitehouse Ward Hughes (until unknown date)
    - Gordon Lupton Ham (from unknown date)
  - Yang di-Pertuan Besar of Negri Sembilan : Tuanku Abdul Rahman ibni Almarhum Tuanku Muhammad
- Pahang :
  - British Residents of Pahang : C. C. Brown
  - Sultan of Pahang : Sultan Abu Bakar
- Perak :
  - British Residents of Perak : G. E. Cater
  - Sultan of Perak : Sultan Iskandar Shah

== Events ==
- 1 April – Ma'ahad Muhammadi Lelaki established.
- Unknown date – Construction of Central Market, Kuala Lumpur completed.

== Births ==
- 13 March – Fadzil Mohd Noor – Politician (died 2002)
- 28 March – Khoo Kay Kim – Historian
- 13 April – Tengku Razaleigh Hamzah – Politician
- 5 May – Hussein Abu Hassan – Actor (died 2007)
- 23 June – Kamaruzzaman bin Abdul Kadir – Writer (died 2005)
- 4 July – Abdullah Ahmad – Journalist
- 14 September – Abu Zahar bin Haji Isnin – Politician (died 2013)
- 30 October – Asaari Muhammad – Founder Al-Arqam (died 2010)
- 1 December – Mohd Zin Abdul Ghani – Politician (died 1997)
- 29 December – Mohd Khalil Yaakob – Politician
- Unknown date – Fadzil Mahmood – Politician
- Unknown date – Karim Latiff – Actor (died 2015)
