= 1935 in British Malaya =

- Decades: 1930s; 1940s; 1950s
- See also: Other events of 1935; History of Malaysia • Timeline • Years

This article lists important figures and events in the public affairs of British Malaya during the year 1935, together with births and deaths of prominent Malayans.

== Incumbent political figures ==
=== Central level ===
- Governor of Federated of Malay States :
  - Shenton Whitelegge Thomas
- Chief Secretaries to the Government of the FMS :
  - Malcolm Bond Shelley (until unknown date)
  - Marcus Rex (from unknown date)
- Governor of Straits Settlements :
  - Shenton Whitelegge Thomas

=== State level ===
- Perlis :
  - Raja of Perlis : Syed Alwi Syed Saffi Jamalullail
- Johore :
  - Sultan of Johor : Sultan Ibrahim Al-Masyhur
- Kedah :
  - Sultan of Kedah : Abdul Hamid Halim Shah
- Kelantan :
  - Sultan of Kelantan : Sultan Ismail Sultan Muhammad IV
- (Terengganu) Trengganu :
  - Sultan of Trengganu : Sulaiman Badrul Alam Shah
- Selangor :
  - British Residents of Selangor :
    - George Ernest London (until unknown date)
    - Theodore Samuel Adams (from unknown date)
  - Sultan of Selangor : Sultan Sir Alaeddin Sulaiman Shah
- Penang :
  - Monarchs : King George V
  - Residents-Councillors : Arthur Mitchell Goodman
- Malacca :
  - Monarchs : King George V
  - Residents-Councillors :
- (Negeri Sembilan) Negri Sembilan :
  - British Residents of Negri Sembilan : John Whitehouse Ward Hughes
  - Yang di-Pertuan Besar of Negri Sembilan : Tuanku Abdul Rahman ibni Almarhum Tuanku Muhammad
- Pahang :
  - British Residents of Pahang :
    - Hugh Goodwin Russell Leonard (until unknown date)
    - C. C. Brown (from unknown date)
  - Sultan of Pahang : Sultan Abu Bakar
- Perak :
  - British Residents of Perak : G. E. Cater
  - Sultan of Perak : Sultan Iskandar Shah

== Events ==
- 14 January – Convent Datuk Keramat was founded by Rev. Mother Tarcisius.
- Unknown date – Catholic High School, Singapore was founded by the Rev. Father Edward Becheras.
- Unknown date – The Criminal Procedure Code (Malaysia) was enacted.

== Births ==
- 1 January – Mustapha Maarof – Malaysian actor (died 2014)
- 22 January – Saloma – Singaporean-Malaysian singer, film actress, trendsetter and fashion icon (died 1983)
- 24 March – Lee San Choon - Malaysian politician and businessman (died 2023)
- 9 April – A. Samad Said – Malaysian National Laureate
- 28 May – Azizan Zainul Abidin - businessman (died 2004)
- 20 September – Wong Phui Nam - Malaysian economist and poet (died 2022)
- 1 October – Peter Velappan - Malaysian football administrator and manager (died 2018)
- 4 October – Law Hieng Ding - politician (died 2018)
- 5 November – Jins Shamsuddin – film actor, director and politician (died 2017)

== Deaths ==
- 12 January – Cheah Tek Thye, businessman, banker and lawmaker (b. 1890).
- 29 March – Chung Thye Phin, last Kapitan Cina of Perak and Malaya (b. 1879).
