= 1938 in British Malaya =

- Decades: 1930s; 1940s; 1950s
- See also: Other events of 1938; History of Malaysia • Timeline • Years

This article lists important figures and events in the public affairs of British Malaya during the year 1938, together with births and deaths of prominent Malayans.

== Incumbent political figures ==
=== Central level ===
- Governor of Federated of Malay States :
  - Shenton Whitelegge Thomas
- Federal Secretaries of the Federated of Malay States :
  - Christopher Dominic Ahearne
- Governor of Straits Settlements :
  - Shenton Whitelegge Thomas

=== State level ===
- Perlis :
  - Raja of Perlis : Syed Alwi Syed Saffi Jamalullail
- Johore :
  - Sultan of Johor : Sultan Ibrahim Al-Masyhur
- Kedah :
  - Sultan of Kedah : Abdul Hamid Halim Shah
- Kelantan :
  - Sultan of Kelantan : Sultan Ismail Sultan Muhammad IV
- (Terengganu) Trengganu :
  - Sultan of Trengganu : Sulaiman Badrul Alam Shah
- Selangor :
  - British Residents of Selangor : Stanley Wilson Jones
  - Sultan of Selangor : Sultan Sir Hishamuddin Alam Shah Al-Haj
- Penang :
  - Monarchs : King George VI
  - Residents-Councillors : Arthur Mitchell Goodman
- Malacca :
  - Monarchs : King George VI
  - Residents-Councillors :
- (Negeri Sembilan) Negri Sembilan :
  - British Residents of Negri Sembilan : Gordon Lupton Ham
  - Yang di-Pertuan Besar of Negri Sembilan : Tuanku Abdul Rahman ibni Almarhum Tuanku Muhammad
- Pahang :
  - British Residents of Pahang : C. C. Brown
  - Sultan of Pahang : Sultan Abu Bakar
- Perak :
  - British Residents of Perak : G. E. Cater
  - Sultan of Perak :
    - Sultan Iskandar Shah (until unknown date)
    - Sultan Abdul Aziz Al-Mutasim Billah Shah (from unknown date)

== Events ==
- Unknown date – Kesatuan Melayu Muda was established (dissolved in 1945).

== Births ==
- 4 January – Mohamed Rahmat – Politician (died 2010)
- 1 April – Ananda Krishnan – Businessman and billionaire
- 4 April – Naaman bin Haji Mohd Rawi – Poet
- 15 April – Abdul Rahman Abbas – Politician
- 29 April – Daim Zainuddin, Politician and Businessman (died 2024)
- 1 May - Hamid Bin Mohamed Isa (died 2020)
- 3 June – Ooi Eow Jin – Composer
- 10 June – Abdul Aziz Shamsuddin – Politician (died 2020)
- 10 July – M. Daud Kilau – Singer
- 26 August – Dayang Sofia – Actress
- 8 September – Kuswadinata – Actor (died 2013)
- 19 September – Kassim Masdor – Composer (died 2014)
- 11 November – Abdul Rahman bin Abdul Hamid – 9th Chief Commander of Malaysian Armed Forces
- 6 December – Murphy Nicholas Xavier Pakiam – Chief Bishop of Roman Catholic Archdiocese of Kuala Lumpur

== Deaths ==
- 31 March – Sulaiman of Selangor, 5th Sultan of Selangor (b. 1863).
- 22 August – Chee Swee Cheng, businessman and banker (b. 1866).
- 14 October – Iskandar of Perak, 30th Sultan of Perak (b. 1876).
