= 1936 in British Malaya =

- Decades: 1930s; 1940s; 1950s
- See also: Other events of 1936; History of Malaysia • Timeline • Years

This article lists important figures and events in the public affairs of British Malaya during the year 1936, together with births and deaths of prominent Malayans.

== Incumbent political figures ==
=== Central level ===
- Governor of Federated of Malay States :
  - Shenton Whitelegge Thomas
- Chief Secretaries to the Government of the FMS :
  - Marcus Rex (until unknown date)
- Federal Secretaries of the Federated of Malay States :
  - Christopher Dominic Ahearne (from unknown date)
- Governor of Straits Settlements :
  - Shenton Whitelegge Thomas

=== State level ===
- Perlis :
  - Raja of Perlis : Syed Alwi Syed Saffi Jamalullail
- Johore :
  - Sultan of Johor : Sultan Ibrahim Al-Masyhur
- Kedah :
  - Sultan of Kedah : Abdul Hamid Halim Shah
- Kelantan :
  - Sultan of Kelantan : Sultan Ismail Sultan Muhammad IV
- (Terengganu) Trengganu :
  - Sultan of Trengganu : Sulaiman Badrul Alam Shah
- Selangor :
  - British Residents of Selangor : Theodore Samuel Adams
  - Sultan of Selangor : Sultan Sir Alaeddin Sulaiman Shah
- Penang :
  - Monarchs :
    - King George V (until 20 January)
    - King Edward VIII (20 January – 11 December)
    - King George VI (from 11 December)
  - Residents-Councillors : Arthur Mitchell Goodman
- Malacca :
  - Monarchs :
    - King George V (until 20 January)
    - King Edward VIII (20 January – 11 December)
    - King George VI (from 11 December)
  - Residents-Councillors :
- (Negeri Sembilan) Negri Sembilan :
  - British Residents of Negri Sembilan : John Whitehouse Ward Hughes
  - Yang di-Pertuan Besar of Negri Sembilan : Tuanku Abdul Rahman ibni Almarhum Tuanku Muhammad
- Pahang :
  - British Residents of Pahang : C. C. Brown
  - Sultan of Pahang : Sultan Abu Bakar
- Perak :
  - British Residents of Perak : G. E. Cater
  - Sultan of Perak : Sultan Iskandar Shah

== Events ==
- 18 February – Football Association of Selangor established.
- 22 February – Selangor FA was founded.
- Unknown date – The enactment of Penal Code.

== Births ==
- 19 January – Sidek Abdullah Kamar, Badminton player (died 2005)
- 21 May – Abdul Taib Mahmud, 4th Chief Minister of Sarawak (1981–2014) (died 2024)
- 10 August – Saadiah – Actress (died 2005)
- 16 November – Elyas Omar, politician (died 2018)
