= 1939 in British Malaya =

- Decades: 1930s; 1940s; 1950s
- See also: Other events of 1939; History of Malaysia • Timeline • Years

This article lists important figures and events in the public affairs of British Malaya during the year 1939, together with births and deaths of prominent Malayans.

== Incumbent political figures ==
=== Central level ===
- Monarch : King George VI
- Governor of the Straits Settlements and High Commissioner to the Malay States:
  - Shenton Whitelegge Thomas
- Secretary of the Federated of Malay States:
  - Christopher Dominic Ahearne (until unknown date)
  - Hugh Fraser (until unknown date)

=== State level ===
==== Straits Settlements ====
- Penang :
  - Residents-Councillors : Arthur Mitchell Goodman
- Malacca :
  - Residents-Councillors :

==== Federated Malay States ====
- (Federated Malay States) Selangor :
  - British Resident of Selangor :
    - Stanley Wilson Jones (until unknown date)
    - G. M. Kidd (from unknown date)
  - Sultan of Selangor : Sultan Sir Hishamuddin Alam Shah Al-Haj
- (Federated Malay States) (Negeri Sembilan) Negri Sembilan :
  - British Resident of Negri Sembilan :
    - Gordon Lupton Ham (until unknown date)
    - John Vincent Cowgill (from unknown date)
  - Yang di-Pertuan Besar of Negri Sembilan : Tuanku Abdul Rahman ibni Almarhum Tuanku Muhammad
- (Federated Malay States) Pahang :
  - British Resident of Pahang : C. C. Brown
  - Sultan of Pahang : Sultan Abu Bakar
- (Federated Malay States) Perak :
  - British Resident of Perak :
    - G. E. Cater (until unknown date)
    - Marcus Rex (from unknown date)
  - Sultan of Perak : Sultan Abdul Aziz Al-Mutasim Billah Shah Ibni Almarhum Raja Muda Musa I

==== Other states ====
- Perlis :
  - Raja of Perlis : Syed Alwi Syed Saffi Jamalullail
- Johore :
  - Sultan of Johor : Sultan Ibrahim Al-Masyhur
- Kedah :
  - Sultan of Kedah : Abdul Hamid Halim Shah
- Kelantan :
  - Sultan of Kelantan : Sultan Ismail Sultan Muhammad IV
- (Terengganu) Trengganu :
  - Sultan of Trengganu : Sulaiman Badrul Alam Shah

== Events ==
- 13 January – Chung Cheng High School was founded.
- 15 January – Establishment of Kluang High School.
- Unknown date – SJK(T) Bandar Mentakab was founded.
- Unknown date – The Malayan Dollar was introduced, replacing the Straits Dollar.
- Unknown date – Construction completed on Istana Bukit Serene, Johor.

== Births ==
- 16 January – Mohammed Hanif Omar – 4th Inspector-General of Police (1974-1994)
- 26 March – Latifah Omar – actress (died 2013)
- 8 April – Lim Keng Yaik - Politician (died 2012)
- 14 April – Razali Ismail – Diplomat
- 3 June – Lee Shin Cheng, Malaysian business magnate, investor and philanthropist (died 2019)
- 4 June – Abdul Kadir Sheikh Fadzir – Politician
- 26 June – Zainuddin Maidin, Malaysian politician (died 2018)
- July – Azman Hashim – Chairman of Arab-Malaysian Bank (AmBank)
- 3 July – Rahim Razali – actor, director, producer, and sports commentator
- 21 July – Abdul Hamid Othman – Politician (died 2011)
- 23 August – Rejabhad – Cartoonist
- 10 October – Zainal Abidin Ahmad - Politician (died 2010)
- 5 November – Ismail bin Abbas – Novelist
- 13 November – S. Othman Kelantan – National Laureate (died 2008)
- 26 November – Abdullah Ahmad Badawi – Politician and former 6th Prime Minister of Malaysia
- 17 December – Nik Safiah Karim – Lecturer and grammarian
- Unknown date – Othman Hafsham – Film director
- Unknown date – Redza Piyadasa – actor, art critic and art historian (died 2007)
