= Raja Alang Mosque =

Historical mosque in Beranang, Malaysia

- Masjid Raja Alang
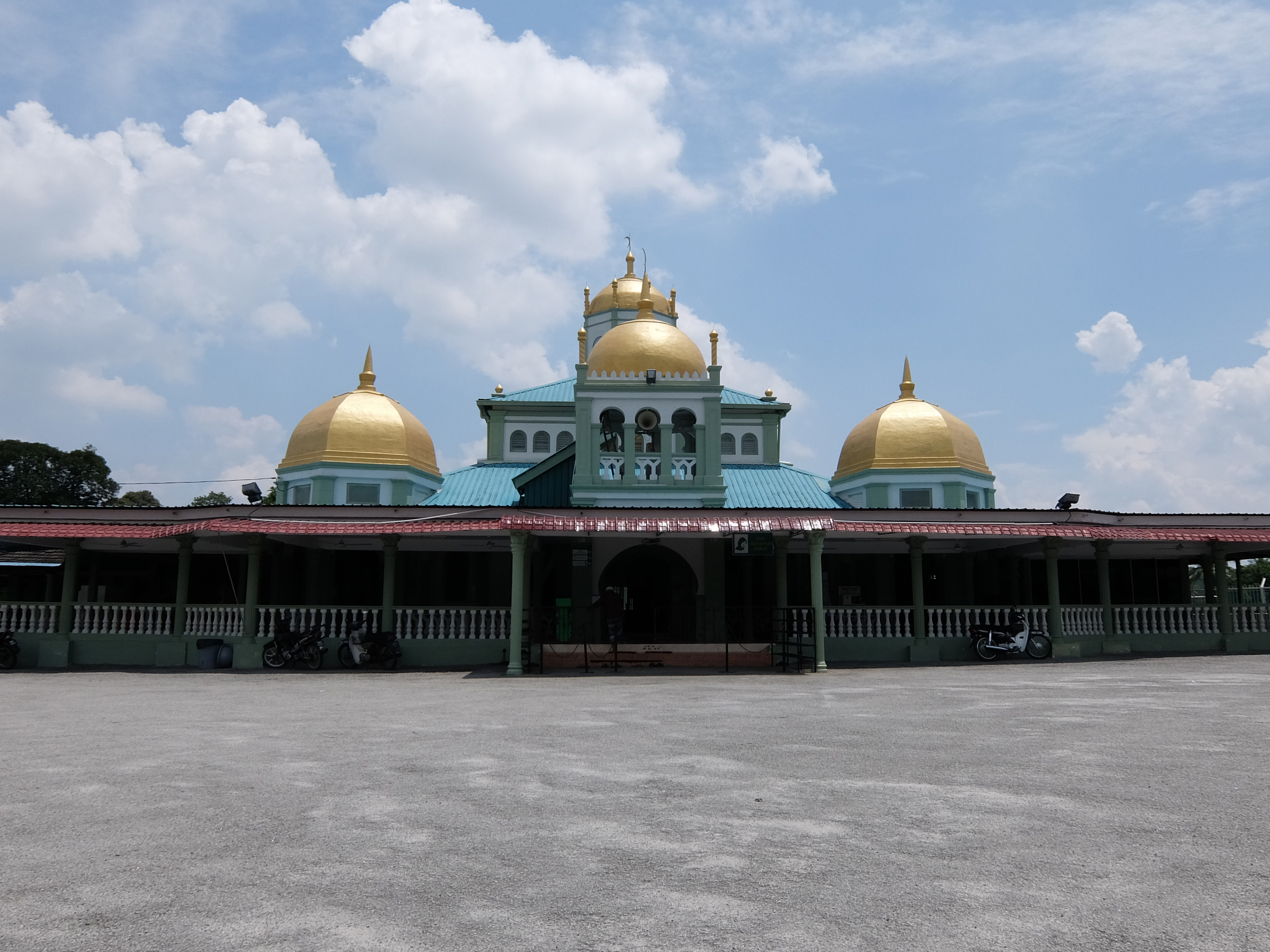

- Location within Selangor

Religion
- Affiliation: Islam

Location
- Location: Beranang, Selangor, Malaysia
- Interactive map of Raja Alang Mosque
- Coordinates: 2.8740°N 101.8706°E

Architecture
- Type: Mosque

The Raja Alang Mosque (Malay: Masjid Raja Alang) is a historical mosque in Beranang, Sepang District, Selangor, Malaysia. It was named after Raja Alang, who was the son of Tengku Panglima Besar Selangor, Raja Berayun Raja Ibrahim, who ruled Kajang during Almarhum Sultan Sir Abdul Samad's reign. He was from Sumatra, Indonesia.

== History ==
Raja Alang Mosque was constructed between 1904 and 1906. The mosque was officially opened in 1907 by Almarhum Sultan Sir Alaeddin Sulaiman Shah of Selangor.

== Features ==
The mosque is similar to Alaeddin Mosque in Jugra. Its style is Middle Eastern with Moorish and Western influences.

== See also ==
- Islam in Malaysia
