= Hugh Fraser (colonial administrator) =

British Colonial Administrator of Straits Settlements

Acting Colonial Secretary of Straits Settlements
- In office 27 January 1942 – 15 February 1942
- Monarch: George VI
- Governor: Sir Shenton Thomas
- Preceded by: Stanley Wilson Jones
- Succeeded by: Post abolished

Federal Secretary of the Federated Malay States (FMS)
- In office 1939 – January 1942
- Monarch: George VI
- High Commissioner of FMS: Sir Shenton Thomas
- Preceded by: Christopher Dominic Ahearne
- Succeeded by: Post abolished

Personal details
- Born: 1891
- Died: 1944 (aged 52–53)
- Profession: Colonial Administrator

Hugh Fraser (1891–1944), was a British colonial administrator. He was the last acting Colonial Secretary of Straits Settlements before the fall of Singapore on 15 February 1942 to the Japanese Occupation and was interned in Changi Prison. He subsequently died in Outram Road Prison in 1944.

== Education ==
Fraser was educated in Wellington College and Exeter College, Oxford.

== Career ==
In 1917, Fraser was the Third Assistant Secretary at Federal Secretariat and Private Secretary to Chief Secretary of Federated Malay States (FMS). After several terms of office as District Officer, he went on to Kedah as Acting Assistant Adviser and Acting Legal Adviser.

In June 1927, Fraser was the Assistant Treasurer FMS and State Treasurer (Selangor). He was later appointed to the Malayan Establishment Office and 1936 as Secretary to High Commissioner of Malaya.

In 1937, Fraser was the Acting Under-Secretary of FMS and April 1937 Acting Federal Secretary FMS when Mr Christopher Dominic Ahearne was away. In December 1937, Fraser was appointed as Under-Secretary of FMS.

On 27 January 1942, Fraser took over as Acting Colonial Secretary of Straits Settlements from Sir S W Jones before the fall of Singapore to the Japanese Occupation and was subsequently interned.

== Interned and death ==
Fraser was interned at Changi Prison during Japanese Occupation of Singapore. On 10 October 1943, after the Operation Jaywick incident, he was arrested along with others when the kempeitai raided the internment camp. He died as a result of torture and mistreatment by the Kempeitai at Outram Road Prison on 24 July 1944.

Government offices
Preceded by Stanley Wilson Jones	Acting Colonial Secretary of Straits Settlements; 1942	Post abolished
Preceded by Christopher Dominic Ahearne	Federal Secretary of the Federated Malay States; 1939 – 1942	Post abolished
