= Musa Ghiatuddin Riayat Shah of Selangor =

Sultan of Selangor (r. 1942–1945)

Musa Ghiatuddin Riayat Shah موسى غياث الدين رعايت شاه
- Sultan of Selangor
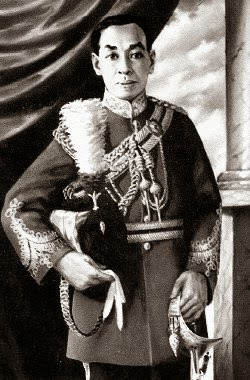

Sultan of Selangor
- Reign: 15 January 1942 – 14 September 1945
- Predecessor: Hisamuddin of Selangor
- Successor: Hisamuddin of Selangor
- Born: 9 December 1893; Istana Bandar Temasha, Kampung Bandar, Kuala Langat, Selangor, Federated Malay States, British Malaya
- Died: 8 November 1955 (aged 61); Kuala Lumpur
- Burial: Royal Mausoleum, Klang, Selangor, Malaya
- Spouse: Tunku Sharifah Mastura binti Syed Ahmad Shahabuddin Tengku Permaisuri of Selangor Y.A.M Tengku Jeriah binti Tengku Ariffin Cik Puan Anjang binti Abdullah
Names
- Tengku Musa Eddin Shah ibni Sultan Alauddin Sulaiman Shah
Regnal name
- Sultan Musa Ghiatuddin Riayat Shah ibni Al-Marhum Sultan Alauddin Sulaiman Shah
- House: Opu Daeng Chelak
- Father: Sultan Alauddin Sulaiman Shah ibni Al-Marhum Raja Muda Raja Musa
- Mother: Tunku Maharum binti Al-Marhum Tunku Ziauddin Al-Haj
- Religion: Sunni Islam

Musa Ghiatuddin Riayat Shah Ibni Al-Marhum Sultan Alauddin Sulaiman Shah (born Tengku Musa Eddin; Jawi: سلطان موسى غياث الدين رعايت شاه ابن المرحوم سلطان علاء الدين سليمان شاه; 9 December 1893 – 8 November 1955) was Sultan of Selangor in Malaysia during the Japanese occupation of Selangor (1942–1945). He received the Order of the Rising Sun from the Emperor of Japan, Hirohito.

== Early life ==
Tengku Musa Eddin was born in the Istana Temasya Jugra, Kuala Langat and was the eldest son of Sultan Alaeddin (1863–1938) by his royal consort Tengku Ampuan Maharum binti Raja Muda Tunku Dziauddin of Kedah.

Educated privately, he was made tengku mahkota in 1903. He succeeded his father's great-uncle Raja Laut bin Sultan Muhammad as Raja Muda (Crown Prince) of Selangor in 1920. An intelligent young man, he represented his father on the State Council established by the British colonial authority.

However, at the instigation of the British Resident, Theodore Samuel Adams (1885–1961; in office 1935–1937), Tengku Musa Eddin was dismissed as raja muda in 1934 for alleged "misbehaviour". Adams had accused Tengku Musa Eddin of being a spendthrift and wastrel with a penchant for gambling. However, many Malays in Selangor believed the real reason for Tengku Musa Eddin's dismissal was his refusal to follow Adams' orders.

Although Sultan Sulaiman pleaded for the case of Tengku Musa Eddin (even petitioning the Secretary of State for the Colonies and discussing the issue directly with him in London), Tengku Alam Shah was proclaimed raja muda over his other half-brother Tengku Badar. The appointment occurred on 20 July 1936.

Tengku Musa Eddin was given the title of Tengku Kelana Jaya Putera, ironically the title for the heir-apparent of the Yang di-Pertuan Muda (or Under-King) of Johor and Riau, from which the sultans of Selangor are descended.

Tengku Alam Shah was proclaimed sultan on 4 April 1938, four days after the death of his father. On 26 January 1939, he was crowned at the Istana Mahkota Puri Negara in Klang. Tengku Musa Eddin presided over the ceremony.

On 15 January 1942, during the Japanese occupation of Malaya, Colonel Fujiyama, the Japanese Military Governor of Selangor, invited Tengku Alam Shah, now Sultan Hisammudin, to King's House in Kuala Lumpur. In an interview with Major-General Minaki the Sultan confessed that he had made speeches in support of the British war efforts but had been persuaded by the British Resident to do so.

After being told to surrender the regalia to his older brother, the Japanese removed Sultan Hisamuddin and in November 1943, proclaimed Tengku Musa Eddin as the new Sultan of Selangor, taking the regnal name Sultan Musa Ghiatuddin Riayat Shah.

Sultan Hisamuddin declined to work with the Japanese and from 1943, refused the allowance they gave him and his children.

After the war, Sultan Musa was dethroned by the British Military Administration under Lord Louis Mountbatten upon their return to Malaya in 1945. Hisamuddin was reinstalled as Sultan of Selangor.

== Death ==
Sultan Musa was exiled to the Cocos (Keeling) Islands. Subsequently, he fell ill and was brought back to Selangor a few months before he died on 8 November 1955 in Kuala Lumpur. Sultan Musa was buried beside his father at the Royal Mausoleum in Klang. His consort, Syarifah Mastura Shahabuddin of Kedah, became Tengku Permaisuri or Queen during his brief reign. She died in 1958. The couple had no children.

Preceded by Sultan Hisamuddin Alam Shah	Sultan of Selangor; 1942–1945 (During Japanese Occupations)	Succeeded by Sultan Hisamuddin Alam Shah
