= Hisamuddin of Selangor =

King of Malaya in 1960

Hisamuddin حسام الدين
- Sultan of Selangor
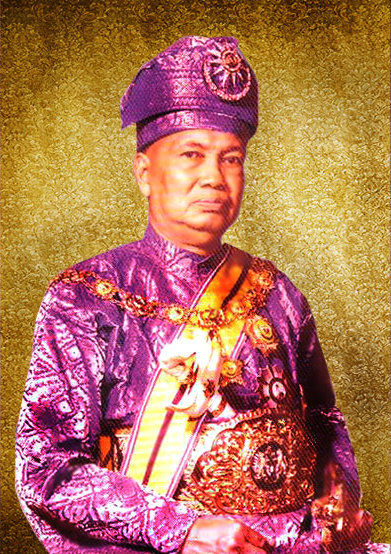
- Official portrait, 1960

King of the Federation of Malaya
- Reign: 14 April – 1 September 1960
- Predecessor: Abdul Rahman
- Successor: Putra

Sultan of Selangor
- First reign: 4 April 1938 – 15 January 1942
- Coronation: 26 January 1939
- Predecessor: Alaeddin Sulaiman Shah
- Successor: Musa Ghiatuddin Riayat Shah
- Second reign: 14 September 1945 – 1 September 1960
- Predecessor: Musa Ghiatuddin Riayat Shah
- Successor: Salahuddin Abdul Aziz Shah
- Born: 13 May 1898; Bandar Termasha, Kuala Langat, Selangor, Federated Malay States
- Died: 1 September 1960 (aged 62); Istana Tetamu, Kuala Lumpur, Federation of Malaya
- Burial: 3 September 1960; Royal Mausoleum, Klang, Selangor, Federation of Malaya
- Spouse: Tengku Ampuan Jemaah Binti Almarhum Raja Ahmad (m. 1920): Cik Puan Mariam; Cik Puan Hajah Kalsum Binti Haji Mahmud; Raja Halijah Binti Almarhum Sultan Idris Murshidul Azzam Shah Rahmatullah
- Issue Detail: Salahuddin of Selangor; Tengku Farida Shah; Tengku Kamil Shah; Tengku Azman Shah; Tengku Badli Shah; Tengku Hajah Raudzah; Tengku Ampuan Bariah; Tengku Ismail Shah; Tengku Taksiah
Names
- Tengku Alam Shah ibni Sultan Alauddin Sulaiman Shah
Regnal name
- Sultan Hisamuddin Alam Shah Alhaj ibni Almarhum Sultan Alauddin Sulaiman Shah
- House: Opu Daeng Chelak
- Father: Sultan Sir Alaeddin Sulaiman Shah ibni Al-Marhum Raja Muda Raja Musa
- Mother: Cik Puan Hasnah Binti Pilong
- Religion: Sunni Islam

Sultan Hisamuddin Alam Shah Alhaj Ibni Almarhum Sultan Alaeddin Sulaiman Shah (Jawi: سلطان حسام الدين عالم شاه الحاج ابن المرحوم سلطان علاء الدين سليمان شاه; 13 May 1898 – 1 September 1960) was Sultan of Selangor from 1938 to 1942, later from 1945, and the second Yang di-Pertuan Agong of the Federation of Malaya from 14 April, until his death on 1 September 1960.

== Early life and education ==
He was the third son of Sultan Alauddin Sulaiman Shah ibni Raja Muda Musa (1863–1938) by Cik Puan Hasnah binti Pilong, a commoner wife. Named Tengku Alam Shah at birth, he was not expected to succeed as he had two elder half-brothers, born to his father's royal consort.

Educated at the Malay College Kuala Kangsar, he was instrumental in the establishment of the Malay College Old Boys Association in 1929. In 1931, he was appointed Tengku Laksamana of Selangor, having previously served as Tengku Panglima Raja.

== Selangor succession dispute ==
Sultan Alaeddin Sulaiman Shah had multiple children, his first three sons being Tengku Musa Eddin, Tengku Badar Shah and Tengku Alam Shah. The first two sons were children by his royal consort, Tengku Ampuan Maharum binti Tengku Dhiauddin of the royal house of Kedah. In 1903, Tunku Musa Eddin had been made tengku mahkota and was promoted to raja muda (heir apparent) in 1920.

However, at the instigation of the British Resident, Theodore Samuel Adams (1885–1961; in office 1935–1937), Tengku Musa Eddin was dismissed as raja muda in 1934 for alleged "misbehaviour". Adams had accused Tengku Musa Eddin of being a spendthrift and wastrel with a penchant for gambling. However, many Malays in Selangor believed the real reason for Tengku Musa Eddin's dismissal was his refusal to follow Adams' orders.

Although Sultan Sulaiman pleaded for the case of Tengku Musa Eddin (even petitioning the Secretary of State for the Colonies and discussing the issue directly with him in London), Tengku Alam Shah was instead proclaimed raja muda over his other half-brother Tengku Badar. The appointment occurred on 20 July 1936.

== First reign as Sultan of Selangor ==
Tengku Alam Shah was proclaimed sultan on 4 April 1938, four days after the death of his father. On 26 January 1939, he was crowned at the Istana Mahkota Puri in Klang. Tengku Musa Eddin, then Tengku Kelana Jaya Putera, presided over the ceremony.

== Japanese occupation ==
On 15 January 1942, Colonel Fujiyama, the Japanese Military Governor of Selangor, invited Sultan Hisamuddin Alam Shah to the King's House in Kuala Lumpur. In an interview with Major-General Minaki, the Sultan confessed that he had made speeches in support of the British war efforts but had been persuaded by the British Resident to do so. After being told to surrender the regalia to his older brother, the Japanese removed Sultan Alam Shah and in November 1943, proclaimed Tengku Musa Eddin as Sultan Musa Ghiatuddin Riayat Shah of Selangor.

Sultan Hisamuddin Alam Shah declined to work with the Japanese and from 1943, refused the allowance they gave him and his children.

== Second reign as Sultan of Selangor ==
The return of the British brought Sultan Hisamuddin Alam Shah back to the throne, while Sultan Musa was exiled to the Cocos (Keeling) Islands. Although he had signed the Malayan Union treaty, like all other Malay rulers, he later repudiated it and gave open support to Malay nationalist effort to stop the plan.

On 1 March 1946, Sultan Alam Shah officiated the First Malay Unity Congress at the Sultan Sulaiman Club in Kuala Lumpur which was instrumental in creating the United Malays National Organisation. The congress was organised by the Selangor Malay Society which had as its president the scholar Zainal Abidin Ahmad (Za'ba), a critic of British colonial rule.

== Election as Deputy Yang di-Pertuan Agong ==
On 31 August 1957, by eight votes to one, Sultan Hisamuddin Alam Shah was elected Deputy Yang di-Pertuan Agong of independent Malaya.

== Election as Yang di-Pertuan Agong ==
Sultan Hisamuddin Alam Shah was elected second Yang di-Pertuan Agong of independent Malaya on the death of Abdul Rahman of Negeri Sembilan. His term of office began on 14 April 1960. On 30 July 1960 he proclaimed the end of the Malayan Emergency.

== Death and funeral ==
Sultan Hisamuddin Alam Shah died from an unidentified illness at the Istana Tetamu, in Kuala Lumpur on 1 September 1960, aged 62, the day set for his installation as Yang di-Pertuan Agong, and 141 days after his election as the Agong. Malaysian prime minister, Tunku Abdul Rahman, speculated that he died of a curse after trying on the royal kris before he was installed as king. He was interred at the Royal Mausoleum near Sultan Sulaiman Mosque in Klang, Selangor on 3 September 1960.

== Personal life and family ==
Sultan Hisamuddin Alam Shah was married at least twice:

1. in 1920 to Raja Jemaah binti Raja Ahmad (1900–1973), a member of a junior branch of the Selangor royal family, who served as Tengku Ampuan of Selangor and Raja Permaisuri Agong
2. in 1927 to Kalsom binti Mahmud (1905–1990), who was the mother of Tengku Ampuan Besar Bariah of Terengganu.
3. after 1927 to Raja Halija binti Al-Marhum Sultan Idris Murshidul Azzam Shah Rahmatullah of Perak and Cik Haji Ngah Uteh Mariah binti Haji Sulaiman, daughter of Dato Haji Sulaiman and Fatimah binti To' Bandar Lambin

He was succeeded by his son by Raja Jemaah, Tengku Abdul Aziz Shah, as Sultan of Selangor, taking the title of Sultan Salahuddin Abdul Aziz Shah. Sultan Salahuddin later became the 11th Yang di-Pertuan Agong and also died while in office.

== Awards and recognitions ==
=== Honour of Malaya ===
- Malaya
  - Recipient of the Order of the Crown of the Realm (DMN) (31 August 1958)

=== Foreign honours ===
- United Kingdom
  - Recipient of the King George V Silver Jubilee Medal (1935)
  - Recipient of the King George VI Coronation Medal (1937)
  - Honorary Knight Commander of the Order of St Michael and St George (KCMG) – Sir (1938)
  - Recipient of the Queen Elizabeth II Coronation Medal (1953)
- Brunei
  - Member First Class of the Family Order of Laila Utama (DK) – Dato Laila Utama (24 September 1958)

=== Places named after him ===
Several places were named after him, including:

- Kolej Islam Sultan Alam Shah (previously known as Kolej Islam Kelang), was named after him.
- Sekolah Alam Shah (now Sekolah Sultan Alam Shah), first in Cheras and then in Putrajaya, was named after him.
- SMS Alam Shah, carries the name of him after Sekolah Alam Shah moved to Putrajaya
- The City of Shah Alam and Istana Alam Shah in Klang was also named in his honour.
- Jalan Sultan Hishamuddin (formerly Victory Avenue), Kuala Lumpur was named after him
- Shah Alam Cemetery
- Shah Alam Circuit
- Shah Alam Expressway
- Shah Alam Komuter station
- Shah Alam Royal Mausoleum
- Shah Alam Royale Theatre
- Shah Alam Stadium
- Shah Alam Transfer Station
- Shah Alam–Puchong Highway
- Sultan Alam Shah Museum
- SK Shah Alam, a primary school in Shah Alam, Selangor
- SK Satu Sultan Alam Shah, a primary school in Petaling Jaya, Selangor
- SK (2) Sultan Alam Shah, a primary school in Petaling Jaya, Selangor
- SK Sultan Hisamuddin Alam Shah, a primary school in Kuala Lumpur
- SMK Shah Alam, a secondary school in Shah Alam, Selangor
- SAM Sultan Hisamuddin Sungai Bertih, a secondary school in Klang, Selangor
- SAMT Sultan Hisamuddin, a secondary school in Klang, Selangor
- Kolej Komuniti Shah Alam, a community college in Shah Alam, Selangor
- Shah Alam Hospital in Shah Alam, Selangor
- Taman Tasik Shah Alam
- Shah Alam National Botanical Park
- Persiaran Hishamuddin
- Persiaran Hishamuddin LRT station
- Sultan Hisamuddin Jamek Mosque, a mosque in Bandar Baru Salak Tinggi, Sepang, Selangor
- Sultan Hisamuddin Alam Shah Mosque, a mosque in Pekan Batu 14 (14th Mile Town) Hulu Langat, Selangor

Regnal titles
Preceded by Tuanku Abdul Rahman (Yang di-Pertuan Besar of Negeri Sembilan)	Yang di-Pertuan Agong (Supreme King of Malaysia); 1 April - 1 September 1960	Succeeded by Tuanku Syed Putra (Raja of Perlis)
Preceded by Sulaiman	Sultan of Selangor; 1937 - 1942	Succeeded by Musa Ghiatuddin Riayat Shah
Preceded by Musa Ghiatuddin Riayat Shah	Sultan of Selangor; 1945 - 1960	Succeeded by Salahuddin
