= Queen Victoria Memorial, Penang =

Memorial in Penang, Malaysia

The Queen Victoria Memorial in George Town, Penang is a monument to Queen Victoria, begun after her death, located at the Penang Chinese Recreation Club. Penang's Victoria Memorial takes the form of a large piece of land known as "Victoria Green," and a statue at the edge of Victoria Green at the junction of Burmah Road and Pangkor Road, the establishment of each being years apart from the other. The grounds were purchased and set up in 1903 and the statue unveiled in 1930, nearly three decades later.

== Demise of Queen Victoria ==
On 22 January 1901, Victoria, Queen of the United Kingdom of Great Britain and Ireland and Empress of India, died. Plans were made to raise monuments to her memory, in London, Lancaster, Liverpool, Calcutta (Kolkata), Melbourne, and in other places. It was no different in her Colonies in the Strait of Malacca.

== Singapore's Memorial ==
In Singapore, at a public meeting in the Town Hall, on 13 December (1901), the community resolved to erect a memorial hall, incorporating the existing Town Hall into its design. The meeting was chaired by Governor Sir Frank Swettenham. The fund-raising scheme for the project was led by the Colonial Government and $368,000 was raised. The Singapore Municipal Commissioners had, in January 1902, agreed to 'swell the Queen Victoria Memorial Fund,' with a municipal grant. In October 1902 a vote of $50,000 was entered by the Legislative Council in their estimates as a second moiety of the contributions from the Revenue of the Colony towards Singapore's Queen Victoria Memorial. Earlier on, it was reported, the public had contributed $140,000 and the Government, $80,000. $340,000 being needed, the balance of $28,000 was then used to refurbish the Town Hall's theatre, and also to make the façades of the two buildings look uniform. Named the Victoria Memorial Hall, it was officially declared open by Governor John Anderson on 18 October 1905, the part that was the Town Hall being renamed the Victoria Theatre. Today, they are referred to as the Victoria Theatre and Concert Hall, Singapore In 1905, a newspaper noted, "In mentioning the Victoria Memorial Hall, the report [Report on the Straits Settlements for the year 1905] makes the peculiar statement, for an official document, that it was erected 'by public subscriptions and generous contributions from the Municipality and the Government.'

And while the communities at the older northern settlement of Penang and the younger middle settlement at Malacca were invited to contribute to these, and, indeed, did so, Penang and Malacca decided to proceed with their own efforts to preserve the memory of their late monarch.

== Malacca's Memorial ==
Malacca's efforts took the form of a Victoria Memorial Fountain which was completed by the end of February 1905. Built by Messrs. Doulton and Sons on the banks of the River Thames, Malacca's Queen Victorial Memorial Fountain was constructed of glazed gresyish-green earthenware with blue tints and was situated on the clocktower green. It had been shipped over in numbered bricks for reassembly locally.

== Penang's Memorial ==
=== Conception ===
At Penang a public meeting was held towards the end of January 1902, to decide the question of having a local Queen Victoria Memorial. Chaired by Penang's Resident Councillor who opened the meeting by saying it was open to Penang to subscribe to Singapore's memorial but a resolution was being laid before those assembled to admit of Penang having a memorial of its own. Dr. Brown moved "That it is desirable to commemorate the memory of Her Late Most Gracious Majesty Queen Victoria in Penang." He said that it was meet that the late Queen's subjects at Penang should do something to signify their reverence and devotion to the memory of the Late queen and that they should give some permanent token of their appreciation of the benefits that had accrued to the Settlement of Penang from her reign. The resolution was seconded by Mr. Bryant. Mr. Ross moved "That the form such memorial shall take is that of a Public Park to be known hereafter by the name of Victoria Park," and this was carried unanimously. R. Yeats submitted "That a suitable site for the said park be selected by the Committee hereafter appointed as near to the centre of the town as possible, and that public subscriptions be immediately invited for the purpose of purchasing such site and putting the same into proper order and conditions as a Public Park. The funds subscribed to be applied by the said Committee at their discretion for the purposes set forth in the resolutions and for the disbursement of any reasonable expenses incurred in the conduct of the undertaking." This was seconded by Cheah Tek Thye and was carried. A. R. Adams pointed out that the task of the committee was difficult. The purchase of land and laying it out would involve a large amount of money. The site suggested covered eight to ten acres of land between Burmah Road and Macalister Road, to the east of Madras Lane and the cost of land was estimated to be no less than $50,000, quite apart from the cost of filling it and levelling it, and making open spaces for public recreation. Adams noted that unless the Chinese, who had all the money, could be induced to come forward in a substantial manner, the project could not be undertaken. Unlike the case of Singapore, it was noted that Penang could not expect any assistance from Government or the Municipality.

The Chinese community of Penang held a meeting on 10 March 1902 to discuss the proposal for a Victorial Memorial Green. The assembly resolved that Koh Cheng Sian despatch a congratulatory message to King Edward VIII and Queen Alexandra on their coronation; that all Chinese shops and houses be lit with lanterns and decorated with flags and "Chhye" on 25 and 26 June, which were to be observed as holidays; that a Victoria Memorial Fund be raised among the Chinese kongsis, societies and community, and that such fund might then be used to acquire suitable land for the Victorial Memorial Green, or some other laudable object to be agreed on; and that a life-size painting of "Queen Victoria in Her Majesty's advanced age should be ordered from England and suspended in the most conspicuous part of the [Penang] Chinese Town Hall."

=== Dissension ===
At this point, it appears, the Chinese community went their own way with the project. To understand why this happened, one must consider how they must have felt owing to the lack of support given by their Municipality and by Government, when contrasted with the Singapore situation, and the disparity in contributions received from or pledged by the Chinese and the European communities which in the words of A. R. Adams, present during the earlier meeting, stood at $10,000 from the Chinese for each $10 from Europeans. This appears to have created a schism and when the Chinese community later applied for permission to erect a pavilion at the Esplanade for their recreation, their application was rejected owing to a motion from Adams who objected to the application "to claim a portion of the Esplanade, after having decided to have a Victoria Memorial Park of their own there apart from the general community." A. K. Buttery seconded and the rejection was carried.

=== Victoria Memorial Green and Statue ===
The Chinese Community did, eventually, purchase the land. Its principal donors were Cheah Choo Yew, Cheah Tek Thye, Khaw Joo Tok, Chung Thye Phin, Lim Kek Chuan, Lim Eow Hong, Lim Cheng Teik, Yeoh Ooi Gark, Cheah Choon Seng, Ho Tiang Wan and Tan Kung Hock. The land was purchased to be held in trust and preserved for future generations of the Chinese community at Penang. Today it is in the hands of the Victoria Green Trustees and CRC (Chinese Recreation Club) Trustees, made up of members of the Cheah, Khoo, Lim, Tan and Yeoh Kongsis. Later, a statue of Queen Victoria was cast and mounted on a pedestal on that land and engraved on a marble inset were the words, "The Statue of Her Majesty Queen Victoria was erected in 1930 to commemorate her long and glorius reign. The site and the adjacent recreation ground to which the name 'Victoria Green' was given were bought by the Chinese Community in 1903 and dedicated for the use of the Chinese community in Perpetuity."

=== Unveiling of Statue by Governor Clementi ===
In 1930, Governor Sir Cecil Clementi was in Penang to unveil the Statue of Queen Victoria, at 10.30 a.m. on 23 April. This was his first visit to Penang since taking up the officer of Governor of the Straits Settlements. Arriving early in the morning from Malacca aboard the Sea Belle II the Governor and Lady Clementi dropped anchor in a special berth near Victoria Pier and were greeted by Harbourmaster Lieutenant-Commander Owen. On landing at Victoria Jetty, they were received by the Hon. Mr. Gilman and Justice Sproule. After an inspection of the guard and a talk on the development of Penang's port, the Governor and Lady Clementi proceeded on to the Residency. After resting a while they went over to Victoria Green to unveil the statue of Queen Victoria. They were received by Lim Seng Hooi and the trustees of Victoria Green. Lim, in his welcome address, informed the Governor that the ground had been bought and the statue commissioned and erected by the Chinese of Penang in sincere gratitude for Queen Victoria's regard for the Chinese community there during her reign. This had been done to perpetuate her memory and to commemorate their high esteem for her.

An entry in the Singapore Free Press described how the citizens of the Permier Settlement pulled down a large building to make room for the statue.

=== New Building on Victoria Green ===
In June 1930, Chinese Recreation Club President Lim Lean Teng laid the foundation stone of a new building at Victoria Green.

=== Illuminating the Victoria Memorial Statue ===
The statue was situated at the part of Victoria Green nearest to the junction of Burmah Road and Pangkor Road and to make it easy for the public who wished to examine the statue more closely without encroaching upon private property, the ground immediately surrounding the statue was declared public. The trustees of Victoria Green, through Municipal Commissioner Yeoh Cheang Aun, asked the Municipality to consider having the statue lit and night. Yeoh at a meeting of the Municipal Commission moved a resolution for free lighting to be provided, explaining the request of the trustees, pointing out that the statue had been intentionally located so close to the road to better serve public interests. Three members spoke against this and the resolution was carried by only one vote. Free lighting was then provided but this opposition brought about a strong feeling among the Chinese community that their gift to the public had been slighted. And while there may not have been any intention by the Municipal Commissioners to slight that gift, the impression among the public was that the municipal authorities were guilty of tactlessness and had missed an opportunity of fittingly replying to the act of courtesy by the Chinese of Penang.

=== Defying Japanese Vandalism ===
During World War II, the Japanese wanted to have the statue dismantled, dismounted, and carted away. They had done exactly that with the statue of Captain Francis Light, the founder of Penang (Wilcoxson had been commissioned to produce this six years after the Queen Victoria Memorial Statue was unveiled), and wished to remove this other reminder of British imperialism. Citizens loyal to the empire and the memory of their late monarch, had the memorial boarded up and prevented its removal. When Penang was finally liberated from Japanese Occupation, the boards were removed and the statue stood revealed, unscathed.
