= Edward Gent =

Malaysian politician

Sir Edward Gent KCMG DSO OBE MC
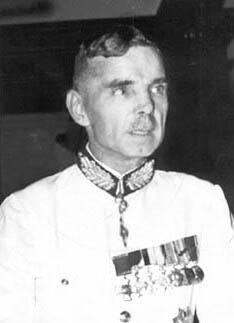

High Commissioner for Malaya
- In office 1 February 1948 – 4 July 1948
- Succeeded by: Sir Henry Gurney

Governor of the Malayan Union
- In office 1 April 1946 – 30 January 1948

Personal details
- Born: Gerard Edward James Gent; 28 October 1895 Kingston, UK
- Died: 4 July 1948 (age 52) Ruislip, Middlesex, UK
- Spouse: Guendolen Mary Wyeth
- Education: Trinity College, Oxford

Sir Edward James Gent KCMG DSO OBE MC (28 October 1895 – 4 July 1948) was the first appointed Governor of the Malayan Union in 1946. He was most famous for heading early British attempts to crush a pro-independence uprising in Malaya led by the Malayan Communist Party during the Malayan Emergency, before dying during the first year of the war in an aviation accident.

== Life ==
Gent was born in 1895, the son of John Gent (1844–1927) and Harriet (née Frankland) Randall. His original name was Gerard Edward James Gent, but for unknown reasons he changed it to Edward James Gent. He was educated at The King's School, Canterbury, and Trinity College, Oxford.

Gent married Guendolen Mary Wyeth in 1923, and they had four children, Marcus James Gent, Gerard Nicholas Gent, Ann Monica Gent and Janice Mary Gent.

== Military career ==
Gent served with the Duke of Cornwall's Light Infantry in the First World War in Flanders and Italy. He was wounded twice and was awarded the Military Cross in 1917 and the Distinguished Service Order in 1919.

== Diplomatic career ==
He was the first appointed Governor of the Malayan Union. He was an instrumental figure in the formation of the Malayan Union, which was established on 1 April 1946 in Kuala Lumpur.

== Malayan Emergency ==
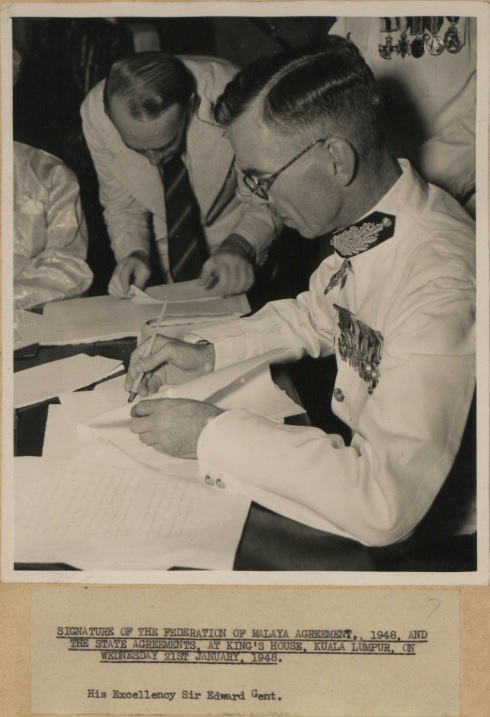
Signature of the Federation of Malaya Agreement, 1948, and the State Agreements, at King's House, Kuala Lumpur, on Wednesday 21 January 1948

Gent remained as the High Commissioner for Malaya when the Malayan Union was dissolved and replaced by the Federation of Malaya. But he did not remain at his post for long. He was sacked by the Colonial Office and recalled to London on 29 June 1948 at the onset of the Malayan Emergency after Malcolm MacDonald, the British Commissioner-General for Southeast Asia, lobbied Whitehall.

Gent disbelieved the communists were of any threat and refused to act. When the communists first launched their attacks on Malayan rubber estates, Gent on 16 June declared an emergency only in parts of Perak and Johor, much to the disappointment of the rubber planters, who called for a nationwide declaration of emergency. Gent was only forced to widen the declaration to the whole of Malaya the next day when the Straits Times wrote "Govern or Get Out" on its front page, thus galvanising public sentiment against him.

== Death ==
Gent was returning to the United Kingdom in an Avro York transport aircraft of the Royal Air Force when it collided with a Douglas DC-6 of Scandinavian Airlines System near Northwood, north London, a week after he was recalled to London.

Government offices
Preceded by Post created	Governor of the Malayan Union; 1946–1948	Succeeded by Post abolished
Preceded by Sir Shenton Thomas	British High Commissioner in Malaya; 1948–1948	Succeeded by Sir Henry Gurney
