= Shah Alam Transfer Station =

Solid waste transfer station

Shah Alam Transfer Station or SATS is a solid waste transfer station located in Section 21, Shah Alam. The site can be accessed by Jalan Puchong via KESAS Highway and Persiaran Jubli Perak via Federal Highway. SATS and its transportation system is owned by the Ministry of Urban Wellbeing, Housing and Local Government (KPKT) through SWCorp. Worldwide Holdings Bhd through WHB Environment was appointed as the maintenance operator (concessionaire) until May 2017. The current operator of SATS is Bumi Segar Indah Sdn Bhd (BSI). SATS costs in average RM800,000 a month to operate and send all waste compacted there to a sanitary landfill using special roll-off containers (silos) mounted on a haulage trailers. Apart from SATS that was built at Shah Alam, there are four more such similar transfer stations in Malaysia which located at Taman Beringin in Kuala Lumpur, Taruka at Johor, and another two at Batu Maung and Ampang Jajar, both located in Penang.

== Purpose-Built ==
The transfer station is the integral part of municipal solid waste management system. It essentially function as transit waste collection center en route to the landfill facilities. The concept of the transfer station is based on the fact that when the final disposal site is remote from the collection area, it will be more cost effective to transport the waste in larger load vehicles (long haulage).

SATS is built by WHB Environment on 10.55 acres land in the industrial zone of Section 21, shared the same road to a well known cemeteries managed by the local council at the same area in Section 21. SATS was originally purposes by the Majlis Bandaraya Shah Alam (MBSA) or Shah Alam City Council for its domestic waste management needs. But during the construction phase, the project ownership was transferred to KPKT after KPKT initially invested RM77 million to the project, allowing SATS to receive up to 1,200–1,900 ton of waste per day, not just from the MBSA but also has the capacity to take garbage from surrounding cities like Petaling Jaya City Council (MBPJ) and Subang Jaya Municipal Council (MPSJ). Previously, contractors serving MBPJ and MPSJ could only manage one to two trips daily (to the landfill) before the transfer station was in operation. Trip to Jeram in Kuala Selangor was too far for the contractors to travel and a bit costly.

== Design Concept ==
Compare to transfer station at Taman Beringin which use horizontal system, the design concept applied for SATS is a vertical compression system which the compactors are installed in level two of the transfer station building. The refuse collection truck will be directed to the tipping platform at level two and tip directly into the small hopper built over the silo. There are eight units of tipping bay or silo places provided in SATS supported by two units of mobile vertical compactors.

Advantages of SATS are:

1. The system is considered a simpler, more efficient and more economical solution than the horizontal principle, mainly because of the need for fewer containers (silos), compactors and haulage trailers;
2. Lighter constructions, less maintenance of the equipment and less required space for building and infrastructure likewise contribute to minimize the investment and operational costs per ton of waste.
3. The transfer station can also serve as a collection point for recyclable materials and site for inspecting and sorting the hazardous waste materials.
