= Wong Phui Nam =

Malaysian economist and poet (1935–2022)

- Traditional Chinese: 黃佩南
- Simplified Chinese: 黄佩南
Transcriptions
Standard Mandarin
- Hanyu Pinyin: Huáng Pèinán
- Bopomofo: ㄏㄨㄤˊ ㄆㄟˋㄋㄢˊ
- Gwoyeu Romatzyh: Hwang Peynan
Yue: Cantonese
- Jyutping: Wong^{4} Pui^{3} Naam^{4}
- IPA: [wɔŋ˩ pʰuj˧ nam˩]

Wong Phui Nam (Chinese: 黃佩南; Muslim name: Mohamed Razali; 20 September 1935 – 26 September 2022) was a Malaysian economist and poet. Born to a Peranakan family in Kuala Lumpur, Wong began learning English at age 9. He became interested in poetry, and while studying at the University of Malaya Singapore campus he wrote English language poetry while participating in a student literary magazine.

Shortly after his first collection of poetry was released in 1968, Wong stopped writing in response to the introduction of a national language policy that sidelined non-Malay work. His second collection of poems was released in 1989, and was followed by other works of collected poetry and two plays which adapted Greek tragedies to a Malaysian context.

Wong saw his work as part of the beginning of a Malaysian body of literature, viewing Malaysia as containing strands of other cultures rather than having developed a common national culture. Although Wong wrote in English, he felt no connection to the English literary tradition. Similarly, he felt little affinity to what is seen as Chinese culture, and described himself as an outsider in the country he considered his own. Wong's poetry often reflected these feelings, examining language, place, and identity.

== Biography ==
Wong was born in Kuala Lumpur on 20 September 1935 to a Peranakan Chinese family. He began learning English at the age of 9, following the end of the Japanese occupation of Malaya. At the same time he also attended a Chinese school, although he stated he took studying there less seriously, leaving him feeling more proficient in English. He was educated at the Batu Road School and the Victoria Institution.

Wong's interest in poems developed out of an interest in music, but a lack of access to a piano and formal teaching limited his expression to the spoken word. A key early influence was Rib of Earth by Edwin Thumboo, which was written in English by a local author, pushing against a feeling at the time that English literature was the preserve of white people.

Wong studied economics during college at the National University of Singapore (then part of the University of Malaya), where he was involved in the student-founded literary magazine The New Cauldron and was co-editor of two poetry anthologies from the university. The literary magazine's title reflected a desire that the magazine be a melting pot of the various cultures that existed in British Malaya. The first collection of his poems was published in 1958 under the name Toccata on Ochre Sheaves.

In 1964 some of Wong's poems were included in an anthology of Malaysian writing called Bunga Emas, that was published in the United Kingdom. A few years later in 1968, his poems were published in their own book, How the Hills are Distant, by the University of Malaya. His second collection of poems was published in 1989 by the National University of Singapore under the title Remembering Grandma and other Rumours, and included many poems examining death and a culture concerned only with bodily survival. Ways of Exile: Poems from the First Decade was published in 1993, collating previously published work. In 2000 Against the Wilderness was published, opening with a dedication to Rainer Maria Rilke. This work has been described as more coherent, using less poetic words than in previous work, portraying a dark view of both history and identity.

An Acre of Day's Glass: Collected Poems was published in 2006, collating his previous publications. However, some changes were made to the previous collections. Translations of Chinese poems within each previous book were grouped together into their own section. The book also included some portions of non-poetry, including parts of a 2005 speech explaining the fifteen years in which he did not write poetry between his first and second books.

His poems have also appeared in several other anthologies and literary journals. In 1988 his work was published in French by the University of Lille III. His work includes inspiration from various religious traditions, including Christianity, Egyptian mythology, Greek mythology, and Hindu deities. For example, the Osiris myth, where the body of Osiris is scattered across Egypt, is used to explore the idea of displacement across the physical landscape of Malaysia. Wong is also a noted anglophone poet, whose poetry has been described as a "series of lamentations". Scholar Leonard Jeyam has argued that with the publication of several notable poetry works by Wong Phui Nam in the 1980s and 1990s, Malaysian poetry in English, once an "underrated genre," "underwent a new surge of interest." His work is considered to be part of the origin of Malaysian English literature.

In June 2006, his first play Anike was produced by Maya Press. This play was an adaptation of Antigone into a Malaysian context. A second play, Aduni, similarly adapted Medea.

In 2013, he published the final version of The Hidden Papyrus of Hen-taui, a sequence of sonnets about the spiritual and ecstatic experiences of a neophyte priestess in ancient Egypt. Originally a collection of eight unrelated poems, it was revised for publication as a single volume. Jeyam has claimed that here Wong successfully "eschews the postcolonial poetic space of contemporary and historical Malaya but, instead, chooses to delve into the possibilities of discovering a more transcendent world in the burial and funerary mythmaking of ancient Egypt." Wong described the aim as exploring "the lack of spirituality in this country". The work was republished in 2019, with new additions and revisions leaving a total of 53 sonnets.

In his later years he remained engaged in the Malaysian poetry scene, assisting younger authors and judging the under-35 category in a 2021 national poetry competition. His work is included in some school curricula. He participated in recording audio versions of all of his poems, which were shared in August 2022 at A Wasteland Of Malaysian Poetry In English exhibition in Kuala Lumpur.

== Views on language and culture ==
I have written these poems for those who truly understand what it means to have to make one's language as one goes along.

— Wong Phui Nam, Preface to How the Hills Are Distant

Wong contended that the people of Malaysia had not fully developed into a nation with a coherent culture, and viewed his work as contributing to a new Malaysian identity. He did not write poetry in Chinese as he felt he could not claim his life was part of Chinese culture. He valued English for its practicality and widespread use, helping to compensate for the feeling that his family was "culturally rootless". Nonetheless, he did not view English as a language with an organic connection to his culture or emotions, a topic tackled explicitly in his poetry. He described his cultural background as being "stony rubbish", fragmented by place, migration, colonialism, and ethnicity. He spoke of a "triple alienation": from both Chinese tradition and Malay tradition, from the materialistic and un-spiritual culture he felt was imposed by the colonial government, and from the English language and its traditions, despite his use of the language.

In a 1999 interview, Wong stated that Malaysia was "deeply divided by language", and noted that English was culturally unrelated to any of the other languages in use there. Nonetheless he saw English as a useful language to reflect Malaysia, a product of colonialism that was "culturally naked". He did not see his work as part of English literary tradition, instead seeking to craft a new Malaysian literature for which there was no existing body of work. His use of English was practical, despite raising questions about whether the language matched his Malaysian identity. He sought to use English in a way that did not incorporate existing cultural and philosophical associations, to give his English poetry a Malaysian voice and break free from the traditions of the English poetry he learnt at school. Many of his poems were dedicated to other local prominent editors and authors who used the English language.

His sense of language alienation was most acute in the 1970s and early 1980s, when he stopped writing in part due to the Malaysian government's language policies which discouraged the use of English, with only Malay language texts usually being considered part of the national literature. While some authors from similar backgrounds emigrated from Malaysia, Wong did not, and some of his poetry addressed his feeling of cultural displacement and being considered an outsider in what he thought of as his own country. In his poetry, both language and physical landscape are used to explore the theme of identity. The inclusion of English versions of Chinese poetry in his books has been suggested as a way of affirming his Malaysian Chinese identity. He described them as "adaptations" rather than translations, reflecting his specific self-identity as a Malaysian Chinese rather than a Chinese person in China.

== Personal life ==
After graduating from university, Wong worked in banking and development financing. Wong and his wife Khatijah had three sons and one daughter.

Wong died on 26 September 2022 at age 87, and received an Islamic funeral.

== Books ==
- The Hidden Papyrus of Hen-taui (2013)
- Anike (2006)
- An Acre of Day's Glass: Collected Poems (2006)
- Against the Wilderness (2000)
- Ways of Exile (1993)
- Remembering Grandma and Other Rumours (1989)
- How the Hills Are Distant (1968)
