= Ma'ahad Muhammadi Lelaki =

Maahad Muhammadi Lelaki المعهد المحمدي للبنين

Location
- Kelantan; Malaysia
- Coordinates: 6.131754°N 102.257491°E

Information
- Type: State Government-funded religious school
- Established: April 1, 1937
- Session: Single
- School code: DXT 1018
- Principal: Mr Kamarjan bin Abdul Rahman
- Colours: Red, green, yellow & pink
- Yearbook: Al-Hikmah
- Website: yik.edu.my/sekolah/mml/

Maahad Muhammadi Lelaki or Maahad Muhammadi Lilbanin (Arabic: المعهد المحمدي للبنين; English: "Muhammadi Secondary School for Boys") is a prominent Islamic secondary school in Kelantan, Malaysia. It is located at Jalan Pengkalan Chepa, Mukim Padang Bongor, Kota Bharu. The school is state-funded and governed by the Islamic Foundation of Kelantan (Yayasan Islam Kelantan).

The school has played an important role in the history and course of academic development of Kelantan. It uses two-tier system in its education: conventional and Islamic academiae.

== History ==
The history of Maahad Muhammadi Lelaki can be traced back to the 1st of April, 1937 (Thursday; 20th of Muharram, 1356 AH), when it was founded as al-Madrasah al-Muhammadiah al-Arabiyah at Kelantan Council of Religion and Malay Custom Building (currently, the Islamic Museum of Kelantan; next-to Muhammadi Mosque) in Jalan Sultan by a royal charter from His Royal Highness Sultan Ismail ibni Sultan Muhammad IV, the then-Sultan of Kelantan.

The first principal was Mr Sayid Abu Bakr bin Abdullah bin Abdul Rahman Al-Attas, a Singaporean from Arab lineage. Its syllabus follows the Egyptian al-Azhar secondary school system, given to Mr Sayid by the then-Grand Imam of al-Azhar, Sheikh Mustafa al-Maraghi.

From being a school focusing only on Arabic and Islamic knowledge, it started to introduce English language subject into the syllabus on 1954, followed by Malay language subject in 1961. Social sciences studies such as History, Geography, Mathematics, Economics and Science was started in year 1971.

Al-Azhar University has recognized the certificate from Maahad Muhammadi (شهادة المعهد المحمدي) since year 1960.

Maahad Muhammadi Lelaki shares a common history with Maahad Muhammadi Perempuan and Maahad Muhammadi Pasir Pekan; but not with Maahad Muhammadi Tumpat, Maahad Muhammadi Rantau Panjang, or Maahad Muhammadi Pasir Mas.

Throughout its history, the school has changed its name several times:

- Al-Madrasah Al-Muhammadiah Al-Arabiah (1937-1942)
- Al-Madrasah Al-Arabiah Jame’ Merbau Al-Ismaili (1942-1956)
- Al-Maahad Al-Muhammadi Al-Qismu Al-Arabi (1956-1973)
- Al-Maahad Al-Muhammadi (1975-1982)
- The school was separated into Maahad Muhammadi Lelaki (for boys) dan Maahad Muhammadi Perempuan (for girls) (1 July 1982 – now)

Maahad Muhammadi Pasir Pekan was initially founded in 1989 as a temporary site to accommodate the male students in Pasir Pekan, Tumpat while waiting the current building to be completed. Later, it was made as a permanent school on its own as Maahad Muhammadi Pasir Pekan.

== Notable people ==
=== Faculty ===
- Datuk Nik Abdul Aziz Nik Mat, former Chief Minister of Kelantan
