= Shah Alam Royale Theatre =

- Teater Diraja Shah Alam
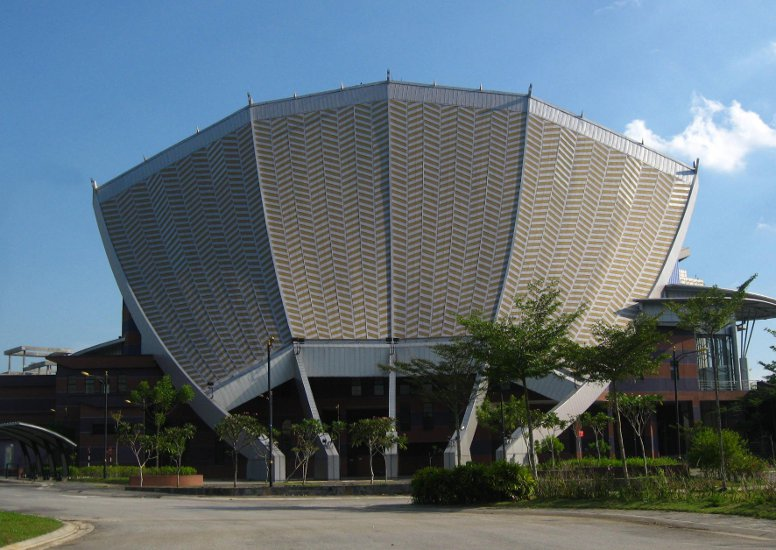
- Interactive map of the Shah Alam Royale Theatre area

General information
- Status: Completed
- Type: Theatre
- Location: Shah Alam, Selangor, Malaysia
- Coordinates: 3°4′29″N 101°31′24″E
- Construction started: December 2004
- Completed: July 2008
- Cost: RM 43 million
- Owner: Shah Alam City Council (MBSA)

Technical details
- Floor count: 6

Design and construction
- Developer: Kembang Serantau Sdn Bhd

Shah Alam Royale Theatre is a theater in Shah Alam, Selangor, Malaysia. It is located at Jalan Persidangan in section 14, just behind the Grand Blue Wave hotel. This theatre provides an alternative venue for local theatre productions besides Shah Alam City Council auditorium and Petaling Jaya Civic Centre. The theatre is aimed to function as the centre of cultural and performing arts and tourist attraction for Selangor, especially Shah Alam.

== Construction ==
This RM 43 million complex began its construction in December 2004 and was completed in July 2008, after about a year delay. The building was handed over to the Shah Alam City Council (MBSA) by the contractor Kembang Serantau Sdn Bhd.

== Architecture ==
Designed by Mohd. Zamzam Siran while his tenure as Design Architect with Kumpulan Akitek Sdn. Bhd. in 2003; Design & Build contractor is Kembang Serantau. This state-of-the-art building is constructed based on Malay-Bugis concept. The Shah Alam Royale Theatre was built at a cost of RM43 million.

Construction work started in December 2004 and the complex was completed in July 2008. It is located at Jalan Persidangan in Section 14, just behind the Grand Bluewave Hotel. The theatre was surrendered to the Shah Alam City Council (MBSA) by the contractor upon its completion date. However, the city council was only to serve as the caretaker of the complex.

The facility has since been surrendered to the state government which will decide as to who will manage the complex. The theatre provides another venue for local theatre productions in the state, besides the MBSA auditorium and the Petaling Jaya Civic Centre. Currently, local performers and artistes can also carry out their creative activity at the Laman Budaya at the Tasik Shah Alam, every weekend. The project was part of efforts to make Selangor, particularly Shah Alam, a centre for cultural and performing arts and, at the same time, attract tourists.

== Structure ==
The complex is a six-storey theatre block, completed with a main stage, easy-to-move stage, seating capacity of 800, conference rooms, multipurpose hall, cafeteria, exhibition hall, management office and surau. Ample parking spaces are provided for visitors, including parking spaces for the disabled.

== See also ==
- List of concert hall in Malaysia
- Culture of Malaysia
