= Stanley Wilson Jones =

Barrister and Colonial Administrator

Stanley Wilson Jones CMG
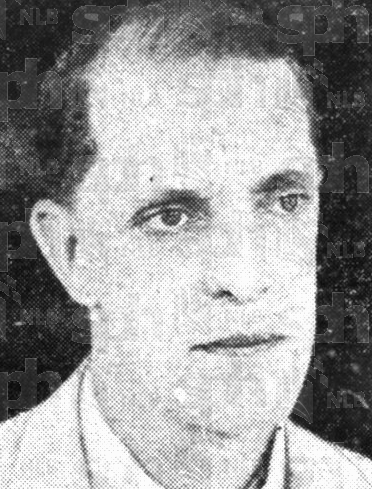
- Jones in 1939

19th Colonial Secretary of Straits Settlements
- In office 19 January 1940 – 27 January 1942
- Monarch: George VI
- Governor: Sir Shenton Thomas
- Preceded by: Sir Alexander Sym Small
- Succeeded by: Hugh Fraser (Acting)

British Resident of Selangor
- In office 1937–1939
- Monarch: George VI
- Preceded by: Theodore Samuel Adams
- Succeeded by: G. M. Kidd

Personal details
- Born: 1 July 1888
- Died: 17 January 1962 (aged 73)
- Spouse: Esther Olive Hartley (m. 1919)
- Children: 1 son and 2 daughters
- Parent: David Jones (father)
- Education: Manchester University
- Profession: Colonial Administrator

Stanley Wilson Jones CMG (1 July 1888 – 17 January 1962) was a colonial administrator. He was a cadet of Malayan Civil Service in 1911 and spent his civil service career in Federated Malay States and Straits Settlements. He was the British Resident of Selangor and Colonial Secretary of Straits Settlements.

== Career ==
=== Federated Malay States ===
Jones entered the Malayan Civil Service as a cadet in 1911 and was as acting Assistant District Officer (Pekan) and during the First World War held similar position at Lipis. He was later being appoint the Assistant District Officer in Kuantan, Pekan and Kuala Kangsar and later District Officer in Jelebu and Kuala Lipis as well as acting District Officer in Klang and Kuantan. In 1924, he was attached for special duty to the Federal Secretariat, Kuala Lumpur. In 1927, he was Acting Commissioner of Trade (Johore) and in 1931 to 1932 as acting Legal Adviser (Johore). In 1932 and 1933, he was the Acting General Adviser (Johore) and Commissioner of Lands and Mines (Johore). In 1935, he went to Kedah as Acting British Adviser and later Acting Under-Secretary to the Federal Government. In 1937 to 1939, he was the British Resident of Selangor.

=== Straits Settlements ===
In 1934, Jones was transferred to Singapore's Land Office as Acting Commissioner of Lands in January 1935.

In 1940, he was appointed as the new Colonial Secretary of Straits Settlements when Sir Alexander Small retired. In January 1942, he was unwillingly transferred out of Singapore to United Kingdom and was replaced by Hugh Fraser before the fall of Singapore to the Japanese Occupation.

== Honours ==
Jones was invested with Companion of the Most Distinguished Order of St. Michael and St. George (CMG) in 1939.

== Personal life ==
Jones was born in 1888 as the youngest son of Mr David Jones, Manchester. He married Esther Olive Hartley in 1919 and has one son and two daughters.

He was educated in Humle Grammar School in Manchester and graduated in B.A. from Manchester University.

In 1931, he was called to the Bar of the Middle Temple but never practised as a barrister.

Jones died in 1962.

Government offices
Preceded by Sir Alexander Sym Small	Colonial Secretary of Straits Settlements; 1940–1942	Succeeded by Hugh Fraser as Acting Colonial Secretary
Preceded by Theodore Samuel Adams	British Resident of Selangor; 1937–1939	Succeeded by G. M. Kidd
