= Cheah Tek Thye =

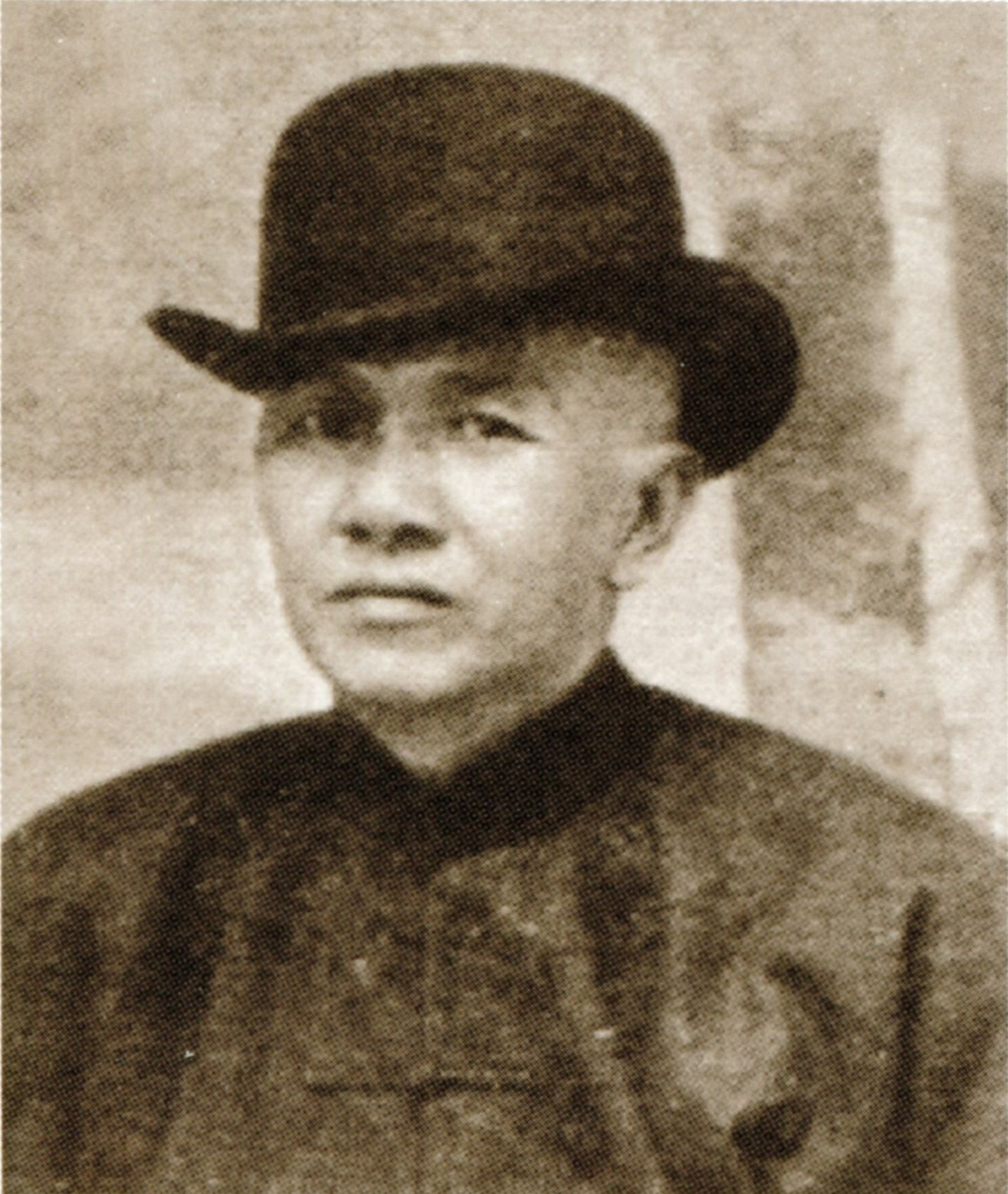

Cheah Tek Thye (Xie Detai / 謝德泰; 1890 – 12 January 1935) was a 19th-century Penang businessman, banker, and lawmaker and a principal headman of the "Cheah" clan.

== Biography ==
Born in 1890, Cheah was educated at Penang Free School, St. Xavier's Institution, Penang, and Doveton College, Calcutta. He joined Chop Sin Eng Moh, tin merchants, after which he joined the Penang Khean Guan Insurance Co., then the only Chinese Insurance company with headquarters in the Straits Settlements, and he was its secretary for years. He was also proprietor of the Eng-Moh-Hui-Thye-Ke estate at Semelin (Kedah), and a director of the Chinese Oversea Bank. For some time Cheah acted as agent for Lipton's wines, but transferred this agency to Messrs. J. W. Halifax and Co. He was a warm supporter of the turf for a number of years. At one time he owned several racehorses, and won many races. He was twice elected a Municipal Commissioner, and was on the committee of the Penang Free School. He was also one of the principal headmen of the "Cheah" clan.

Cheah was the proprietor of the more than 3,400-acre Eng-Moh-Hui-Thye-Kee estate in Semelin (Kedah) that, in 1907, was planted with over 20,000 coconut trees and 30,000 rubber trees. At that time, the estate, which employed 300 men, was selling about 10,000 coconuts a month.

He began working life at his brother Cheah Tek Soon's firm, Sing Eng Moh & Co, and served many years as the Secretary of the Penang Khean Guan Insurance Company. He was also a Director of the Chinese Oversea Bank.

He was a George Town Municipal Commissioner and, by 1907, he had been twice elected to serve on that body.

Cheah was a member of the committee that managed the affairs of the Penang Free School. He served alongside Resident Councillor Robert Norman Bland, Colonial Chaplain Rev. Francis William Haines, Inspector of Schools A. E. Pringle, Assistant Protector of Chinese D. Bently, G. Copley, W. A. Bicknell, A. D. Neubronner, C. G. May, Gan Ngoh Bee, Leong Lok Heng, Chung Thye Phin, Yeoh Guan Seok, and Lim Eow Hong.

He was part of the group who met in January 1902 and decided upon a separate Queen Victoria Memorial for Penang. Cheah seconded the motion that the memorial be situated in a park. The suggested site, comprising between eight and ten acres, lay between Burmah and MacAlister Roads, to the east of Madras Lane, and was estimated to cost at least $50,000 at that time. At that meeting, attended, among others, by the Resident Councillor. Brown, Messrs. Bryant, Ross, and Yeats, Mr Adam pointed out that unless the Chinese could be induced to come forward in a most substantial manner, there would be an end to this. All present concurred that the Chinese had the money and that no assistance could be expected from either the government or the municipality. The Queen Victoria Memorial exists today in the grounds of the Chinese Recreation Club, Penang.

In 1903, Cheah presented the Penang Turf Club with a two-faced turret clock. Its dials were three feet in diameter. The clock was placed in a tower on the race course.

In 1909 he was accused of cheating in respect of $70 and a document, but, tried before Justice Hamilton, Cheah, who had pleaded not guilty, was acquitted.

In mid-1925, Cheah was appointed to the Commission of the Peace, Penang. His appointment was effected through a notice in the Government Gazette Extraordinary issued on 4 June 1925. Appointed Justices of the Peace together with him were, from Penang, Ernest Edward Deacon, Koh Lip Teng, Albert Stanley McKern, John Mathewson Milne, A. R. K. Muthiya Chettiar, Hugh Scott Russell, and Tan Lo Heong.

Cheah was the son of Penang merchant Cheah Chow Pan, born in 1860. His brothers were Cheah Tek Soon and Cheah Tek Lee. He was educated at the Penang Free School, and St. Xavier's Institution in George Town, Penang, and at Doveton College, Calcutta.

Cheah's first wife was the daughter of daughter of Koh Teng Choon. After she died, he married the daughter of Gim Tong. He had four sons and four daughters. His son, Cheah Toon Lok, was a Jordan Scholar in Tropical Medicine.

Cheah Tek Soon died on 12 January 1935, at his home in Northam Road, George Town, Penang, and his remains were later interred at the Cheah Cemetery at Mount Erskine.
