= Alaeddin Mosque (Jugra, Malaysia) =

Historical mosque in Jugra, Selangor, Malaysia

- Masjid Alaeddin
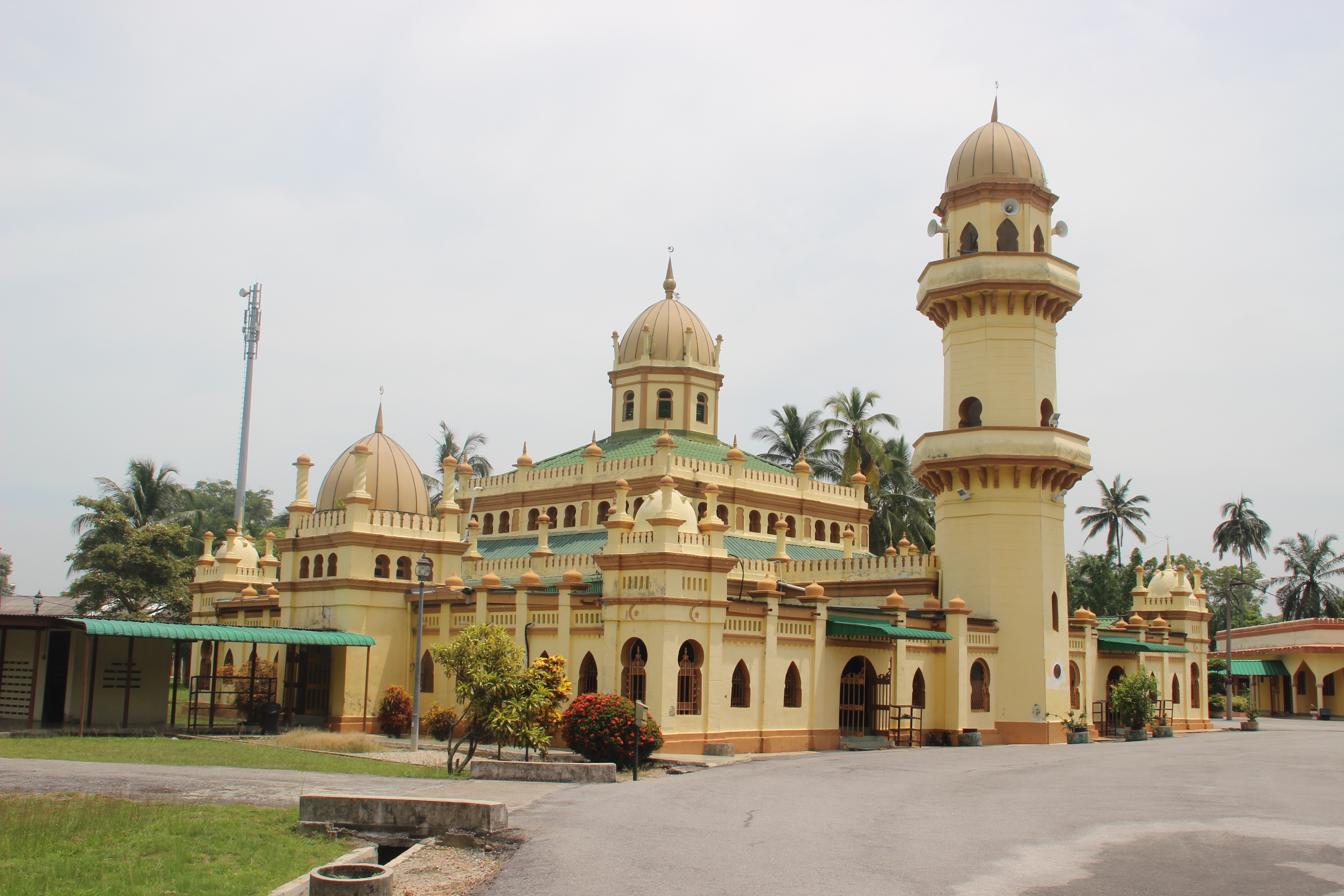

- Location within Selangor

Religion
- Affiliation: Islam

Location
- Location: Jugra, Selangor, Malaysia
- Interactive map of Alaeddin Mosque
- Coordinates: 2°51′49.1″N 101°26′23.2″E

Architecture
- Type: mosque
- Style: Deli Kingdom
- Groundbreaking: 1918
- Completed: 1924
- Minaret: 1

Alaeddin Mosque is a historical mosque in Jugra, Kuala Langat District, Selangor, Malaysia. In 2008, the mosque was gazetted as a National Heritage Site (Tapak Warisan Negara).

Also known as Masjid Alaeddin and Masjid Bandar, the mosque was built in 1918 and officiated by a former Sultan of Selangor, Sultan Alaeddin Suleiman Shah Ibni Raja Muda Musa in 1924.

== History ==
The mosque was constructed between 1903 and 1905, and was officially opened in 1906 by Almarhum Sultan Sir Alaeddin Sulaiman Shah of Selangor.

== Architecture ==
The architectural style of the mosque is influenced by design elements from the Sultanate of Deli Kingdom from North Sumatera, Indonesia.

== See also ==
- Islam in Malaysia
