= Malayan Union =

Post-war federation of the Malay states and the Straits Settlements of Penang and Malacca

Malayan Union Kesatuan Malaya (Malay)
- 1946–1948
- Flag Coat of arms

- Location of the Malayan Union (green)
- Status: British colony
- Capital: Kuala Lumpur; 3°8′N 101°41′E
- Common languages: Malay (official); English
- Religion: Sunni Islam (official); Buddhism; Roman Catholicism; Hinduism; Protestantism; Malaysian folk religion Animistic religion
- King
  - 1946–1948: George VI
- Governor
  - 1946–1948: Edward Gent
- Historical era: Decolonisation
  - Established: 1 April 1946
  - Disestablished: 31 January 1948
- Currency: Malayan dollar
Preceded by	Succeeded by
British Military Administration	Federation of Malaya
- Today part of: Malaysia

The Malayan Union (Malay: Kesatuan Malaya; Jawi: كساتوان مالايا) was a union of the Malay states and the Straits Settlements of Penang and Malacca. It was the successor to British Malaya and was conceived to unify the Malay Peninsula under a single government to simplify administration. Following opposition by the ethnic Malays, the union was reorganised as the Federation of Malaya in 1948.

== Formation of the Malayan Union ==
Prior to World War II, British Malaya consisted of three groups of polities: the protectorate of the Federated Malay States, five protected Unfederated Malay States and the crown colony of the Straits Settlements.

On 1 April 1946, the Malayan Union officially came into existence with Sir Edward Gent as its governor, combining the Federated Malay States, Unfederated Malay States and the Straits Settlements of Penang and Malacca under one administration. The capital of the Union was Kuala Lumpur. The former Straits Settlement of Singapore was administered as a separate crown colony.

The idea of the Union was first expressed by the British in October 1945 (plans had been presented to the War Cabinet as early as May 1944) in the aftermath of the Second World War by the British Military Administration. Sir Harold MacMichael was assigned the task of gathering the Malay state rulers' approval for the Malayan Union in the same month. In a short period of time, he managed to obtain all the Malay rulers' approval. The reasons for their agreement, despite the loss of political power that it entailed for the Malay rulers, has been much debated; the consensus appears to be that the main reasons were that as the Malay rulers were resident during the Japanese occupation, they were open to the accusation of collaboration, and that they were threatened with dethronement. Hence the approval was given, though it was with utmost reluctance.

When it was unveiled, the Malayan Union gave equal rights to people who wished to apply for citizenship. It was automatically granted to people who were born in any state in British Malaya or Singapore and were living there before 15 February 1942, born outside British Malaya or the Straits Settlements only if their fathers were citizens of the Malayan Union and those who reached 18 years old and who had lived in British Malaya or Singapore "10 out of 15 years before 15 February 1942". The group of people eligible for application of citizenship had to live in Singapore or British Malaya "for 5 out of 8 years preceding the application", had to be of good character, understand and speak the English or Malay language and "had to take an oath of allegiance to the Malayan Union". However, the citizenship proposal was never actually implemented. Due to opposition to the citizenship proposal, it was postponed then modified, which made it harder for many Chinese and Indian residents to obtain Malayan citizenship.

The Sultans, the traditional rulers of the Malay states, conceded all their powers to the British Crown except in religious matters. The Malayan Union was placed under the jurisdiction of a British Governor, signalling the formal inauguration of British colonial rule in the Malay peninsula. Moreover, while the State Councils were still kept functioning in the former Federated Malay States, they lost the limited autonomy that they enjoyed, left to administer only some less important local aspects of government, and became an extended hand of the Federal government in Kuala Lumpur. Also, British Residents replacing the Sultans as the head of the State Councils meant that the political status of the Sultans was greatly reduced.

A Supreme Court was established in 1946 of which Harold Curwen Willan was the only Chief Justice.

== Opposition, dissolution of the Malayan Union and the creation of the Federation of Malaya ==
Before the Malayan Union citizenship was drafted by the British government in 1943, they had received memoranda on this citizenship issue from two Malays, namely Tengku Mahmood Mahyideen and Mohamed Suffian Hashim. Tengku Mahmood stated that Malayan citizenship should be formed in Malaya so that all persons born and residing in Malaya and who abandoned their basic nationality would be eligible for Malayan citizenship.

The second memorandum came from Mohamed Suffian Hashim, who at the time was working in the Indian Malay Radio Section. In his letter to Sir Richard Winstedt, an officer of the Malayan Civil Service, he stated:

The creation of Malayan Citizenship is of great interest and I think might help to solve the Chinese problem…It is interesting to note that Ceylon used to have an Indian problem and I am told that Ceylon solves their problem by having order and above British nationality something which may conveniently be called Ceylon citizenship…

— (Letter from M. Suffian to R.O. Winstedt, 27 February 1943)

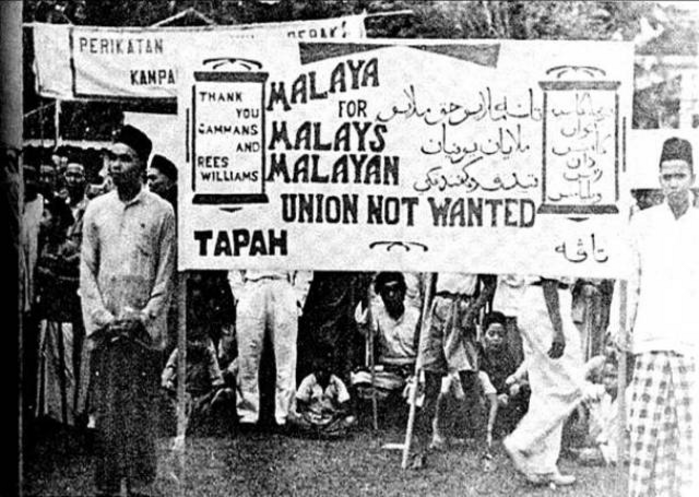
Protest against the Malayan Union by Malays. The banner expresses gratitude to Leonard David Gammans and David Rees-Williams, two Members of Parliament who were sent by the British government to survey local reactions to the formation of the Union.

The Malays generally opposed the creation of the Union. The opposition was due to the methods Sir Harold MacMichael used to acquire the Sultans' approval, the reduction of the Sultans' powers, and easy granting of citizenship to immigrants. The United Malays National Organisation or UMNO, a Malay political association formed by Dato' Onn bin Ja'afar on 10 May 1946, led the opposition against the Malayan Union. Malays also wore white bands around their heads, signifying their mourning for the loss of the Sultans' political rights.

After the inauguration of the Malayan Union, the Malays, under UMNO, continued opposing the Malayan Union. They used civil disobedience as a means of protest by refusing to attend the installation ceremonies of the British governors. They also refused to participate in the meetings of the Advisory Councils. The British recognised this problem and took measures to consider the opinions of the major races in Malaya before making amendments to the constitution. The Malayan Union was dissolved and replaced by the Federation of Malaya on 1 February 1948.

== List of member states ==
- Johor
- Kedah
- Kelantan
- Negeri Sembilan
- Pahang
- Perak
- Perlis
- Selangor
- Terengganu

== Evolution towards Malaysia ==
Evolution of Malaysia

== See also ==
- Bumiputera (Malaysia)

== Notes ==
1. Rarely used; often referred by its English name Malayan Union in textbooks and official material.
