= Christopher Dominic Ahearne =

Colonial administrator (1886–1964)

Christopher Dominic Ahearne CMG

Federal Secretary of the Federated Malay States (FMS)
- In office February 1936 – 1939
- Monarchs: Edward VIII; George VI
- High Commissioner of FMS: Sir Shenton Thomas
- Preceded by: Marcus Rex (as Chief Secretary to the Government of the FMS)
- Succeeded by: Hugh Fraser

Personal details
- Born: 1886
- Died: 1964 (aged 77–78)
- Occupation: Colonial Administrator

Christopher Dominic Ahearne CMG (1886 – 1964) or C D Ahearne was a colonial administrator. He entered Straits Settlement Government service in 1910 as a cadet and was later the Federal Secretary of the Federated Malay States (FMS) in 1936.

== Career ==
=== Early career ===
Ahearne entered Straits Settlement Government service as a cadet in 1910 and was attached to the Indian Immigrant Department in Penang. He was appointed as acting District Officer (Balik Pulau) in 1911 and in 1916 as the District Officer of Balik Pulau. He held several posts of acting 2nd Assistant Superintendent of Immigrant (Klang and Kuala Lumpur), acting Assistant Controller of Labour (Kuala Lumpur, Penang and Klang) in 1913 and 1914. He was acting Assistant Adviser (Batu Pahut, Johore) in 1919 and in 1923 as Second Magistrate in Singapore, Deputy Controller of Labour (Kuala Lumpur) and acting Deputy Controller of Labour (Penang).

=== Duties at the Indian Immigration Committee ===
Ahearne was part of the important commission in 1925, on special duty for Indian Immigration Committee in connection with the Avadi Water Supply and Drainage as well as proceed to Assam to investigate labour condition in British India.

=== Since the 1930s ===
Ahearne was the Controller of Labour for Malaya in 1930 and in the following year as the leader of the Straits Settlements Delegation to the International Shipping Conference held in Simila. During the slump, he served as the chairman of the Straits Settlements Retrenchment Committee. In 1933, he was on a special duty to lead a Malayan delegation to New Delhi to discuss on the immigration questions with the Indian Government. He was appointed as first Federal Secretary of the Federated Malay States in 1936 to 1939, which was created under the decentralised policy of Sir Cecil Clementi.

== Honours ==
Ahearne was invested with Companion of the Most Distinguished Order of St. Michael and St. George (CMG) in 1939.

Government offices
Preceded by Marcus Rex as Chief Secretary to the Government of the FMS	Federal Secretary of the Federated Malay States; 1936 – 1939	Next: Hugh Fraser
