= Marcus Rex =

Colonial Administrator

Marcus Rex CMG

20th British Resident of Perak
- In office 1939–1941
- Preceded by: Sir Geoffrey Edmund Cator
- Succeeded by: Arthur Vincent Aston

Chief Secretary to the Government of the FMS
- In office 1935–1936
- Preceded by: Malcolm Bond Shelley
- Succeeded by: Christopher Dominic Ahearne (as Federal Secretary of the FMS)

Personal details
- Born: 11 September 1886
- Died: 28 September 1971 (aged 85)
- Education: Trinity College
- Occupation: Colonial administrator

Marcus Rex, CMG (11 September 1886 – 28 September 1971) was the last British Resident of Perak

== Education and career ==
Rex's early education was at Highgate School, London, after which he gained a Bachelor of Arts (BA) degree from Trinity College, Cambridge in 1908. Rex began his service as a Malayan Civil Service cadet in 1910, he was soon promoted to Assistant to the Resident of Perak in 1912 and 1915. Rex also posted as District Officer of Kuala Kangsar in 1913. In 1917, he became the Superintendent of Opium in the State of Selangor, Negeri Sembilan and Pahang. Rex became the District Officer of Raub in 1919. He was the British Secretary for Federated Malay States in 1935 – 1936 and the last British Resident of Perak 1939 - 1941.

Rex was invested with Companion of the Most Distinguished Order of St. Michael and St. George (CMG) in 1941.

Government offices
Preceded by Malcolm Bond Shelley	Chief Secretary to the Government of the FMS; 1935 – 1936	Succeeded by Christopher Dominic Ahearne as Federal Secretary of the FMS
Preceded by Sir Geoffrey Edmund Cator	British Resident of Perak; 1939 – 1941	Succeeded by Arthur Vincent Aston
