= List of high commissioners of the United Kingdom for Malaya =

In 1896, the post of High Commissioner for the Federated Malay States was created; the High Commissioner represented the British Government in the Federated Malay States, a federation of four British protected states in Malaya. The High Commissioner's official residence was King's House (now part of a hotel, Carcosa Seri Negara), located inside the Perdana Lake Gardens in Kuala Lumpur, the capital of the Federated Malay States. King's House served as an important place for royal dignitaries and distinguished guests.

The Governor of the Straits Settlements had always been ex-officio the High Commissioner for the Federated Malay States; the Governor's official residence was in Singapore, the capital of the Straits Settlements, and was known as Government House (now the Istana, official residence of the President of Singapore).

In each of the five protected states of Perlis, Kedah, Kelantan, Trengganu, and Johore (collectively referred to as the Unfederated Malay States), the British government was represented by an Adviser: the Adviser to the Government of Perlis; the Adviser to the Sultan of Kedah; the Adviser to the Government of Kelantan; the Adviser, Trengganu; and the General Adviser to the Government of Johore.

The Straits Settlements was dissolved in 1946. Singapore became a Crown colony in its own right. The rest of the Straits Settlements (i.e. Penang and Malacca) were merged with the Federated Malay States, Perlis, Kedah, Kelantan, Terengganu, and Johore to form the Malayan Union, another Crown colony. The native rulers in the Federated Malay States, Perlis, Kedah, Kelantan, Trengganu, and Johore ceded their power to the United Kingdom, thus turning these territories into British colonies. The new Crown colony of the Malayan Union was headed by a Governor – the Governor of the Malayan Union.

In 1948, the British government returned power to the native rulers of the former protected states, and the Malayan Union was transformed into the Federation of Malaya – a federation of protected states and Crown colonies (Penang and Malacca had remained Crown colonies throughout the Malayan Union era). The Federation of Malaya was headed by the High Commissioner for Malaya.

When Malaya gained independence from the United Kingdom, the position of the High Commissioner for Malaya as the de facto head of state was replaced by the Paramount Ruler, or the Yang Di-Pertuan Agong, of Malaya, appointed by the rulers of the nine Malay states. The title 'High Commissioner' became that of the senior British diplomat in the independent Malaya (and later in Malaysia), as is normal in Commonwealth countries.

== List of high commissioners and governors of the United Kingdom for Malaya ==
Federated Malay States, Malayan Union, Federation of Malaya
№	Portrait	Name	Tenure	
№	Portrait	Name	From	Until
High Commissioner for the Federated Malay States (1896–1946)
1		Lieutenant-Colonel Sir Charles Bullen Hugh Mitchell	1 January 1896	7 December 1899
2		James Alexander Swettenham	8 December 1899	18 February 1901
3		Sir Frank Athelstane Swettenham	26 September 1901	12 October 1903
4		Sir John Anderson	15 April 1904	9 April 1911
5		Sir Arthur Henderson Young	9 September 1911	24 August 1920
6		Sir Laurence Nunns Guillemard	3 February 1920	5 May 1927
7		Sir Hugh Charles Clifford	3 June 1927	20 October 1930
8		Sir Cecil Clementi	5 February 1930	16 February 1934
9		Sir Shenton Whitelegge Thomas	9 November 1934	15 August 1945
Japanese occupation of Malaya From 31 January 1942 to 15 August 1945.
British Military Administration (15 August 1945 – 30 March 1946)
Governor of the Malayan Union (1946–1948)
10		Sir Gerard Edward James Gent	1 April 1946	30 January 1948
High Commissioner for Malaya (1948–1957)
11		Sir Gerard Edward James Gent	1 February 1948	4 July 1948
12		Sir Henry Lowell Goldsworthy Gurney	1 October 1948	6 October 1951
13		General Sir Gerald Walter Robert Templer	15 January 1952	31 May 1954
14		Sir Donald Charles MacGillivray	31 May 1954	31 August 1957

== See also ==
- Federated Malay States
- Unfederated Malay States
- Straits Settlements
- List of high commissioners of the United Kingdom to Malaysia
