= Theodore Samuel Adams =

British colonial civil servant

Sir Theodore Samuel Adams
- Adams in July 1948
- Born: 1885
- Died: 1961 (aged 75–76)
- Occupation: Colonial civil servant

Sir Theodore Samuel Adams (1885–1961) was a British colonial civil servant.

Adams graduated from All Souls College, University of Oxford and entered the British colonial civil service. His first post was as a cadet in the Federated Malay States in 1908. In 1946, he became an advisor for the Malay kings in Malaya. He then had a succession of more senior appointments in Malaya before becoming Chief Commissioner of the Northern Provinces of Nigeria from 1937.

Adams played a part in the Selangor succession dispute.
