= C. C. Brown =

American football player (born 1983)

No. 24, 41, 39, 38
- Position: Safety

Personal information
- Born: January 27, 1983 (age 43); Greenwood, Mississippi, U.S.
- Listed height: 6 ft 0 in (1.83 m)
- Listed weight: 208 lb (94 kg)

Career information
- High school: Greenwood
- College: Louisiana-Lafayette
- NFL draft: 2005: 6th round, 188th overall pick

Career history
- Houston Texans (2005–2008); New York Giants (2009); Detroit Lions (2010); Jacksonville Jaguars (2011)

Awards and highlights
- First-team All-Sun Belt (2004); Second-team All-Sun Belt (2003)

Career NFL statistics
- Total tackles: 374
- Sacks: 1.0
- Forced fumbles: 8
- Fumble recoveries: 4
- Interceptions: 3
- Stats at Pro Football Reference

Ceandris Nehemiah Brown (born January 27, 1983) is an American former professional football player who was a safety in the National Football League (NFL). He was selected by the Houston Texans in the sixth round of the 2005 NFL draft. He played college football for the Louisiana-Lafayette Ragin' Cajuns, and was also enlisted in the Mississippi National Guard.

Brown was also a member of the New York Giants, Detroit Lions and Jacksonville Jaguars.

== Professional career ==
=== Houston Texans ===
Brown was selected by the Houston Texans in the sixth round of the 2005 NFL draft. He started in all of his four years with the Texans.

=== New York Giants ===
Brown became a free agent in 2009 and signed a one-year deal with the New York Giants. He was tendered a one-year contract by the Giants following the 2009 NFL season, but the tender was withdrawn after the Giants signed Deon Grant.

=== Detroit Lions ===
On May 10, 2010, Brown signed a contract with the Detroit Lions.

== NFL career statistics ==
Legend
**Bold**	Career high

Year	Team	Games		Tackles					Interceptions					Fumbles			
Year	Team	GP	GS	Cmb	Solo	Ast	Sck	TFL	Int	Yds	TD	Lng	PD	FF	FR	Yds	TD
2005	HOU	**16**	13	80	54	**26**	0.0	**3**	**1**	5	0	5	2	1	0	0	0
2006	HOU	15	15	77	**67**	10	**1.0**	1	**1**	0	0	0	5	1	1	0	0
2007	HOU	**16**	**16**	**84**	64	20	0.0	1	**1**	**9**	0	**9**	**8**	2	**3**	**19**	0
2008	HOU	3	3	15	12	3	0.0	0	0	0	0	0	1	0	0	0	0
2009	NYG	**16**	7	69	59	10	0.0	**3**	0	0	0	0	3	**3**	0	0	0
2010	DET	15	8	46	37	9	0.0	1	0	0	0	0	4	1	0	0	0
2011	JAX	2	0	3	2	1	0.0	0	0	0	0	0	0	0	0	0	0
		83	62	374	295	79	1.0	9	3	14	0	9	23	8	4	19	0

== Healthcare fraud case ==
Brown was charged with one count of conspiracy to commit wire fraud and health care fraud, one count of wire fraud, and one count of health care fraud by the United States Department of Justice on December 12, 2019. He initially pleaded not guilty to the charges, but changed his plea to guilty. He was sentenced to 12 months in prison and ordered to pay back $84,777 on June 22, 2020.
