= Sulaiman of Selangor =

Sultan of Selangor (r. 1898–1938)

Sulaiman سليمان
- Sultan of Selangor
- Sultan Alaeddin Sulaiman Shah Ibni Al-Marhum Raja Musa

5th Sultan of Selangor
- Reign: 17 February 1898 – 31 March 1938
- Coronation: 22 October 1903
- Predecessor: Abdul Samad of Selangor
- Successor: Hisamuddin of Selangor
- Born: 11 September 1863; Kuala Selangor, Selangor
- Died: 31 March 1938 (aged 74); Klang, Selangor, Federated Malay States, British Malaya
- Burial: Royal Mausoleum, Klang, Selangor, British Malaya
- Spouse: Tengku Ampuan Paduka Sri Negara Tengku Maharam binti Al-Marhum Tunku Ziauddin (first consort)
- Issue: Tengku Musa Eddin; Tengku Badar Shah; Tengku Alam Shah; Tengku Raihani; Tengku Abdul Aziz Shah; Tengku Ahmad Alham Shah
- House: Opu Daeng Chelak
- Father: Raja Muda Raja Haji Musa Ibni Almarhum Sultan Sir Abdul Samad
- Mother: Raja Buntal Raimah Binti Raja Barakat
- Religion: Sunni Islam

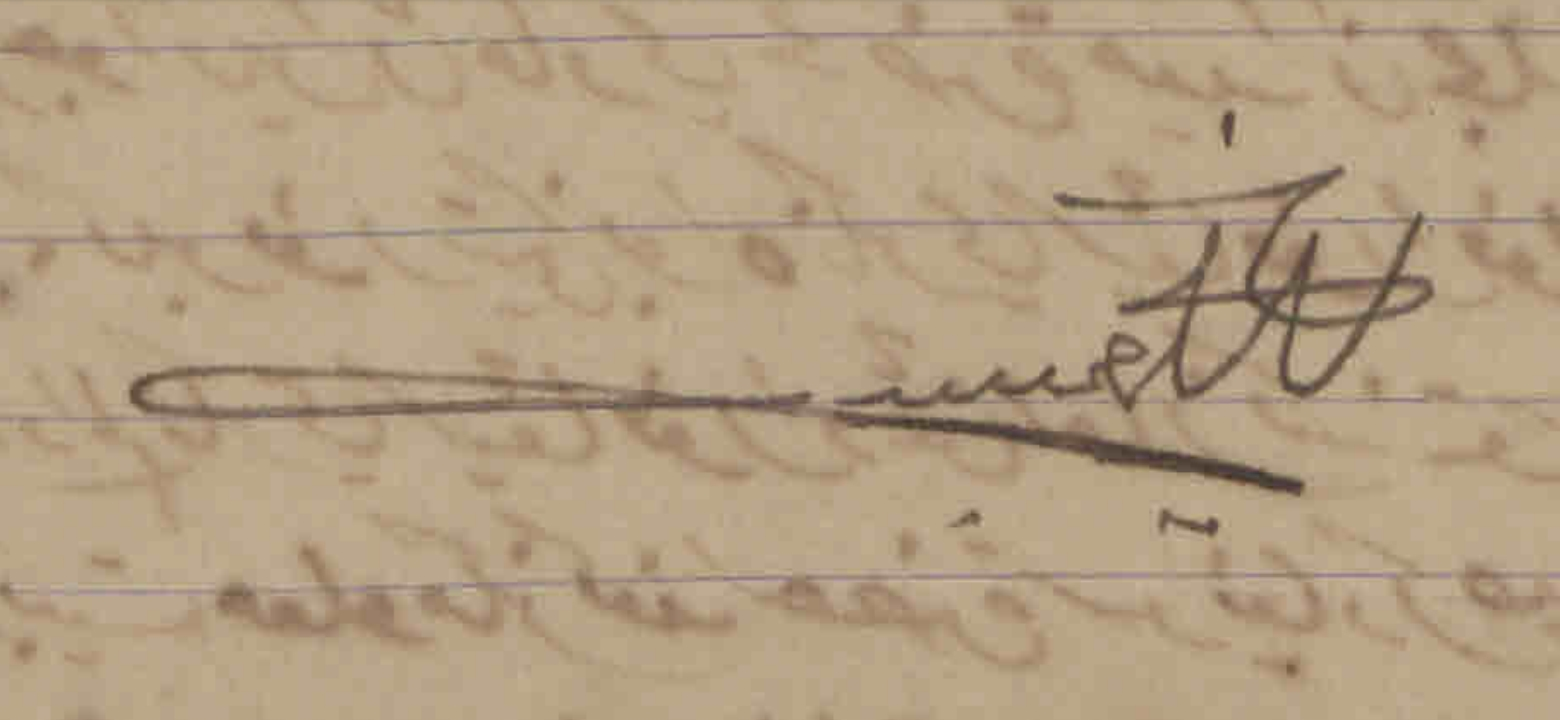
The signature of Sultan Alaeddin Sulaiman Shah

Alaeddin Sulaiman Shah Ibni Almarhum Raja Muda Raja Haji Musa GCMG KCVO (Jawi: سلطان سر علاء الدين سليمان شاه ابن المرحوم راج موسى; 11 September 1863 – 31 March 1938) was the fifth Sultan of Selangor reigning from 1898 to 1938. He was known as Raja Sulaiman before being crowned sultan.

Sultan Sulaiman was appointed a Knight Commander of the Order of St Michael and St George (KCMG) in 1912 and later the Knight Grand Cross of the Order of St Michael and St George (GCMG) in 1929 by the United Kingdom with the title Sir.

Sulaiman's rule was marked by Selangor accession to the Federated Malay States, a federation of four protectorates in the Malay Peninsula, including Perak, Negeri Sembilan and Pahang, established by the British government in 1895, which lasted until 1946.

The Istana Alam Shah was built in 1905 and Sultan Sulaiman resided there until his death in 1938.

== Succession dispute ==
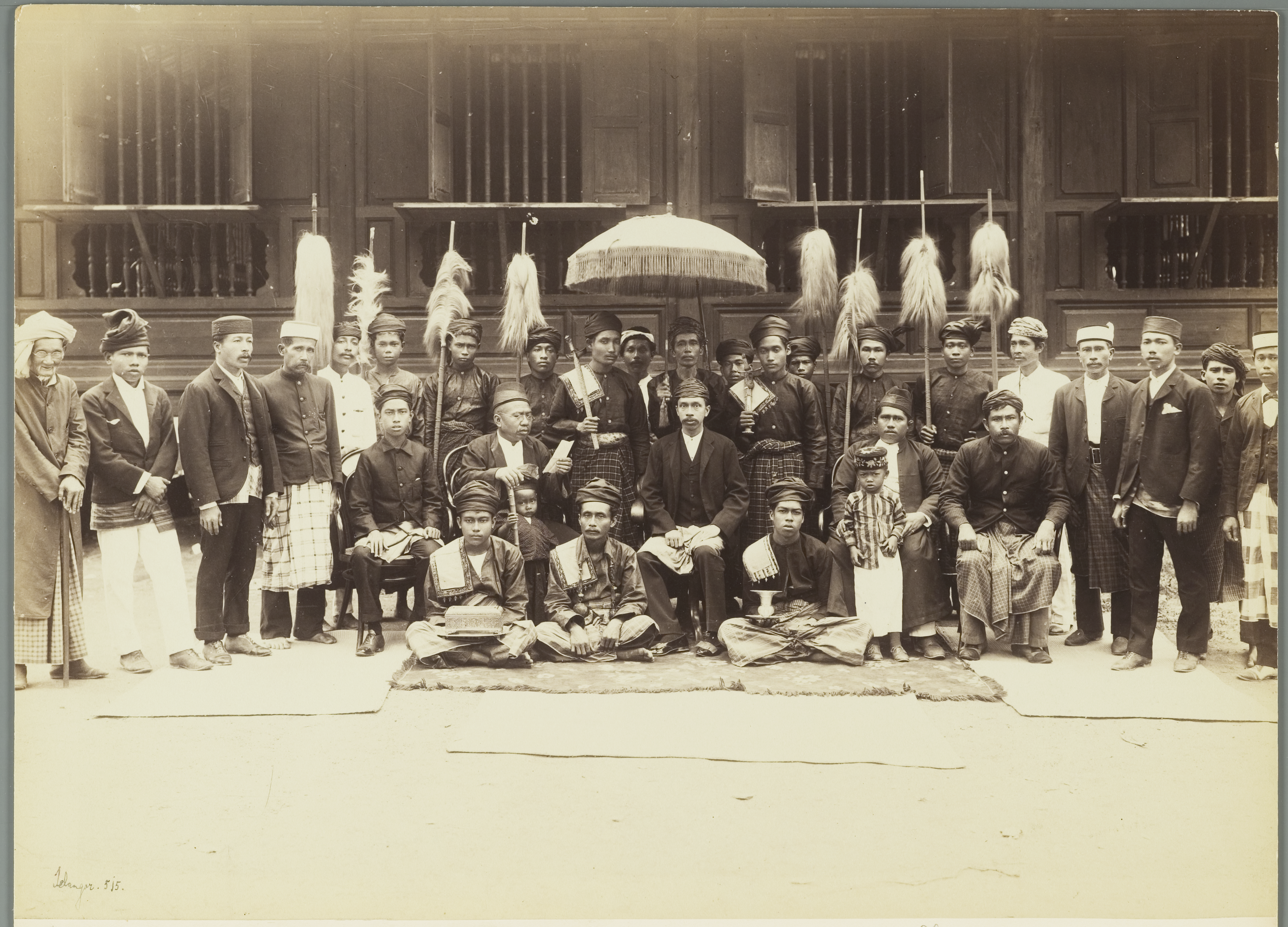
Sultan Alaeddin Sulaiman Shah with his nobles during his coronation day

Sultan Alaeddin Sulaiman Shah had many children, his first three sons were Tengku Musa Heddin, Tengku Badar Shah and Tengku Alam Shah. The first two sons were children by his royal consort, Tengku Ampuan Maharum binti Tengku Dhiauddin of the royal house of Kedah. In 1903, Tengku Musa Eddin had been made Tengku Mahkota and was promoted to raja muda (heir apparent) in 1920.

However, at the instigation of the British Resident, Theodore Samuel Adams (1885–1961; in office 1935–1937), Tengku Musa Eddin was dismissed as raja muda in 1934 for alleged "misbehaviour". Adams had accused Tengku Musa Eddin of being a spendthrift and wastrel with a penchant for gambling. However, many Malays in Selangor believed the real reason for Tengku Musa Eddin's dismissal was his refusal to follow Adams' orders.

Although Sultan Sulaiman pleaded for the case of Tengku Musa Eddin (even petitioning the Secretary of State for the Colonies and discussing the issue directly with him in London), Tengku Alam Shah was instead proclaimed raja muda over his other half-brother Tengku Badar. The appointment occurred on 20 July 1936.

Tengku Alam Shah was proclaimed sultan on 4 April 1938, four days after the death of Sultan Sulaiman. On 26 January 1939, he was crowned at the Istana Mahkota Puri in Klang. Tengku Musa Eddin, then Tengku Kelana Jaya Putera, presided over the ceremony.

== Marriages and issue ==
Sulaiman married eleven times, and had 44 children; 26 sons and 18 daughters.

He first married Tengku Ampuan Paduka Seri Negara Tunku Maharum binti Tunku Ziauddin @ Tengku Kudin of Kedah, his first cousin, on 15 March 1891. She became his royal consort. They had five children together, one son and four daughters. Their four daughters received the title tengku puteri after his coronation on 4 November 1903. Their only son became the seventh Sultan of Selangor. Tengku Ampuan Paduka Seri Negara Tunku Maharum binti Tunku Ziauddin died in 1908 from tuberculosis.

- Tengku Mussa Heddin (1893–1955)
- Tengku Puteri Maheran (1894–1981)
- Tengku Puteri Fatimah (1896–1968)
- Tengku Puteri Arfah (1898–1961)
- Tengku Puteri Zaharah, Tengku Permaisuri Langkat (1899–1982)

He next married Cik Hasnah @ Aminah binti Pilong c. 1895. They had four children, two sons and two daughters. Their second son, Tengku Alam Shah became the sixth Sultan of Selangor, and the second Yang di-Pertuan Agong of Malaysia.

- Tengku Badar Shah, Tengku Bendahara (1893–1945)
- Tengku Badariah (1896–1937)
- Tengku Alam Shah (1898–1960)
- Tengku Salwa, Tengku Puan Panglima Diraja (1901–1972)

He then married his third consort, Cik Sofia binti Abdul Ghani in 1899. They had no children together.

His fourth marriage was to Cik Rogayah binti Muhammad Amin, c. 1908. Their marriage ended with her death in 1909 from childbirth complications. The couple had one son.

- Tengku Abdul Aziz Shah, Tengku Indera Setia Diraja (1909–1922)

He married Cik Chik binti Abdullah c. 1908 (d. 11 June 1949) as his fifth wife. They have seven children, three sons and four daughters. They also adopted a daughter.

- Tengku Khadijah (1909–2001)
- Tengku Ahmad Alham Shah, Tengku Pahlawan Diraja (1911–1991)
- Tengku Muhammad Khalid Shah, Tengku Indera Bijaya Diraja (born 1914)
- Tengku Safiah (born 1923)
- Tengku Mahyun (1924, died in childhood)
- Tengku Yaacob Shah (1925–1959)
- Tengku Aziah (born 1926)
- Cik Uteh Surau binti Abdullah (1927–1977, adopted)

He married Tengku Ampuan Raja Zubaidah binti Abdul Jalil of Perak in May 1910, and she became his second royal consort. She died eight years after the marriage on 17 October 1918 from childbirth complications. The couple had six children, four sons and two daughters.

- Tengku Zainal Karib Shah, Tengku Panglima Besar (1911–1984)
- Tengku Zainal Zainon Rashid Shah, Tengku Seri Paduka Diraja (1913–1989)
- Tengku Nur Ashiha (born 1914)
- Tengku Nur Aishah (1915–1962)
- Tengku Ibrahim Shah, Tengku Seri Wangsa Diraja (born 1916)
- Tengku Idris Shah, Tengku Seri Paduka Shah Bandar (born 1918)

He married for the seventh time c. 1910, to Cik Anjung Negara Maimunah binti Abdullah. They had five children, four sons and a daughter. Their eldest son died in infancy.

- Tengku Ibrahim (Note: Not to be confused with the son of Tengku Ampuan Zubaidah who has the same name)
- Tengku Raihani (1911–1993)
- Tengku Muhammad Uzab Shah, Tengku Perdana Diraja (born 1915)
- Tengku Abdul Halim Shah, Tengku Seri Maharaja Diraja (1918–1985)
- Tengku Mahmud Shah (born 1925)

He married his eighth wife Cik Puri Negara Bidayah binti Ahmad c. 1912. They had five children together, three sons and two daughters.

- Tengku Akram Shah, Tengku Seri Asmara Diraja (born 1913)
- Tengku Zahariah (born 1916)
- Tengku Shaharuddin Shah, Tengku Seri Andika Diraja (born 1918)
- Tengku Muhammad Tahir (born 1923)
- Tengku Shaharul Bariah (born 1924)

In September 1921, he married Tengku Ampuan Paduka Seri Negara Raja Fatimah binti Idris Murshidul Azzam Shah of Perak who became his third royal consort. They had five children, two sons and three daughters.

- Tengku Nur Saadah (1922–2014)
- Tengku Nur Anwar (born 1924)
- Tengku Nur Ashikin Khaladiah (1925–2013)
- Tengku Muhammad Yusuf Shah, Tengku Arif Temenggong (1926–2018)
- Tengku Abdul Rahman Shah (born 1927)

He married Tengku Besar Seri Negara Raja Mariam @ Bulat binti Raja Ahmad c. 1925. They had four sons.

- Tengku Abdul Jalil Shah, Tengku Seri Perkasa (born 1926)
- Tengku Abdul Murad Shah (born 1928) (grandfather of Raja Azura)
- Tengku Abdul Hamid Shah (born 1930)
- Tengku Abdul Samad Shah (born 1933)

He married for the eleventh and last time c. 1933 to Cik Johari binti Abdullah. They had two sons.

- Tengku Harun Shah (born 1934)
- Tengku Azlan Shah (born 1936)

== Legacy ==
Several places have been named after him, including:

- Sulaiman Building, Kuala Lumpur, formerly housing the Syariah Court of Malaysia, presently the Asian International Arbitration Centre
- Sultan Sulaiman Mosque in Klang, Selangor
- Alaeddin Mosque (Jugra, Malaysia)
- Kolej Sultan Alaeddin Suleiman Shah, a residential college at Universiti Putra Malaysia, Serdang, Selangor
- SMK Sultan Sulaiman Shah, a secondary school in Bestari Jaya, Selangor
- Jalan Sultan Sir Alaeddin Suleiman Shah in Shah Alam, Selangor

== Notes ==
Preceded by Sultan Abdul Samad	Sultan of Selangor; 1898-1938	Succeeded by Sultan Hisamuddin Alam Shah
