= Shenton Thomas =

British colonial administrator (1879–1962)

Sir Shenton Thomas GCMG OBE KStJ
- Shenton Thomas, 1936

Governor of the Straits Settlements
- In office 12 September 1945 – 31 March 1946
- Preceded by: Vacant
- Succeeded by: Position abolished
- In office 9 November 1934 – 15 February 1942 (Note: The fall of Singapore and subsequently the Japanese occupation.)
- Preceded by: Sir Cecil Clementi
- Succeeded by: Vacant

Governor of the Gold Coast
- In office 30 November 1932 – 13 May 1934
- Monarch: George V
- Preceded by: Geoffry Northcote (acting)
- Succeeded by: Geoffry Northcote (acting)

Governor of Nyasaland
- In office 7 November 1929 – 22 November 1932
- Preceded by: Sir Hubert Winthrop Young
- Succeeded by: Wilfred Bennett Davidson-Houston

Personal details
- Born: Thomas Shenton Whitelegge Thomas; 10 October 1879 Southwark, London, United Kingdom
- Died: 15 January 1962 (aged 82) Kensington, London, United Kingdom
- Spouse: Lucy Marguerite (Daisy) Montgomery (m. 1912)
- Children: Mary Bridget Thomas (daughter)
- Occupation: Colonial administrator

Sir Thomas Shenton Whitelegge Thomas GCMG, OBE, KStJ (10 October 1879 – 15 January 1962) was a British colonial administrator, best remembered as the Governor of the Straits Settlements at the time of the Japanese invasion during the Second World War.

Born in England, Thomas spent the majority of his early career in the Colonial Service in Africa, rising to become Governor of Nyasaland and of the Gold Coast. He was appointed to the Straits Settlements in 1934, serving as Governor until 1942, when he became a Japanese prisoner-of-war after the fall of Singapore. He served again as Governor of the Straits Settlements after the war, from 1945 until 1946, when the territory was broken up.

== Early life ==
Thomas Shenton Whitelegge Thomas was born on 10 October 1879, in Southwark, London to The Rev Thomas William Thomas and his wife Charlotte Susanna (née Whitelegge) Thomas.

He was educated at St. John's School, Leatherhead and Queens' College, Cambridge. Thomas taught at Aysgarth School in Yorkshire prior to entering the Colonial Service.

== Africa ==
In 1909, Thomas was appointed as Assistant District Commissioner, East Africa Protectorate (Nairobi, Kenya). In 1919, he was appointed Assistant Chief Secretary, Uganda and in 1920 as Chairman of the Uganda Development Commission.

In 1921, he was appointed Principal Assistant Secretary, Nigeria and in 1923, was appointed Deputy Chief Secretary, Nigeria. In 1927, he was appointed Colonial Secretary, Gold Coast Colony (Ghana) before he was appointed Governor of Nyasaland in 1929. In 1932 he was appointed Governor and Commander-in-Chief of the Gold Coast Colony (Ghana).

== Governorship ==
Shenton Thomas

In 1934, Thomas was appointed Governor and Commander-in-Chief of the Straits Settlements and High Commissioner of the Federated Malay States. Montgomery believes that he had been not assigned to the post by any account of capability, but rather to replace Cecil Clementi Smith, who Montgomery deemed "a failure".

Cecil Clementi Smith was practically forced to resign due to his exclusion of the Chinese in Malaysia from educational and agricultural grants which aroused much anger. He also garnered much unpopularity for frequently disregarding Malayan public opinion. Therefore, feelings of anxiety were present in the initial reactions to his designation. West African newspapers denounced Shenton Thomas, characterising him as a harsh and uncompromising autocrat. The Provincial Pioneer, in an issue dated 7 April 1934, stated that: "Malaya was out of the frying pan into the fire." The Malayan press ignored these comments and attempted to promote an unbiased approach.

=== Educational policy ===
The previous governor, Cecil Clementi Smith's educational policy had been much disliked, most of all in non-malay communities, who believed the policy benefited the malays at their expense. The policy laid out in 1932 stipulated that schools which did not teach English or Malay would not receive government funding (excluding schools which were already receiving funding). The new policy also increased school fees, which drew widespread pushback from the legislative and federal council.

In October 1935, Thomas reinstated grants for all schools regardless of the vernacular they taught. In November 1936, he decentralised the education system of the Straits Settlements by allowing the Federated Malay States (FMS) to develop its own syllabus. A Director of Education was also appointed for the FMS.

=== Financial policy ===
In the first years of his governorship, Thomas followed a tight and callous financial policy. He policy of accumulating a sturdy monetary reserve throughout the colony brought continuous years of financial surpluses and was well liked in the British Colonial Office. By 1936 however, this began to diminish his initial popularity as critics believed too much of the people's revenue was being given to the government. The Malay Mail feared that the reserves would be depleted even in the event of "the slightest threat of adversity." The government also gave insufficient reassurance that the reserves would be used well were an economic depression to occur.

In March 1940, Thomas proposed an income tax which was met with widespread criticism. Multiple issues were raised. Many believed it would be difficult to enforce due to the variety of languages spoken in the Straits Settlements. Additionally, the tax would necessitate the creation of a new department and lead to potential corruption. Furthermore, it did not conform to the 4 "canons of taxation", a series of principles introduced by the economist Adam Smith for building a taxation system. Concerns were also raised over the possibility of the tax being used to fund the British home government and the war effort. Thomas announced he would drop it in April and would not attempt to pass it in the Legislative Council, but forced it through a majority vote in the same organ in February 1941. This time, Shenton altered the proposal such that tax revenue would no longer be used to contribute to the British war effort and would be kept in the colony. He reasoned that the new proposal differed from the initial one brought up in 1940 and that thus he was not beholden to his earlier promise. With this argument, council voted 7 to 5 in favour of instituting it. The tax caused much worry to the trading community.

== Prisoner of War ==
Thomas was a prisoner-of-war (POW) during the Japanese occupation of Singapore (15 February 1942 – 15 August 1945) having decided to stay in Singapore during the war. He was imprisoned in Cell 24 of Changi Prison along with missionary Ernest Tipson.

After the war, Thomas remained as the 11th British High Commissioner in Malaya (9 November 1934 – 1 April 1946), until the Malayan Union was established and succeeded the British administration in the Straits Settlements (except for Singapore, which was created as a distinct crown colony), Federated Malay States and Unfederated Malay States, where the post of Governor-General of the Malayan Union was created. Shenton Way, a road in Singapore, was named after him.

== Personal life ==
His brother was Hugh Whitelegge Thomas (1887-1960), a colonial commissioner and Cambridge cricketer. He married Lucy Marguerite (Daisy) Montgomery (1884-1978) daughter of James Montgomery on 11 April 1912 at St Jude's Church, Kensington, London.

Thomas died on 15 January 1962, at his home in London. He was 82.

== Legacy ==
Thomas is widely associated in his role as governor with the loss of Singapore and his civilian administration's apparent failures to properly assess the growing Japanese threat and make appropriate defences. Singapore's capture by the Japanese, in conjunction with other events at the time such as the sinking of Prince of Wales and Repulse, severely undermined British prestige and contributed to the eventual end of colonialism in the region.

During the 1950s, Shenton Way, a road in Singapore's central business district, was named after him as recognition of his decision to remain and become a prisoner of war (POW) at Changi Prison when the Japanese occupied Singapore.

== Gallery ==
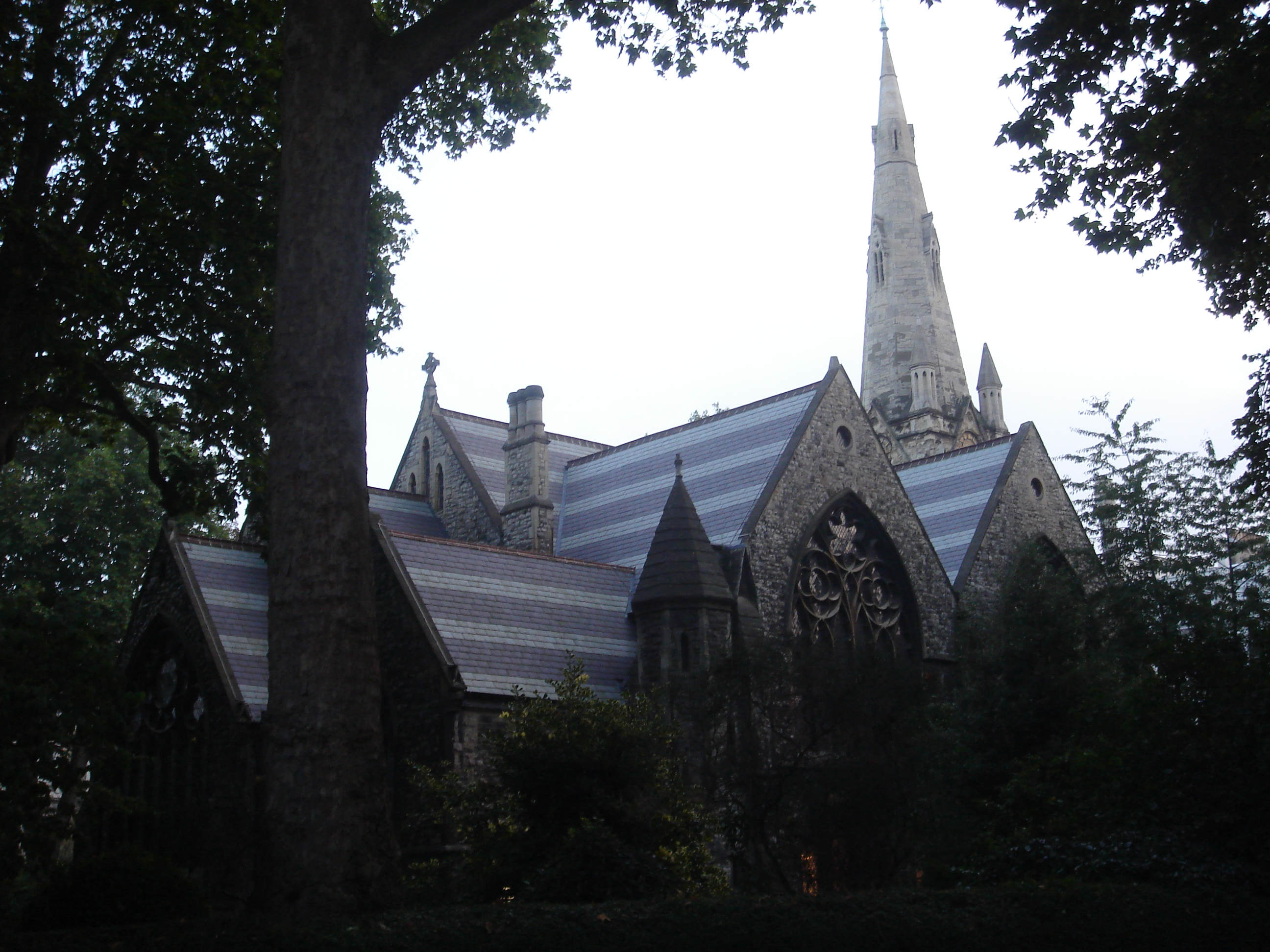
St Jude's Church, Kensington, London, where Thomas married in 1912

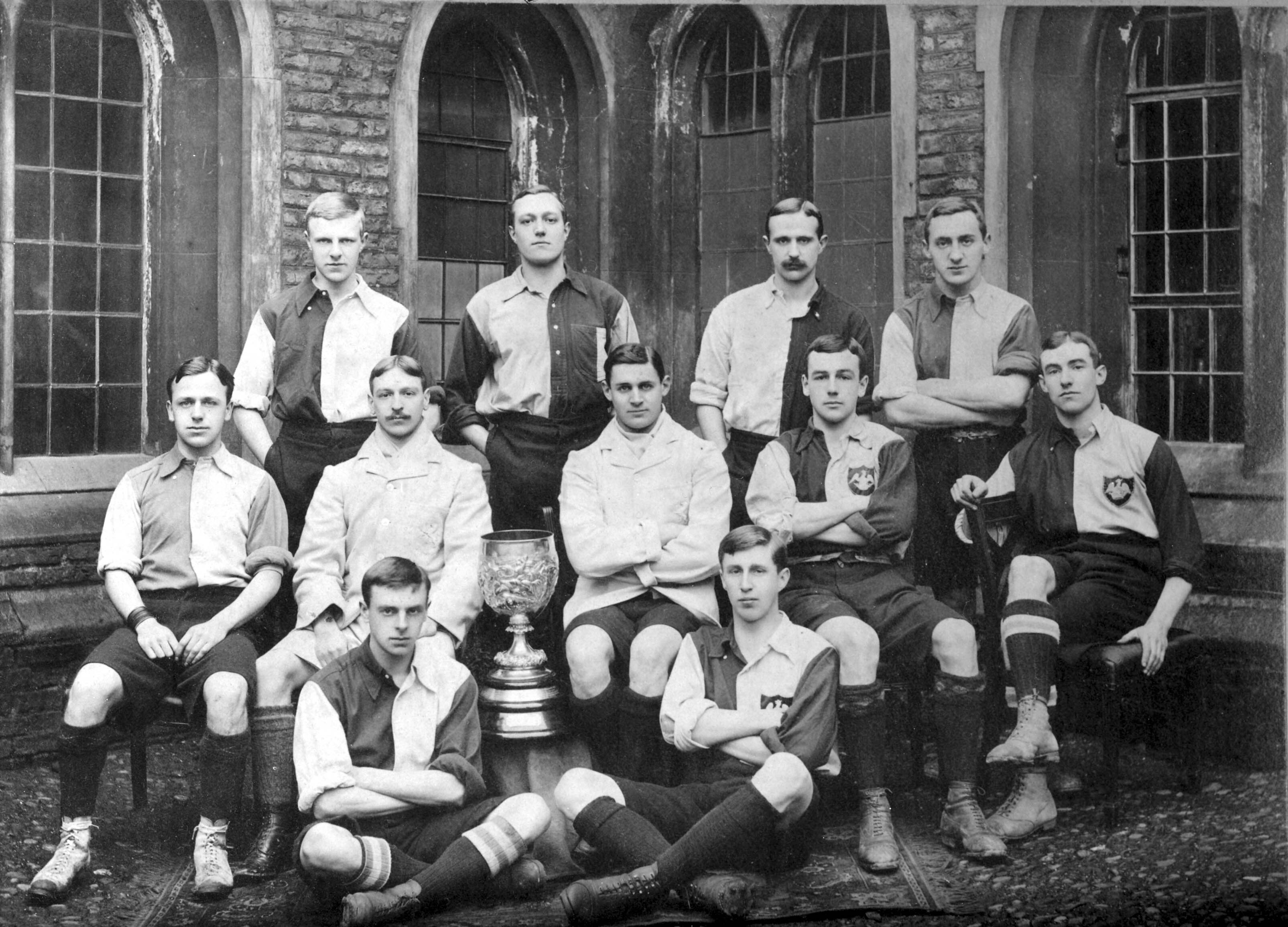
Queens' College, Cambridge football team 1900-1901, including Sir Shenton Thomas (second from right, middle row), Charles Tate Regan and Samuel Day.

== Honours ==
- Officer of the Order of the British Empire (OBE) (1919)
- Companion of the Order of St Michael and St George (CMG) (1929)
- Knight Commander of the Order of St Michael and St George (KCMG) – Sir (1930)
- King George V Silver Jubilee Medal (1935)
- Knight Grand Cross of the Order of St Michael and St George (GCMG) – Sir (1937)
- King George VI Coronation Medal (1937)
- Knight of Grace of the Order of Saint John (KStJ) (1938)

== See also ==
- Elizabeth Choy – Singaporean educator and resistance worker during World War II

== Bibliography ==
=== General histories ===
Turnbull, C. M. (1989). A history of Singapore, 1819-1988 (2nd ed.). Singapore; New York: Oxford University Press. ISBN 978-0-19-588911-6.

=== Biographies ===
Montgomery, Brian Frederick (1984). Shenton of Singapore: Governor and Prisoner of War. Leo Cooper. ISBN 978-0-436-28440-3.

=== Specialised studies ===
Lean, Teoh Chai (1959). The administration of Sir Shenton Thomas (Thesis). University of Malaya.

Government offices
Preceded by Wilfred Bennett Davidson-Houston	Governor of Nyasaland; 1929–1932	Succeeded by Sir Hubert Winthrop Young
Preceded by Geoffry Northcote, acting	Governor of the Gold Coast; 1932–1934	Succeeded by Geoffry Northcote, acting
Preceded by Sir Cecil Clementi	Governor of Straits Settlements & British High Commissioner in Malaya; 1934–1942	Succeeded by Sir Gerard Edward James Gent as Governor of the Malayan Union
Preceded by Sir Cecil Clementi	Governor of Straits Settlements & British High Commissioner in Malaya; 1934–1942	Succeeded by Sir Franklin Charles Gimson as Governor of Singapore
