= 1929 in British Malaya =

- Decades: 1930s; 1940s
- See also: Other events of 1929; History of Malaysia • Timeline • Years

This article lists important figures and events in the public affairs of British Malaya during the year 1929, together with births and deaths of prominent Malayans.

== Incumbent political figures ==
=== Central level ===
- Governor of Federated of Malay States and Unfederated of Malay States, Governor of Straits Settlements: Sir Hugh Clifford

=== State level ===
- Perlis :
  - Raja of Perlis : Syed Alwi Syed Saffi Jamalullail
- Johore :
  - Sultan of Johor : Sultan Ibrahim Al-Masyhur
- Kedah :
  - Sultan of Kedah : Sultan Abdul Hamid Halim Shah
- Kelantan :
  - Sultan of Kelantan : Sultan Ismail
- Terengganu :
  - Sultan of Terengganu : Sultan Sulaiman Badrul Alam Shah
- Selangor :
  - British Residents of Selangor : James Lornie
  - Sultan of Selangor : Sultan Alaeddin Sulaiman
- Penang :
  - Residents-Councillor : Meadows Frost
- Malacca :
  - Residents-Councillor :
    - Bertram Walter Elles (to 6 April)
    - Cecil Harry George Clarke (from 6 April)
- (Negeri Sembilan) Negri Sembilan :
  - British Residents of Negri Sembilan :
    - James William Simmons
  - Yamtuan Besar: Tuanku Muhammad Shah ibni Almarhum Tuanku Antah
- Pahang :
  - British Residents of Pahang : Charles Francis Joseph Green
  - Sultan of Pahang : Sultan Abdullah al-Mu’tasim Billah
- Perak :
  - British Residents of Perak :
    - Henry Wagstaffe Thomson
    - Charles Walter Hamilton Cochrane
  - Sultan of Perak : Iskandar

== Events ==
- 3 June – Ala'Iddin Sulaiman Shah, KCMG, Sultan of Selangor, is designated Honorary Knight Grand Cross by King George V in the 1929 Birthday Honours.
- date unknown – John Archibald Russell begins growing Boh tea in the Cameron Highlands, starting Malaya's tea industry.

== Births ==
- 17 January – Tan Boon Teik, 2nd Attorney-General of Singapore (d. 2012)
- 22 March – P. Ramlee, actor, filmmaker, musician, and composer (d. 1973)
- 25 March – Abdul Hamid Omar, 1st Chief Justice of Malaysia (d. 2009)
- 28 March – Ong Pang Boon, Singaporean politician
- 5 April – David E. L. Choong, badminton player (d. 2011)
- 12 July – Usman Awang, poet, playwright and novelist (d. 2001)
- 25 August – Salleh Abas, judge and politician (d. 2021)
- 18 December – Yeoh Tiong Lay, Malaysian businessman (d. 2017)

== Deaths ==
- 16 November – Haji Abdul Rahman Limbong, Malay ulama (b. 1868)
