= 1925 in British Malaya =

- Decades: 1930s; 1940s
- See also: Other events of 1925; History of Malaysia • Timeline • Years

This article lists important figures and events in the public affairs of British Malaya during the year 1925, together with births and deaths of prominent Malayans.

== Incumbent political figures ==
=== Central level ===
- Governor of Federated Malay States and Unfederated Malay States :
  - Laurence Nunns Guillemard
- Governor of Straits Settlements :
  - Laurence Nunns Guillemard

=== State level ===
- Perlis :
  - Raja of Perlis : Syed Alwi Syed Saffi Jamalullail
- Johore :
  - Sultan of Johor : Sultan Ibrahim Al-Masyhur
- Kedah :
  - Sultan of Kedah : Sultan Abdul Hamid Halim Shah
- Kelantan :
  - Sultan of Kelantan : Sultan Ismail
- Terengganu :
  - Sultan of Terengganu : Sultan Sulaiman Badrul Alam Shah
- Selangor :
  - British Residents of Selangor : Oswald Francis Gerard Stonor
  - Sultan of Selangor : Sultan Alaeddin Sulaiman
- Penang :
  - Residents-Councillor : William Peel
- Malacca :
  - Residents-Councillor : Ralph Scott
- Negri Sembilan :
  - British Residents of Negri Sembilan :
    - Edward Shaw Hose (until unknown date)
    - Ernest Charteris Holford Wolff (from unknown date)
  - Yang di-Pertuan Besar of Negeri Sembilan : Tuanku Muhammad Shah ibni Almarhum Tuanku Antah
- Pahang :
  - British Residents of Pahang : Henry Wagstaffe Thomson
  - Sultan of Pahang : Sultan Abu Bakar
- Perak :
  - British Residents of Perak :
    - Cecil William Chase Parr (until 20 December)
    - Oswald Francis Gerard Stonor (from 20 December)
  - Sultan of Perak : Sultan Abdul Aziz Al-Mutasim Billah Shah Ibni Almarhum Raja Muda Musa I

== Events ==
- 29 June – The Rubber Research Institute of Malaysia is founded.
- July – The British government agrees to suppress the Kuomintang in Malaya.
- Unknown date – Toh Allang Chinese Tin Ltd. is the first all-Chinese limited liability company established in Perak.

== Births ==
- 1 January – Ahmad Koroh, fifth governor of Sabah (died 1978)
- 18 February – Ghafar Baba, former 6th Deputy Prime Minister of Malaysia (died 2006)
- 10 July – Mahathir Mohamad, former 4th and 7th Prime Minister of Malaysia
- 8 August – Aziz Sattar, actor and comedian (died 2014)
  - 22 December - Harun Idris, former 8th Chief Minister of Selangor (died 2003)

== Deaths ==
- 5 September – Lionel Mabbot Woodward, Chief Judicial Commissioner of the Federated Malay States (1920-1925) (born 1864)
