= 1931 in British Malaya =

- Decades: 1930s; 1940s; 1950s
- See also: Other events of 1931; History of Malaysia • Timeline • Years

This article lists important figures and events in the public affairs of British Malaya during the year 1931, together with births and deaths of prominent Malayans.

== Incumbent political figures ==
=== Central level ===
- Governor of Federated of Malay States :
  - Cecil Clementi
- Chief Secretaries to the Government of the FMS :
  - Charles Walter Hamilton Cochrane
- Governor of Straits Settlements :
  - Cecil Clementi

=== State level ===
- Perlis :
  - Raja of Perlis : Syed Alwi Syed Saffi Jamalullail
- Johore :
  - Sultan of Johor : Sultan Ibrahim Al-Masyhur
- Kedah :
  - Sultan of Kedah : Abdul Hamid Halim Shah
- Kelantan :
  - Sultan of Kelantan : Sultan Ismail Sultan Muhammad IV
- (Terengganu) Trengganu :
  - Sultan of Trengganu : Sulaiman Badrul Alam Shah
- Selangor :
  - British Residents of Selangor : James Lornie
  - Sultan of Selangor : Sultan Sir Alaeddin Sulaiman Shah
- Penang :
  - Monarchs : King George V
  - Residents-Councillors :
    - Edward Wilmot Francis Gilman (until unknown date)
    - Percy Tothill Allen (from unknown date)
- Malacca :
  - Monarchs : King George V
  - Residents-Councillors :
- (Negeri Sembilan) Negri Sembilan :
  - British Residents of Negri Sembilan : James William Simmons
  - Yang di-Pertuan Besar of Negri Sembilan : Tuanku Muhammad Shah ibni Almarhum Tuanku Antah
- Pahang :
  - British Residents of Pahang : Hugh Goodwin Russell Leonard
  - Sultan of Pahang : Sultan Abdullah al-Mu'tassim Billah
- Perak :
  - British Residents of Perak : Bertram Walter Elles
  - Sultan of Perak : Sultan Iskandar Shah

== Events ==
- 2 February – St. Anthony's School, Teluk Intan was founded by Rev. Fr. Michel Bonamy.
- Unknown date – Construction began on Masjid Alwi, Perlis.

== Births ==
- 10 January – Nik Abdul Aziz bin Nik Mat _ Politician and Muslim cleric (died 2015)
- 2 August – Sha'ari Tadin, politician (d. 2009)
- Unknown date – Abdullah bin Mohamed – Philosopher
- Unknown date – Shafiee Jaafar – Actor (died 2016)
- Unknown date – Syed Muhammad Naquib al-Attas – Philosopher
- Unknown date – Umi Kalthum – Actress (died 2013)
