= 1930 in British Malaya =

- Decades: 1930s; 1940s; 1950s
- See also: Other events of 1930; History of Malaysia • Timeline • Years

This article lists important figures and events in the public affairs of British Malaya during the year 1930, together with births and deaths of prominent Malayans.

== Incumbent political figures ==
=== Central level ===
- Governor of Federated of Malay States :
  - Hugh Clifford (until 5 February)
  - Cecil Clementi (from 5 February)
- Chief Secretaries to the Government of the FMS :
  - Sir William Peel (until unknown date)
  - Charles Walter Hamilton Cochrane (from unknown date)
- Governor of Straits Settlements :
  - Hugh Clifford (until 20 October)
  - Cecil Clementi (from 5 February)

=== State level ===
- Perlis :
  - Raja of Perlis : Syed Alwi Syed Saffi Jamalullail
- Johore :
  - Sultan of Johor : Sultan Ibrahim Al-Masyhur
- Kedah :
  - Sultan of Kedah : Abdul Hamid Halim Shah
- Kelantan :
  - Sultan of Kelantan : Sultan Ismail Sultan Muhammad IV
- (Terengganu) Trengganu :
  - Sultan of Trengganu : Sulaiman Badrul Alam Shah
- Selangor :
  - British Residents of Selangor : James Lornie
  - Sultan of Selangor : Sultan Sir Alaeddin Sulaiman Shah
- Penang :
  - Monarchs : King George V
  - Residents-Councillors :
    - Captain Meadows Frost (until unknown date)
    - Edward Wilmot Francis Gilman (from unknown date)
- Malacca :
  - Monarchs : King George V
  - Residents-Councillors :
- (Negeri Sembilan) Negri Sembilan :
  - British Residents of Negri Sembilan : James William Simmons
  - Yang di-Pertuan Besar of Negri Sembilan : Tuanku Muhammad Shah ibni Almarhum Tuanku Antah
- Pahang :
  - British Residents of Pahang : C. F. J. Green
  - Sultan of Pahang : Sultan Abdullah al-Mu'tassim Billah
- Perak :
  - British Residents of Perak : Charles Walter Hamilton Cochrane
  - Sultan of Perak : Sultan Iskandar Shah

== Events ==
- 30 April – The Malayan Communist Party was founded and replaced South Seas Communist Party.
- Unknown date – The Lee Rubber Building was completed.

== Births ==
- 15 April – Sakaran Dandai – 8th Yang di-Pertua Negeri of Sabah (1995-2002)
- 29 April – Sultan Mahmud Al-Muktafi Billah Shah – 16th Sultan of Terengganu (died 1998)
- 29 May – Choong Ewe Beng – Badminton player (died 2013)
- 24 August – Sidique Ali Merican, sprinter and sports administrator (died 2009)
- 24 October – Sultan Ahmad Shah Al-Musta’in Billah ibni Almarhum Sultan Abu Bakar – 5th Sultan of Pahang
- Unknown date – A. Rahim – Actor (died 1992)
- Unknown date – A. Wahid – Actor
- Unknown date – Ghazali Sumantri – Actor (died 2001)
- Unknown date – Kamaruddin bin Mohd Isa – Politician (died 1989)
- Unknown date – Sultan Mahmud Al-Muktafi Billah Shah – 16th Sultan of Terengganu (died 1998)

== Deaths ==
- 10 September – Abdul Rahman Andak – 1st State Secretary of Johor (1894-1909)
