= 1932 in British Malaya =

- Decades: 1930s; 1940s; 1950s
- See also: Other events of 1932; History of Malaysia • Timeline • Years

This article lists important figures and events in the public affairs of British Malaya during the year 1932, together with births and deaths of prominent Malayans.

== Incumbent political figures ==
=== Central level ===
- Governor of Federated of Malay States :
  - Cecil Clementi
- Chief Secretaries to the Government of the FMS :
  - Charles Walter Hamilton Cochrane (until unknown date)
  - Andrew Caldecott (from unknown date)
- Governor of Straits Settlements :
  - Cecil Clementi

=== State level ===
- Perlis :
  - Raja of Perlis : Syed Alwi Syed Saffi Jamalullail
- Johore :
  - Sultan of Johor : Sultan Ibrahim Al-Masyhur
- Kedah :
  - Sultan of Kedah : Abdul Hamid Halim Shah
- Kelantan :
  - Sultan of Kelantan : Sultan Ismail Sultan Muhammad IV
- (Terengganu) Trengganu :
  - Sultan of Trengganu : Sulaiman Badrul Alam Shah
- Selangor :
  - British Residents of Selangor : G. E. Cater
  - Sultan of Selangor : Sultan Sir Alaeddin Sulaiman Shah
- Penang :
  - Monarchs : King George V
  - Residents-Councillors : Percy Tothill Allen
- Malacca :
  - Monarchs : King George V
  - Residents-Councillors :
- (Negeri Sembilan) Negri Sembilan :
  - British Residents of Negri Sembilan :
    - James William Simmons (until unknown date)
    - John Whitehouse Ward Hughes (from unknown date)
  - Yang di-Pertuan Besar of Negri Sembilan : Tuanku Muhammad Shah ibni Almarhum Tuanku Antah
- Pahang :
  - British Residents of Pahang : Hugh Goodwin Russell Leonard
  - Sultan of Pahang :
    - Sultan Abdullah al-Mu'tassim Billah (until unknown date)
    - Sultan Abu Bakar (from unknown date)
- Perak :
  - British Residents of Perak :
    - Bertram Walter Elles (until unknown date)
    - G. E. Cater (from unknown date)
  - Sultan of Perak : Sultan Iskandar Shah

== Events ==
- 23 November – Royal Malay Regiment was formed.
- Unknown date – Ho Hong Bank, OCB Bank and CCB Bank merged to form OCBC Bank.

== Births ==
- 2 February – Maria Menado – Actress
- 21 March – Wan Mokhtar Ahmad – Politician (died 2020)
- 8 April – Sultan Iskandar ibni Sultan Ismail – 4th modern Sultan of Johor (died 2010)
- 30 May – Abdul Ghani Gilong – Politician (died 2021)
- 7 November – Tuanku Siti Bainun binti Mohd Ali – 34th Raja Permaisuri of Perak
- Unknown date – Ahmad C – Actor (died 2010)
- Unknown date – Ahmad Daud – Actor (died 2002)
- Unknown date – Ani Arope – Corporate figure (died 2014)
- Unknown date – Ibrahim Pendek – Actor (died 2003)
- Unknown date – Ismail Hussein – Academician
- Unknown date – Kasma Booty – Actress (died 2007)
- Unknown date – Nordin Ahmad – Actor (died 1971)
- Unknown date – Normadiah – Actress (died 2000)
- Unknown date – Osman Zailani – Actor (died 2017)
- Unknown date – Raja Hamidah Raja Saat – Actress (died 2012)
- Unknown date – Rozhan Kuntom – Corporate figure (died 2014)
- Unknown date – Tengku Ahmad Rithauddeen Ismail – Politician
- Unknown date – Zainal Abidin Safarwan – Academician

== Deaths ==
- 1 April – Toh Ah Boon, Chinese community leader and one of the biggest landlords of Johor Bahru (b. 1860).
- 22 June – Abdullah al-Muʽtassim Billah Shah of Pahang, 3rd Sultan of Modern Pahang (b. 1874).
- 26 October – Charles Walter Hamilton Cochrane, colonial administrator (b. 1876).
