= 1933 in British Malaya =

- Decades: 1930s; 1940s; 1950s
- See also: Other events of 1933; History of Malaysia • Timeline • Years

This article lists important figures and events in the public affairs of British Malaya during the year 1933, together with births and deaths of prominent Malayans.

== Incumbent political figures ==
=== Central level ===
- Governor of Federated of Malay States :
  - Cecil Clementi
- Chief Secretaries to the Government of the FMS :
  - Andrew Caldecott
- Governor of Straits Settlements :
  - Cecil Clementi

=== State level ===
- Perlis :
  - Raja of Perlis : Syed Alwi Syed Saffi Jamalullail
- Johore :
  - Sultan of Johor : Sultan Ibrahim Al-Masyhur
- Kedah :
  - Sultan of Kedah : Abdul Hamid Halim Shah
- Kelantan :
  - Sultan of Kelantan : Sultan Ismail Sultan Muhammad IV
- (Terengganu) Trengganu :
  - Sultan of Trengganu : Sulaiman Badrul Alam Shah
- Selangor :
  - British Residents of Selangor :
    - G. E. Cater (until unknown date)
    - George Ernest London (from unknown date)
  - Sultan of Selangor : Sultan Sir Alaeddin Sulaiman Shah
- Penang :
  - Monarchs : King George V
  - Residents-Councillors :
    - Percy Tothill Allen (until unknown date)
    - Arthur Mitchell Goodman (from unknown date)
- Malacca :
  - Monarchs : King George V
  - Residents-Councillors :
- (Negeri Sembilan) Negri Sembilan :
  - British Residents of Negri Sembilan : John Whitehouse Ward Hughes
  - Yang di-Pertuan Besar of Negri Sembilan :
    - Tuanku Muhammad Shah ibni Almarhum Tuanku Antah (until unknown date)
    - Tuanku Abdul Rahman ibni Almarhum Tuanku Muhammad (from unknown date)
- Pahang :
  - British Residents of Pahang : Hugh Goodwin Russell Leonard
  - Sultan of Pahang : Sultan Abu Bakar
- Perak :
  - British Residents of Perak : G. E. Cater
  - Sultan of Perak : Sultan Iskandar Shah

== Events ==
- 23 January – Federal Council of Federated Malay States passed the Malay Regiment Bill to later establish the Experimental Malay Company, Malaysian Army.
- 1 March – The recruitment of 25 males for the First Experimental Malay Company after the passage of Malay Regiment Bill.
- Unknown date – Alwi Mosque was completed and opened by Raja Syed Alwi.
- Unknown date – Football Association of Malaya (FAM) was established, formed from Malayan Football Association (MFA).
- Unknown date – Construction started on Istana Bukit Serene.
- Unknown date – Kulim Rubber Plantations Ltd was incorporated.

== Births ==
- 6 April – Ahmad Nawab – Musician
- 11 June – Rahah Mohamed Noah – Wife to former 2nd Prime Minister, Tun Abdul Razak
- Unknown date – Ali Fiji – Actor (died 1996)
- Unknown date – Hamid Gurkha – Actor
- Unknown date – HM Busra – Actor (died 1981)
- Unknown date – Ismail Hashim – Academician (died 1996)
- Unknown date – Mariam Ismail – Actress (died 2015)
- Unknown date – Shahnon Ahmad – Politician

== Deaths ==
- 10 April – Raja Chulan – Raja Di-Hilir of Perak
- 1 August - Tuanku Muhammad Shah ibni Tuanku Antah – 7th Yang di-Pertuan Besar of Negeri Sembilan
- Unknown date – Mohammad Eunos Abdullah - Nationalist
