= 1927 in British Malaya =

- Decades: 1930s; 1940s
- See also: Other events of 1927; History of Malaysia • Timeline • Years

This article lists important figures and events in the public affairs of British Malaya during the year 1927, together with births and deaths of prominent Malayans.

== Incumbent political figures ==
=== Central level ===
- Governor of Federated of Malay States and Unfederated of Malay States, Governor of Straits Settlements: Laurence Nunns Guillemard (until 3 June); Sir Hugh Clifford (from 3 June)

=== State level ===
- Perlis :
  - Raja of Perlis : Syed Alwi Syed Saffi Jamalullail
- Johore :
  - Sultan of Johor : Sultan Ibrahim Al-Masyhur
- Kedah :
  - Sultan of Kedah : Sultan Abdul Hamid Halim Shah
- Kelantan :
  - Sultan of Kelantan : Sultan Ismail
- Terengganu :
  - Sultan of Terengganu : Sultan Sulaiman Badrul Alam Shah
- Selangor :
  - British Residents of Selangor : Oswald Francis Gerard Stonor
  - Sultan of Selangor : Sultan Alaeddin Sulaiman
- Penang :
  - Residents-Councillor : William Peel
- Malacca :
  - Residents-Councillor : Ralph Scott
- Negri Sembilan :
  - British Residents of Negri Sembilan :
    - Ernest Charteris Holford Wolff
  - Yang di-Pertuan Besar of Negeri Sembilan : Tuanku Muhammad Shah ibni Almarhum Tuanku Antah
- Pahang :
  - British Residents of Pahang : Henry Wagstaffe Thomson
  - Sultan of Pahang : Sultan Abu Bakar
- Perak :
  - British Residents of Perak :
    - Oswald Francis Gerard Stonor (from 20 December)
  - Sultan of Perak : Sultan Abdul Aziz Al-Mutasim Billah Shah Ibni Almarhum Raja Muda Musa I

== Events ==
- June – The Malaya cricket team records its only victory against a visiting Test side, in a game against Australia.

== Births ==
- 19 January – Mohd Sany Abdul Ghaffar, 6th Chief of Defence Forces of Malaysia (died 2015)
- 20 January – Richard Ho Ung Hun, civil servant (died 2008)
- 4 April – Othman Saat, Menteri Besar (Chief Minister) of the state of Johor (died 2007)
- 16 April – Hanafiah Hussain, politician and accountant
- 1 May – Rasammah Bhupalan, independence and social activist (died 2025)
- 15 September – Yuen Yuet Leng, senior police officer (died 2015)
- 28 November – Abdul Halim of Kedah, constitutional monarch (Yang di-Pertuan Agong) of Malaysia from 1970 to 1975 and again from 2011 to 2016, and Sultan of Kedah from 1958 to 2017 (died 2017)
- date unknown – Rosemary Chow Poh Kheng, first female chairman of the Malaysian Chinese Association (MCA) from 1975 to 1985 (died 2023)
- date unknown – Tan Jin Eong, badminton player (died 2014)
