= 1934 in British Malaya =

- Decades: 1930s; 1940s; 1950s
- See also: Other events of 1934; History of Malaysia • Timeline • Years

This article lists important figures and events in the public affairs of British Malaya during the year 1934, together with births and deaths of prominent Malayans.

== Incumbent political figures ==
=== Central level ===
- Governor of Federated of Malay States:
  - Cecil Clementi (until 16 February)
  - Shenton Whitelegge Thomas (from 9 November)
- Chief Secretaries to the Government of the FMS:
  - Andrew Caldecott (until unknown date)
  - Malcolm Bond Shelley (from unknown date)
- Governor of Straits Settlements :
  - Cecil Clementi (until 9 November)
  - Shenton Whitelegge Thomas (from 9 November)

=== State level ===
- Perlis :
  - Raja of Perlis : Syed Alwi Syed Saffi Jamalullail
- Johore :
  - Sultan of Johor : Sultan Ibrahim Al-Masyhur
- Kedah :
  - Sultan of Kedah : Abdul Hamid Halim Shah
- Kelantan :
  - Sultan of Kelantan : Sultan Ismail Sultan Muhammad IV
- (Terengganu) Trengganu :
  - Sultan of Trengganu : Sulaiman Badrul Alam Shah
- Selangor :
  - British Residents of Selangor : George Ernest London
  - Sultan of Selangor : Sultan Sir Alaeddin Sulaiman Shah
- Penang :
  - Monarchs : King George V
  - Residents-Councillors : Arthur Mitchell Goodman
- Malacca :
  - Monarchs : King George V
  - Residents-Councillors : M.W. Millington
- (Negeri Sembilan) Negri Sembilan :
  - British Residents of Negri Sembilan : John Whitehouse Ward Hughes
  - Yang di-Pertuan Besar of Negri Sembilan : Tuanku Abdul Rahman ibni Almarhum Tuanku Muhammad
- Pahang :
  - British Residents of Pahang : Hugh Goodwin Russell Leonard
  - Sultan of Pahang : Sultan Abu Bakar
- Perak :
  - British Residents of Perak : G. E. Cater
  - Sultan of Perak : Sultan Iskandar Shah

== Events ==
- 12 February – Opening of Melaka General Hospital.
- 27 April – Straits Settlement Royal Naval Volunteer Reserve (SSRNVR) was established, predecessor to Royal Malaysian Navy.
- Unknown date – The Public Service Department was founded.

== Births ==
- 22 January – Tunku Abdul Aziz, corporate figure and politician (d. 2023).
- 30 March – J. Y. Pillay, Singaporean civil servant.
- 18 April – Musa Hitam, 5th Deputy Prime Minister of Malaysia.
- 12 May – Syed Nahar Shahabuddin, 5th Menteri Besar of Kedah (d. 1998).
- 13 November – Kamahl, singer and recording artist.

== Deaths ==
- 19 December – Teng Tse-ju, prominent Chinese community leader and tin miner in Negeri Sembilan (b. 1869).
