= Secretariat Building =

Secretariat Building may refer to:

- Secretariat Building, Brunei, Bandar Seri Begawan, Brunei
- Secretariat Building, Chandigarh in India
- Secretariat Building, New Delhi, housing the Cabinet Secretariat of India
- The United Nations Secretariat Building in Manhattan
- Former name of General Treasury Building, Sri Lanka
- Former name of Ministers' Building, Burma
- Kerala Government Secretariat, the secretariat building of the Government of Kerala, India
- Malacca State Secretariat Building, Malaysia
- Mantralaya, Mumbai, the secretariat building of the Government of Maharashtra, India
- Namakkal Kavignar Maligai the secretariat building of the Government of Tamil Nadu, India
- Negeri Sembilan State Secretariat Building, Malaysia
- Patna Secretariat, the secretariat building of the Government of Bihar, India
- Perlis State Secretariat Building, Malaysia
- Sultan Ibrahim Building, former state secretariat building of Johor, Malaysia
- Writers' Building, the secretariat building of the State Government of West Bengal

== See also ==
- Secretariat (disambiguation)
- Central Secretariat (disambiguation)
- Cabinet Secretariat (disambiguation)
