= Government Secretariat (disambiguation) =

Government Secretariat is the administrative headquarters of the Government of Hong Kong.

Government Secretariat may also refer to:

- Kerala Government Secretariat
- Ministers' Building, Burma, previously known as the Government Secretariat

== See also ==
- Secretariat (disambiguation)
