= Imperial Secretariat =

Imperial Secretariat may refer to:

- Imperial Secretariat Service, an administrative civil service of British India
- Zhongshu Sheng, one of the 3 central government departments in imperial China from 620 to 1380
- Mabeyn-i hümayun, the secretariat of the Ottoman sultan

== See also ==
- Secretariat (disambiguation)
- Central Secretariat (disambiguation)
