= GMR Vasavi Diesel Power Plant =

Building in India

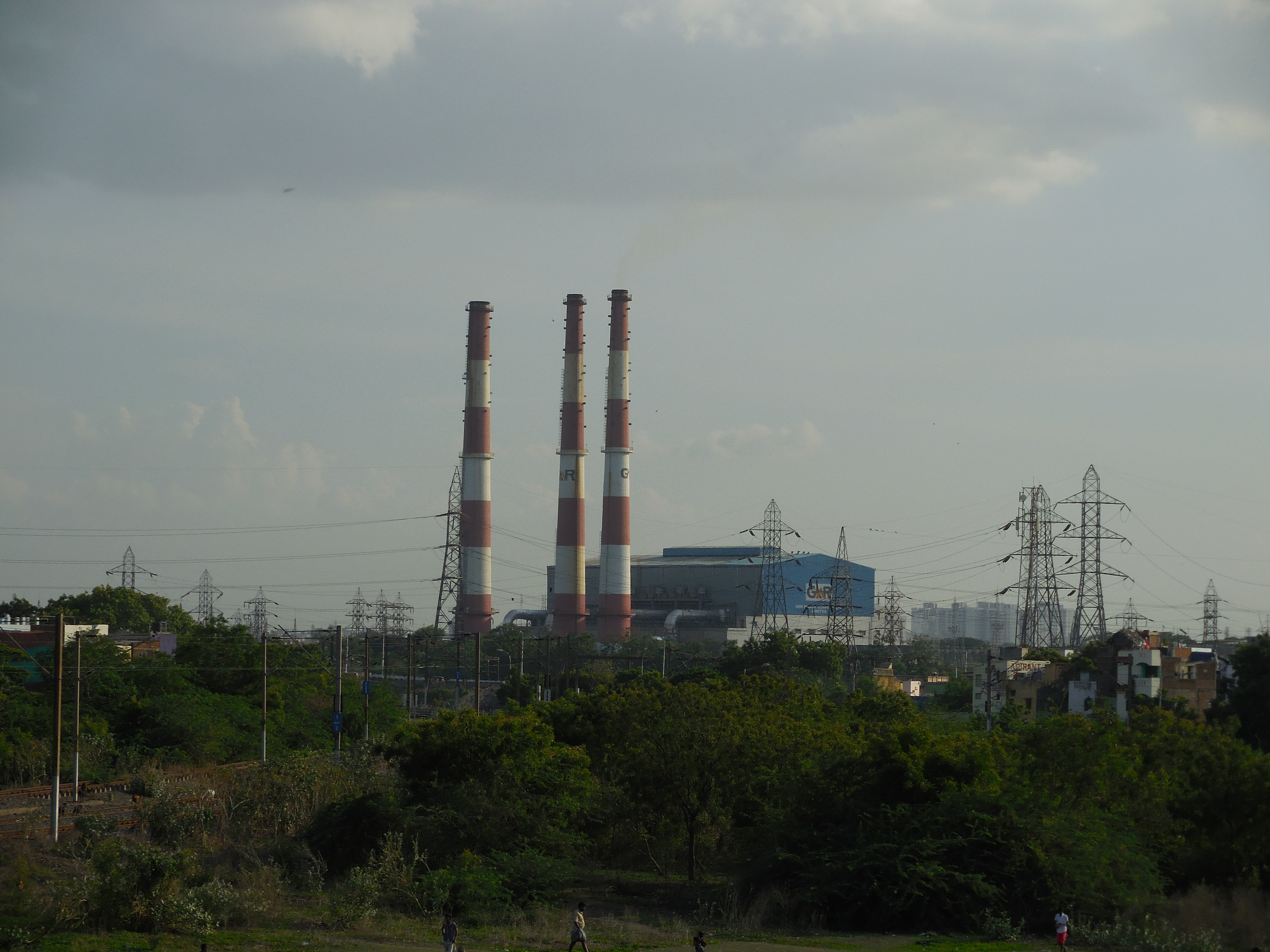
- GMR Vasavi plant as seen from Washermanpet
- Country: India
- Location: 1, Pulianthope High Road, Basin Bridge, Chennai 600 012, Tamil Nadu
- Coordinates: 13°05′54″N 80°16′13″E
- Status: Decommissioned
- Commission date: February 1999 (Phase I)
- Decommission date: 2018
- Owner: GMR Power Corporation Limited
- Operator: GMR Power Corporation Limited

Thermal power station
- Primary fuel: Diesel

Power generation
- Units operational: 4 x 50 MW
- Nameplate capacity: 200 MW; Planned: 320 MW

External links
- Website: www.gmrgroup.in/energy-gmr-power-corporation-ltd.aspx

GMR Vasavi Diesel Power Plant, owned by GMR Power Corporation Limited, was a privately owned power plant located in Basin Bridge, Chennai. It was a 200-MW LSHS (low sulphur heavy stock) fuel-powered plant (processed from the residue of indigenous crude) of the GMR Group. The plant was based on two-stroke diesel engine technology from MAN B&W, Germany. It was the state's first plant commissioned by the private sector. The plant was decommissioned in 2018.

== History ==
The 196-MW liquid fuel-fired power plant was commissioned in 1998 by the GMR Power Corporation on a 29-acre land leased by the Tamil Nadu Generation and Distribution Corporation for 20 years in March 1997. The entire power generated at this plant was supplied to the Tamil Nadu State Electricity Board. It was inaugurated by the then Chief Minister M. Karunanidhi in March 1999. Initially diesel was used as fuel, but the plant later switched to low sulphur heavy stock (LSHS). The Tangedco entered into a 15-year power purchase agreement with the plant. After its expiration in 2014, power purchases continued until February 2015. After this, the agreement was not renewed.

== The plant ==
The plant was built on a 29-acre land and had four units of 49 MW each.

== Conservation ==
To prevent harmful pollutants from escaping into the atmosphere, the plant incorporated reverse osmosis for the final stage of purification. It also had a water conservation plant that processed about 5 percent of Chennai's sewage to produce water required to operate the plant, which was said to be the first of its kind in the country. The plant treated 7,200 cubic meters of raw sewage per day from the Chennai MetroWater Supply and Sewage Board, producing 5,400 cubic meters of clean water for its own use.

== Expansion ==
Phase-I of the project consisting of 4 X 50 MW liquid fuel-based (diesel) power plant was in operation since February 1999. In 2010, the plant planned conversion of Phase I project to a gas-based plant, in addition to initiate Phase II, which consisted of additional 120 MV gas-based combined cycle power plant. The expansion plans required additional land requirement of 2.5 acres, which was within the existing premises.

Natural gas requirement for expansion was estimated at 0.60 million cubic metre per day at standard conditions, to be obtained from Krishna-Godavari basin. Natural gas required for conversion of existing diesel-based plant was estimated at 1.1 million cubic metre per day at standard conditions. About 3.48 MLD of water required for the expansion will be obtained from treated sewage water within the plant premises. An estimated 4.8 MLD of water will be required for conversion.

There was also possibility of switching over the fuel of existing units from heavy oil to pyrolysis oil obtained from bio mass or urban garbage gasification.

These power generation units can be put to use for grid reserve service.

== Significance ==
The power plant remained significant as it catered to the requirements of vital civic utilities such as the Madras High Court, the Government Hospital, Secretariat, Central Railway Station, Egmore Children's Hospital and many important residential areas during emergencies.

== Awards ==
The plant had received ISO 14001 and OHSAS 18001 certifications from Det Norske Veritas. It had also received the Dr. M. S. Swaminathan Award for Environmental Protection for conserving the environment.

== Decommissioning ==
In 2018, the plant was decommissioned owing to high cost, with dismantling of the plant beginning in May 2018.

== See also ==
- List of power stations in India
