= Wilfrid Arthur Ward =

British colonial administrator (1892–1981)

Wilfrid Arthur Ward CMG MC
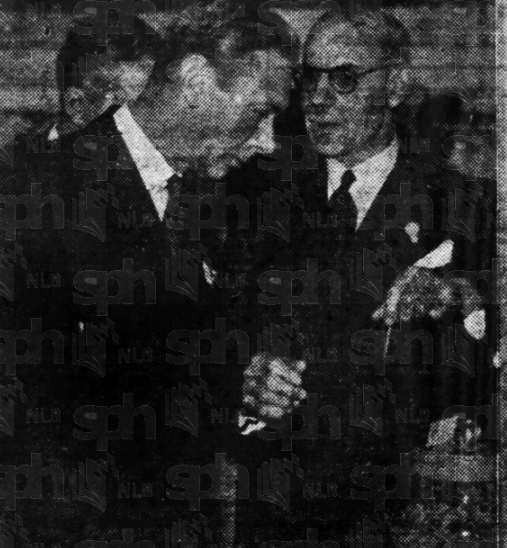
- Ward with King George VI at the British Industries Fair, London in 1950

Resident Commissioner of Selangor
- In office 1946–1948
- Preceded by: George Evans Cameron Wisdom
- Succeeded by: Arthur Louis Birse

Commissioner for Malaya in the United Kingdom
- In office 1948–1953
- Preceded by: Sir Geoffrey Cator
- Succeeded by: Position abolished

Personal details
- Born: 9 May 1892
- Died: 7 May 1981 (aged 88)
- Children: 1
- Occupation: Colonial administrator

Wilfrid Arthur Ward (9 May 1892 – 7 May 1981) was a British colonial administrator. He was Resident Commissioner of Selangor from 1946 to 1948 and Commissioner for Malaya in the United Kingdom from 1948 to 1953.

== Early life and education ==
Ward was born on 9 May 1892, the son of Arthur Henry Ward. He was educated at Christ's Hospital.

== Career ==
Ward joined the Civil Service Rifles on the outbreak of World War I and in 1914 was sent to France. He was commissioned in the Lancashire Fusiliers in 1915, and served in France, Salonika and Palestine. He was promoted to the rank of Captain in 1917, and in the following year was awarded the Military Cross.

Ward joined the Malayan Civil Service as a cadet in 1920 and passed the prescribed civil service examination in 1922. He then proceeded to serve in various posts in the Federated Malay States including in succession:– assistant District Officer, Krian (1923); chief Sanitary Inspector, Penang Municipality (1923); acting Superintendent of Lands, Kelantan (1925); District Officer, Port Dickson (1925); acting District Officer, Batang Padang (1927); District Officer, Temerloh (1929); officer of the Federal Secretariat (1930); assistant Treasurer, Federated Malay States (1930); assistant Secretary to the government of the Federated Malay States (1933); District Officer, Larut (1934); Secretary to Resident, Selangor (1936); Malayan Establishment Officer (1940); Secretary to the High Commissioner (1940); and Under-Secretary, Straits Settlements (1941).

Ward was interned in Singapore during the Japanese occupation from 1942 to 1945. In 1946, he was appointed Resident Commissioner of Selangor, serving until 1948. After leaving Malaya, he returned to England and served in London as the last Commissioner for Malaya to the United Kingdom from 1948 to 1953 when he retired.

== Personal life and death ==
Ward married Norah Anne Phelps in 1922 and they had a son who died aged 9.

Ward died on 7 May 1981, aged 88.

== Honours ==
Ward was awarded the Military Cross (MC) in 1918. He was appointed Companion of the Order of St Michael and St George (CMG) in the 1948 New Year Honours.
