= Geoffrey Cator =

Colonial Administrator

The Honourable Sir Geoffrey Cator CMG
- Cator in c.1939

19th British Resident of Perak
- In office 1933–1939
- Monarchs: George V Edward VIII; George VI
- Preceded by: Bertram Walter Elles
- Succeeded by: Marcus Rex

15th British Resident of Selangor
- In office July 1932 – 1933
- Preceded by: James Lornie
- Succeeded by: George Ernest London

2nd British Resident of Labuan
- In office February 1917 – 1918
- Preceded by: Malcolm McArthur
- Succeeded by: unknown

6th British Resident to Brunei
- In office 1916–1921
- Preceded by: Ernest Barton Maundrell
- Succeeded by: Lucien Allen Arthur

Personal details
- Born: 14 August 1884 Lacock, Wiltshire, England
- Died: 21 April 1973 (aged 88) Hindhead, Surrey, England
- Spouse: Elizabeth Margaret Wynne Mostyn (m. 1922; died 1967)
- Parents: Robert Cator (father); Evelyn Susan Sotheron Estcourt (mother)
- Occupation: Colonial administrator

Sir Geoffrey Edmund Cator CMG (14 August 1884 – 21 April 1973) was a British administrator in the Malayan Civil Service.

== Biography ==
Cator was born in Lacock, Wiltshire, the son of brewer Robert Cator of Bath and Evelyn Susan Sotheron Estcourt. He married Elizabeth Margaret Wynne Mostyn in 1922; they had a son, Peter John Cator (26 October 1924 – 22 January 2006) and daughter Rosemary Ann Cator. Initially assigned to Kuala Kangsar, he held the position of Collector of Land Revenue and frequently participated in football games with the Malay College students, a sport he possessed some skill in.

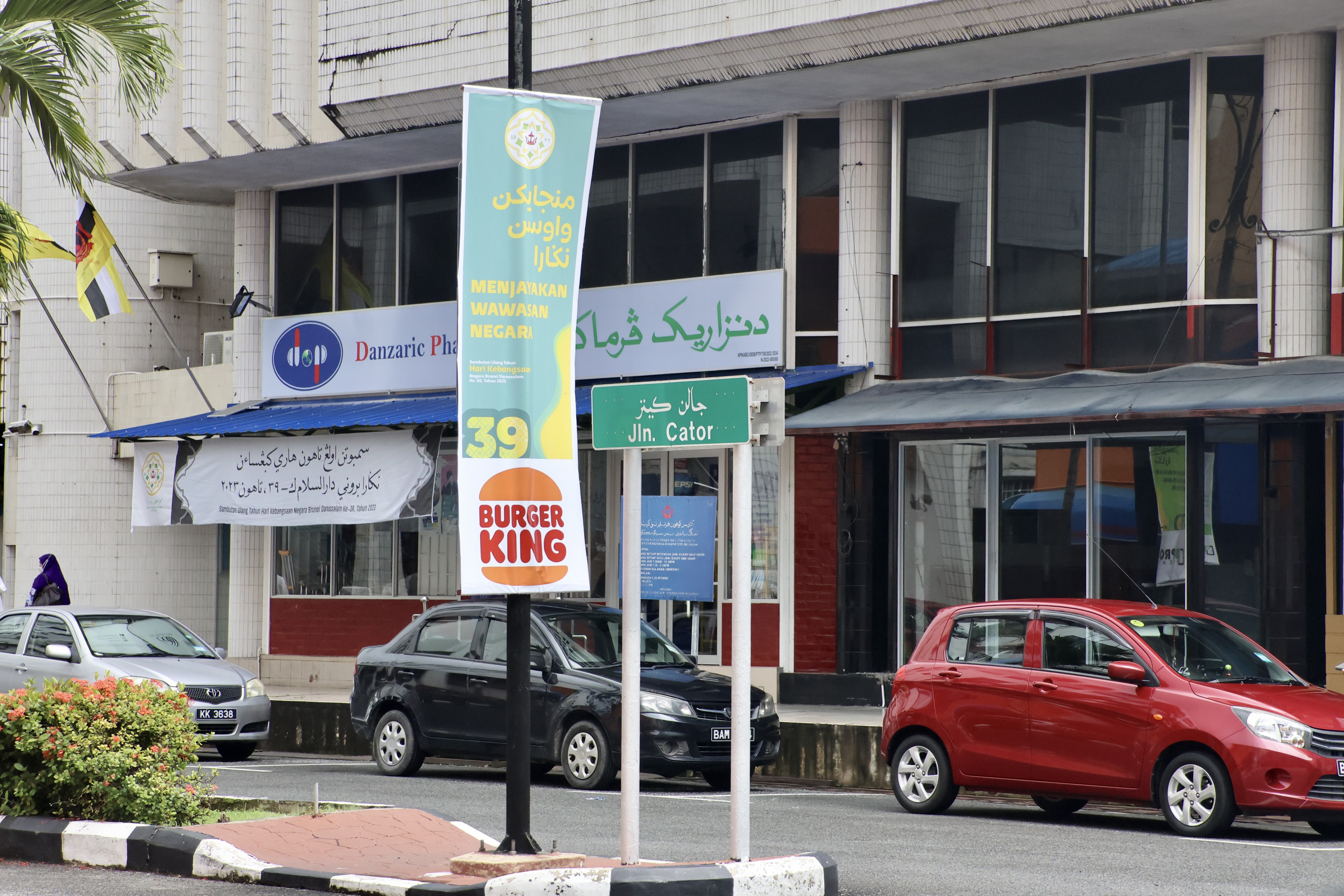
Jalan Cator in Brunei, 2023

Sir Geoffrey joined the Malayan Civil Service in 1907 until 1939. He was the British Resident of Brunei from May 1916 until March 1921. Later he was posted as the Superintendent of Government Monopolies of Straits Settlements, the District Officer of Klang and also member of the Legislative Council of Federated Malay States. He was the British Resident of Selangor (1932-1933) and British Resident of Perak (1933-1939). His last post was the head of the Malay States Information Agency in London. He was made a Knight Bachelor in the 1946 New Year Honours. He had previously been awarded the CMG in 1936.

1948 saw his retirement as a Malayan Agent. One of his responsibilities in that position was to see Sybil Kathigasu in the hospital following the Second World War; he accomplished this duty and did so with his wife, Lizzy. Using modern medicine, especially quinine, to combat malaria was one of his main concerns while he was in Perak. He died in England, 1973.

== Contributions ==
During the World War II, Sir Geoffrey also responsible for planning the war strategy, initially he published some written reviews, when Malaya was ambushed by the Japanese. His publications were,

- "Malaya's war effort", Asiatic Review (1940)
- "Malaya: The first year", Asiatic Review (1940)
- "Course of Japanese invasion of Malaya", Crown Colonist (February 1942)
- "Malaya and the Japanese attack", Asiatic Review (1942)
- "Malaya: a retrospect", Asiatic Review (1942)

== Namesakes ==
- Cator Avenue in Taiping was named after him.
- A street in Pusat Bandar (Bandar Seri Begawan) is named after him, Jalan Cator.

Diplomatic posts
Preceded by Malcolm McArthur	British Resident of Labuan; 1917 – 1918	Unknown
Preceded by James Lornie	British Resident of Selangor; 1932 – 1933	Succeeded by George Ernest London
Preceded by Bertram Walter Elles	British Resident of Perak; 1933 – 1939	Succeeded by Marcus Rex
Preceded by Ernest Barton Maundrell	British Resident to Brunei; 1916–1921	Succeeded by Lucien Allen Arthur
