= Cecil William Chase Parr =

Colonial administrator (1871-1943)

Cecil William Chase Parr CMG OBE

British Resident of Perak
- In office 1921–1926
- Preceded by: William James Parke Hume
- Succeeded by: Oswald Francis Gerard Stonor

British Resident of Pahang
- In office 1917–1921
- Preceded by: Edward John Brewster
- Succeeded by: F. A. S. McClelland (acting)

Governor of North Borneo
- In office 1913–1915
- Preceded by: Frederick William Fraser (acting)
- Succeeded by: Aylmer Cavendish Pearson

Personal details
- Born: 4 December 1871
- Died: 26 May 1943 (aged 71) Seaton, England
- Occupation: Colonial administrator

Cecil William Chase Parr OBE CMG (4 December 1871 – 26 May 1943) was a British colonial administrator.

== Career ==
Parr began his career in 1889, when he entered the civil service of the Federated Malay States as a Junior Officer. He was then appointed to various posts including Acting assistant Protector of Chinese, Kinta (1890), Officer in Charge, Sitiawan (1892), Land Officer, Krian (1892), assistant Collector of Land Revenue, Krian (1893), Acting assistant Magistrate, Gopeng, and assistant Magistrate, Ipoh (1894), acting Collector of Land Revenue, Kinta (1895), assistant Magistrate, Selama, and assistant District Magistrate, Lower Perak and Gopeng (1896), District Officer, Tampin (1899), acting District Officer, New Territories and Lower Perak (1904), acting District Officer, Batang Padang (1906), Acting District Officer, Tapah (1909).

In 1909, he was posted to Kuala Lumpur as acting Commissioner of Trade and Customs of the Federated Malay States, and in 1912 went to England to act as head of the Malay States Agency in London.

In 1913, he was seconded from the Federated Malay States to be governor of North Borneo, and remained in office until 1915. In 1917, he was appointed British Resident of Pahang, and in 1921, assumed the office of British Resident of Perak where he remained until 1926. Shortly after, he and his wife retired to England, and he died in Seaton on 26 May 1943, aged 71.

== Honours ==
Parr was appointed Officer of the Order of the British Empire (OBE) in the 1919 King's Birthday Honours, and was appointed Companion of the Order of St Michael and St George (CMG) in the 1923 King's Birthday Honours.
