= Zainal Abidin III of Terengganu =

Sultan of Terengganu (r. 1881–1918)

Zainal Abidin III زين العابدين ٣
- Sultan of Terengganu
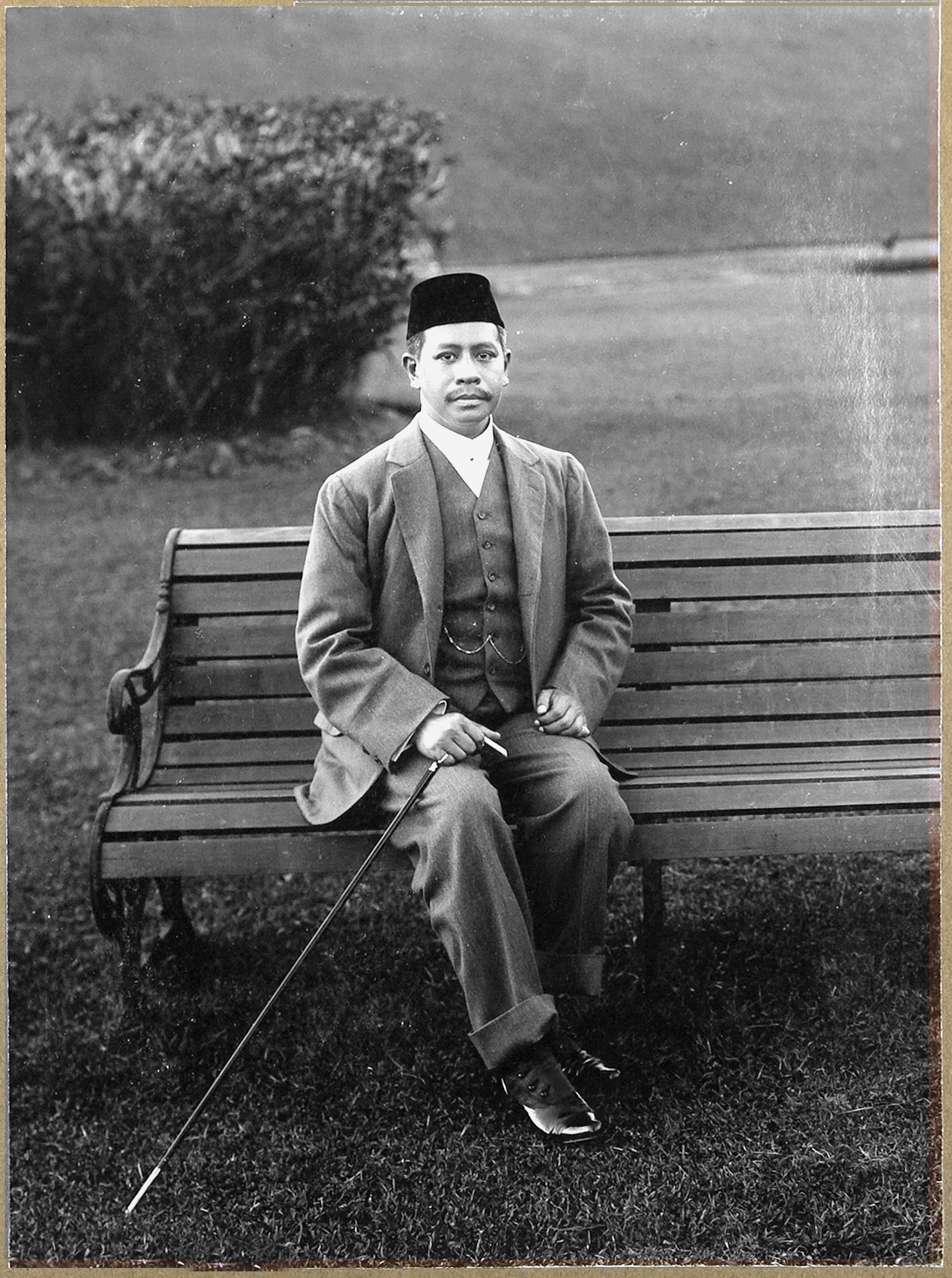
- Zainal Abidin III in 1909

Sultan of Terengganu
- Reign: 19 December 1881– 26 November 1918
- Coronation: 19 December 1881
- Predecessor: Sultan Ahmad Muadzam Shah II
- Successor: Sultan Muhammad Shah II
- Born: 12 April 1866; Kuala Terengganu, Terengganu Town,
- Died: 26 November 1918 (aged 52); Kuala Terengganu, Terengganu, Malaysia
- Issue: Sultan Muhammad Shah II; Sultan Sulaiman Badrul Alam Shah; Sultan Ismail Nasiruddin Shah
- Father: Sultan Ahmad Muadzam Shah II
- Mother: Tengku Kulsum binti Sultan Muhammad Muadzam Shah
- Religion: Sunni Islam

Sultan Zainal Abidin III Muadzam Shah ibni Almarhum Sultan Ahmad Muadzam Shah II, KCMG, (Jawi: سلطان زين العابدين ٣ معظم شاه ابن المرحوم سلطان أحمد معظم شاه ٢; 12 April 1866 – 26 November 1918) was sultan and Yang di-Pertuan Besar of the state of Terengganu from 1881 to 1918. He succeeded his father, Sultan Ahmad on his death. During his reign Terengganu became a British protectorate via the Anglo-Siamese Treaty of 1909. In 1911, Sultan Zainal Abidin III issued Terengganu's first constitution. He died in Kuala Terengganu on 26 November 1918, aged 52, after a nearly 37-year reign and was buried in the Zainal Abidin mosque. He was succeeded by his son, Muhammad Shah II.

== Contribution to Terengganu ==
He reformed the law of Terengganu, which is known as the Itqan al-muluk bi ta'dil al-suluk. He also rearranged the measurement and weighing system. This helped out in their trading as it proved the fairness of the process of trading. He also established Syariah High Court (Mahkamah Syariah) and the police of Terengganu. He also built the Istana Maziah which is the official palace of Terengganu.

== Honours ==
=== Foreign honours ===
- Thailand
  - Knight Grand Cordon of the Order of the White Elephant (April 1887)
  - Knight Grand Cross of the Order of the Crown of Thailand (GCCT) (April 1896)
- United Kingdom
  - Knight Commander of the Order of St Michael and St George (KCMG) – Sir (19 June 1911)

Zainal Abidin III of Terengganu Bendahara dynasty Born: 1866 Died: 1918
Regnal titles
Preceded by Ahmad Muadzam Shah II	Sultan of Terengganu; 19 December 1881– 26 November 1918	Succeeded by Muhammad Shah II
