= William Churchill (colonial administrator) =

British colonial administrator (1898–1963)

William Churchill CMG
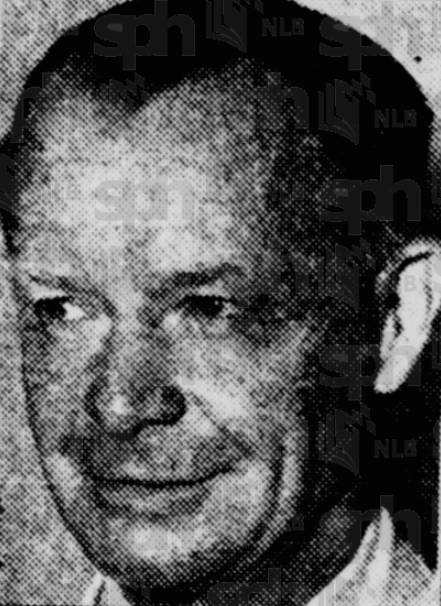

British Resident Commissioner of Kelantan
- In office 1946–1953
- Preceded by: E T Williams
- Succeeded by: A N Ross

Personal details
- Born: 9 April 1898
- Died: 5 July 1963 (aged 65)
- Education: Sidney Sussex College, Cambridge
- Occupation: Colonial administrator

William Foster Norton Churchill (9 April 1898 – 5 July 1963) was a British colonial administrator who was Resident Commissioner of the State of Kelantan, Malayan Union and Federation of Malaya, from 1946 to 1953.

== Early life and education ==
Churchill was born on 9 April 1898, the son of Colonel A. B. N. Churchill. He was educated at Cheltenham College and Sidney Sussex College, Cambridge.

== Career ==
Churchill was on military service during World War I after he was commissioned into the Royal Field Artillery in 1917, aged 19.

In 1921, Churchill joined the Malay civil service as a cadet, and was appointed assistant collector of land revenue at Kuala Lumpur. In the following year, he was appointed magistrate. In 1923, he was posted to Kuala Kangsar as assistant district officer. He then worked at the secretariat in Kuala Lumpur as acting private secretary to Sir George Maxwell, Chief Secretary of the Federated Malay States, and as assistant secretary to the British Resident of Selangor, before he was sent to the state of Terengganu on secondment. From 1927 to 1930, he served as private secretary to the High Commissioner, Sir Hugh Clifford.

In 1930, he was posted to Raub as district officer, and in the following year to a similar position in Upper Perak. In 1933, he was at Taiping as chairman of the Larut and Matang Sanitary Board, and acted as state treasurer of Perak. In 1935, he was appointed district officer of Kuala Lipis, then in the following year returned to the Federal secretariat in Kuala Lumpur as assistant secretary to the government, and in 1940, was appointed to the Selangor State Treasury.

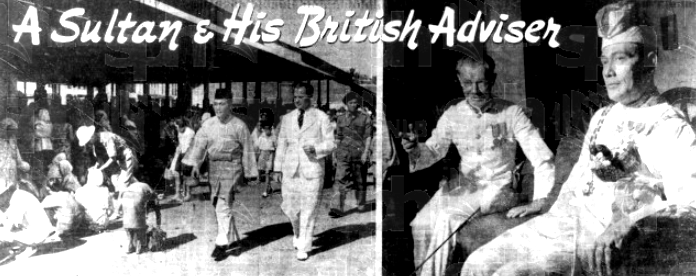
Churchill with the Sultan of Kelantan in 1950

During the Japanese occupation of Malaya Churchill was interned by the Japanese army, and returned to the Malay civil service after the war. In 1946, he was in Kelantan during the turbulent post-war period as British Resident Commissioner succeeding E. Williams, and oversaw the official re-transfer back to British control of Kelantan which, together with Perlis, and Terengganu, had been transferred to Thai control by the Japanese during the war. For his "wisdom and care" in guiding the administration through this uncertain period, he was later awarded the Order of the Crown of Kelantan, 1st Class, by the Sultan of Kelantan. He was succeeded in the post of British adviser, Kelantan, by A. Ross after he retired from the service in 1953.

== Personal life and death ==
Churchill married Ernestine Hallett Bassett in 1954.

Churchill died in England on 5 July 1963, aged 65.

== Honours ==
Churchill was appointed Companion of the Order of St Michael and St George (CMG) in the 1952 Birthday Honours. In 1952, he was awarded the Order of the Crown of Kelantan, 1st Class.
