= Cabinet Secretariat =

Cabinet Secretariat may refer to:

- Cabinet Secretariat (India), department responsible for the administration of the Cabinet of India
- Cabinet Secretariat (Indonesia)
- Cabinet Secretariat (Japan)
- Cabinet Secretariat in the Cabinet Directorate of the devolved Scottish Government in the United Kingdom
- Cabinet Secretariat (Pakistan)
- Secretariat of the Cabinet (Thailand)

== See also ==
- Secretariat (disambiguation)
- Central Secretariat (disambiguation)
- Secretariat Building (disambiguation)
