= Kangar =

Kangar Kangaq (Kedah Malay)
- Town and state capital
- Town of Kangar; Bandar Kangar
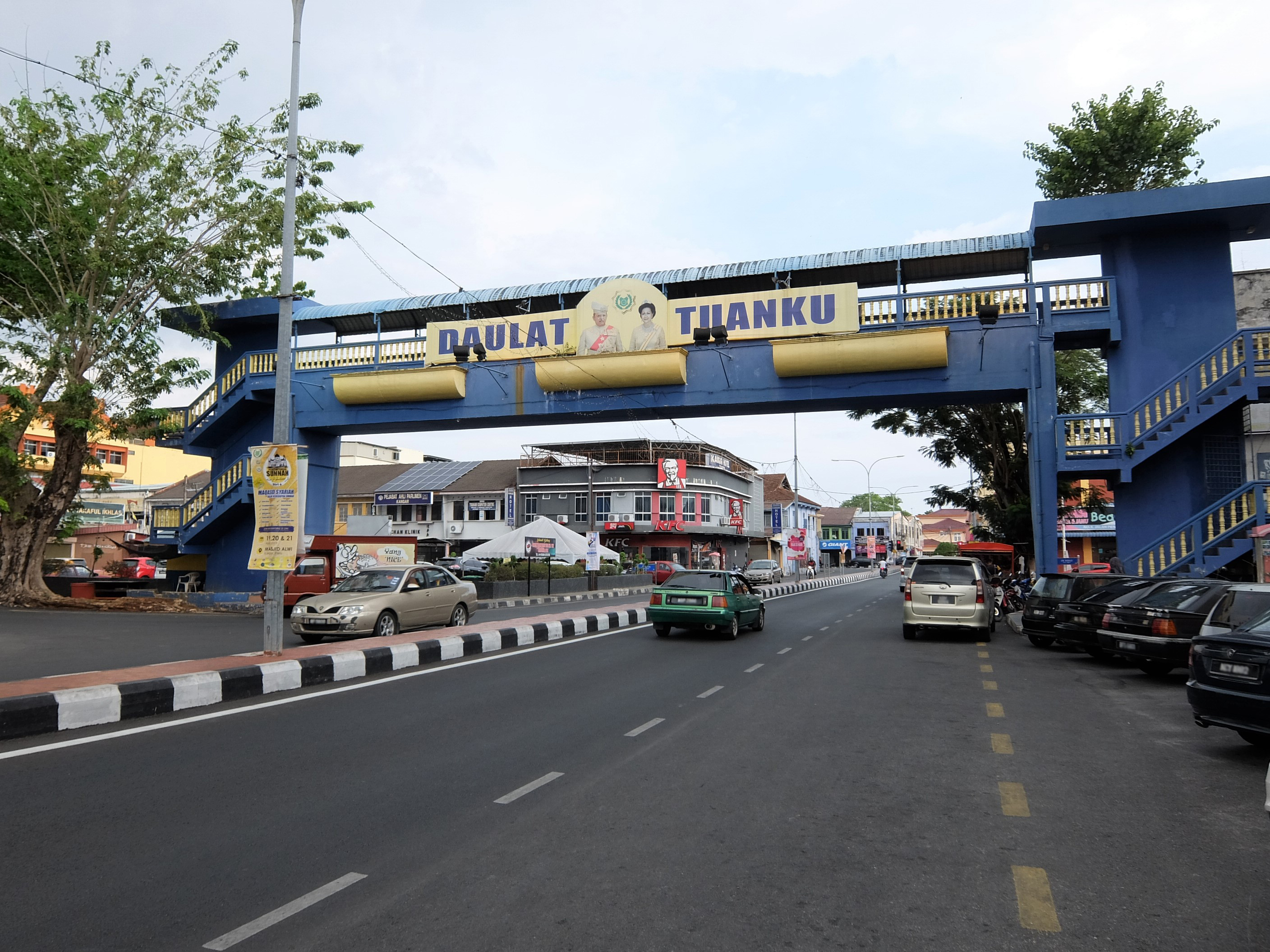
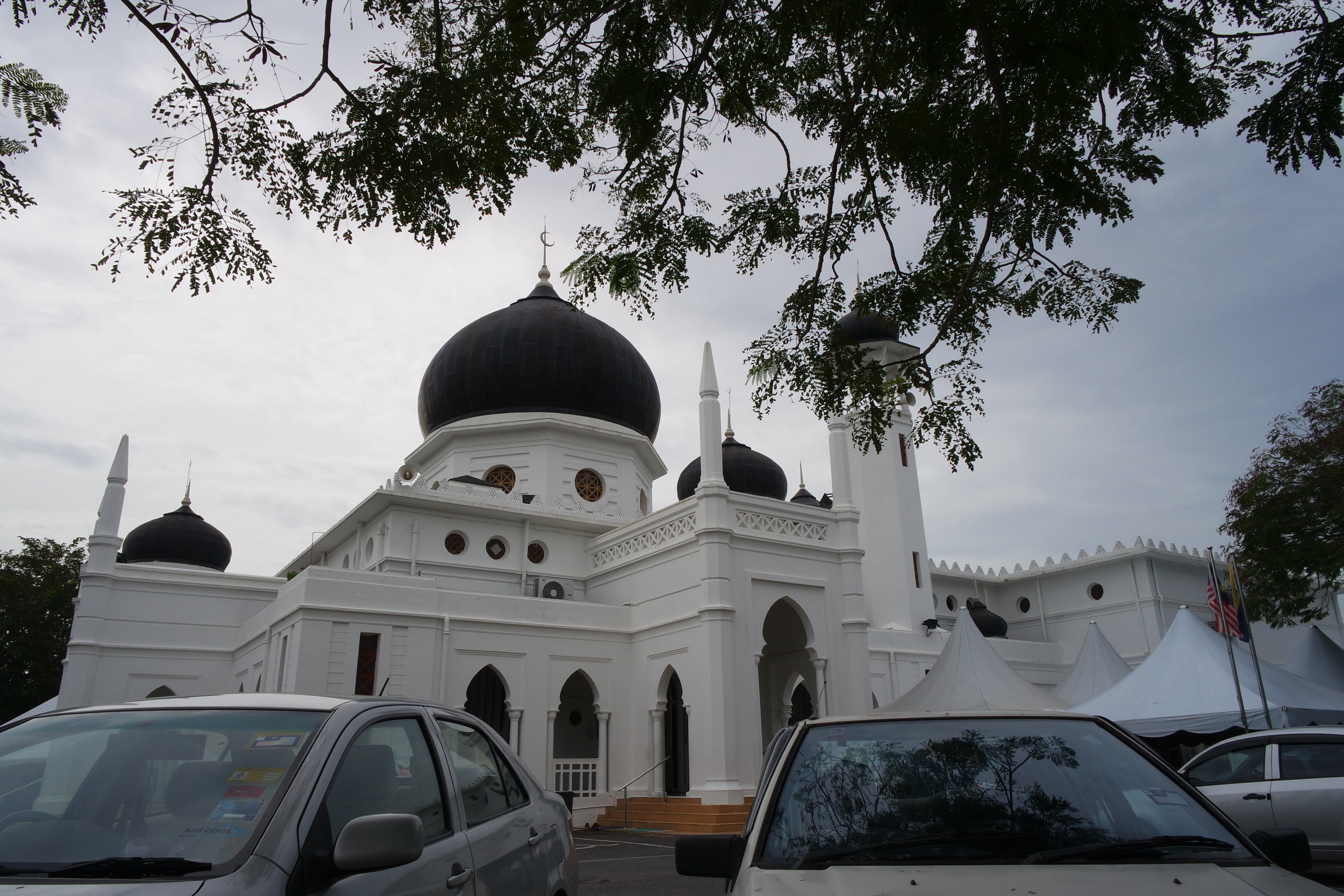
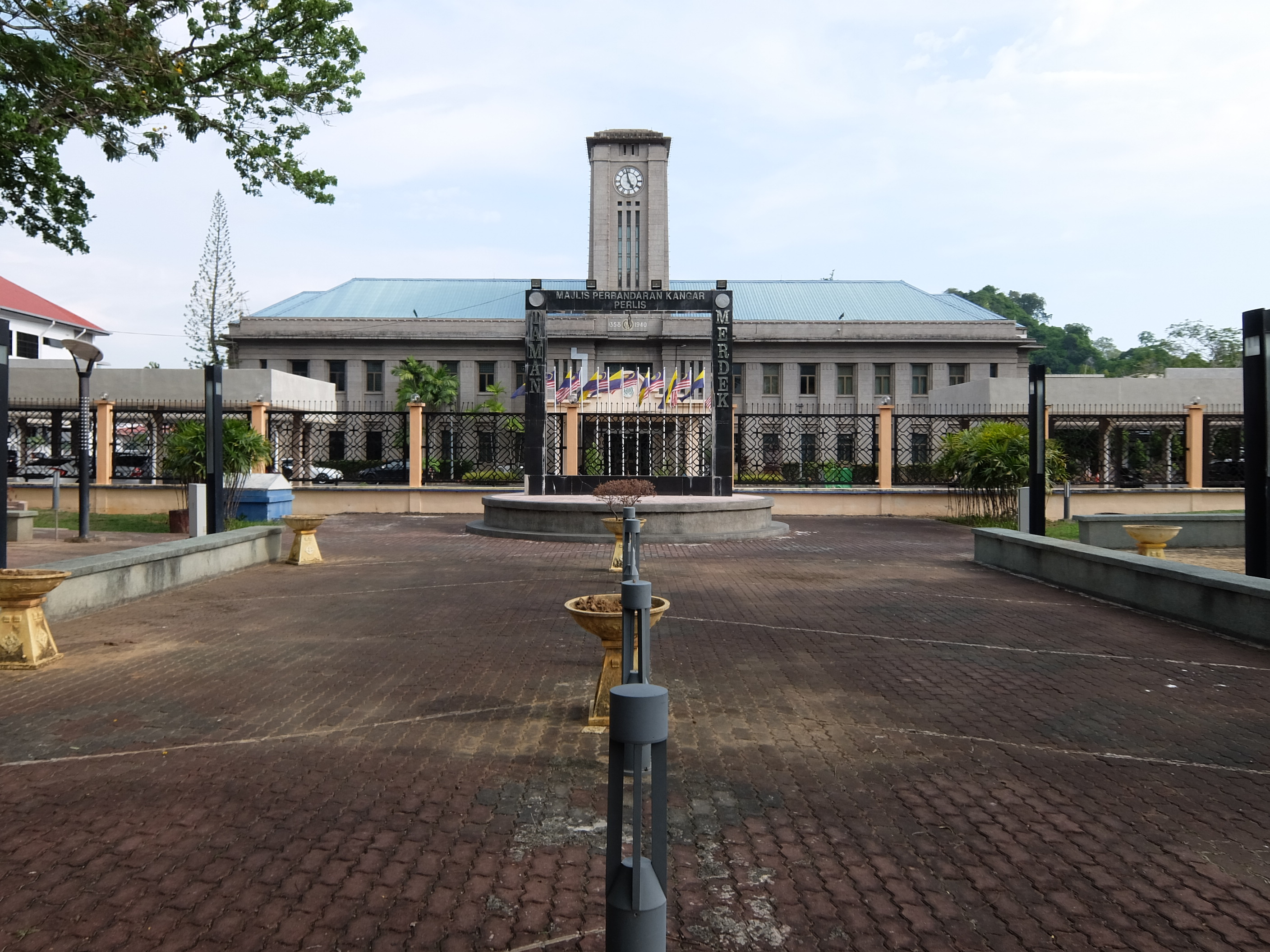
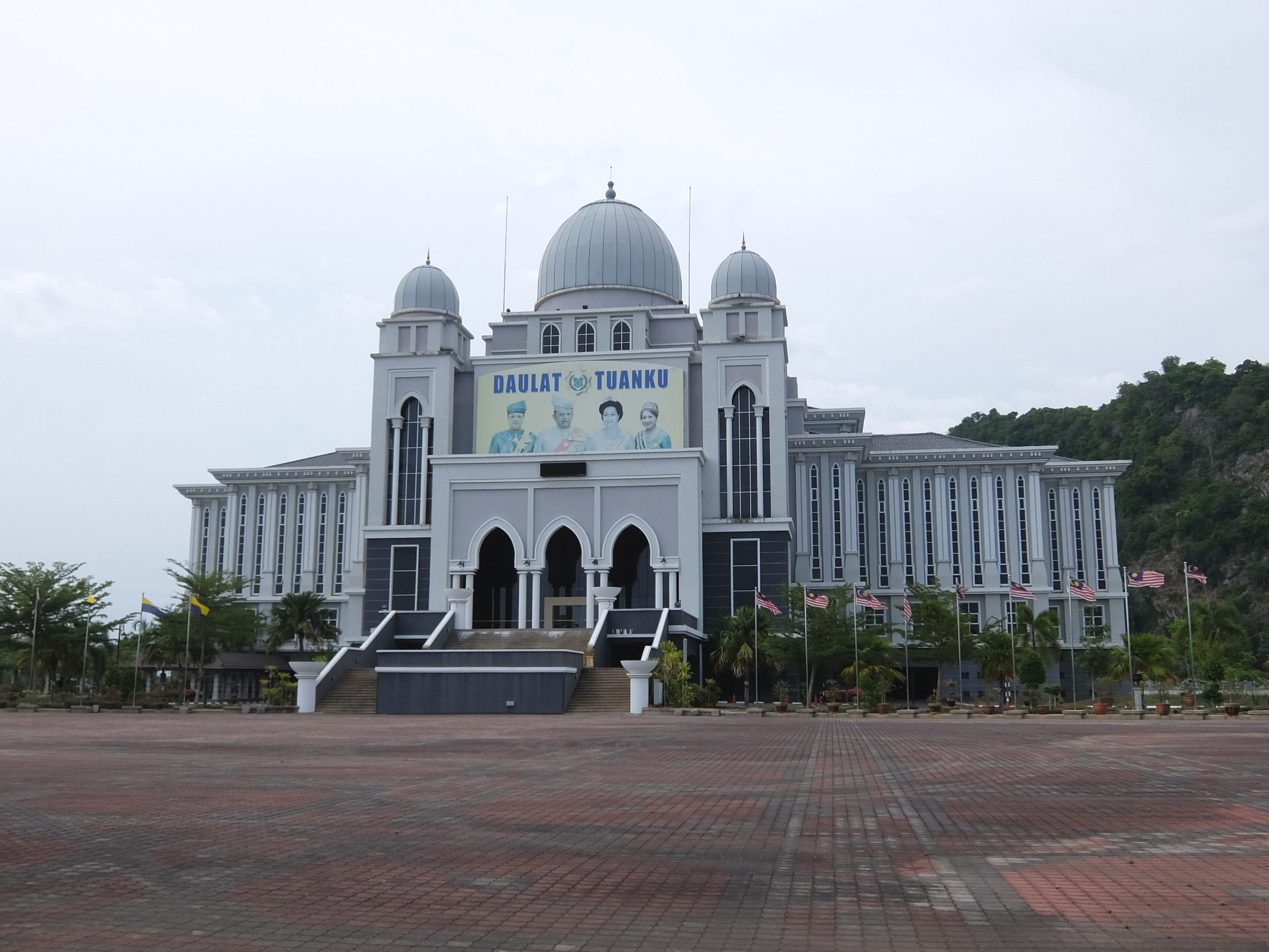
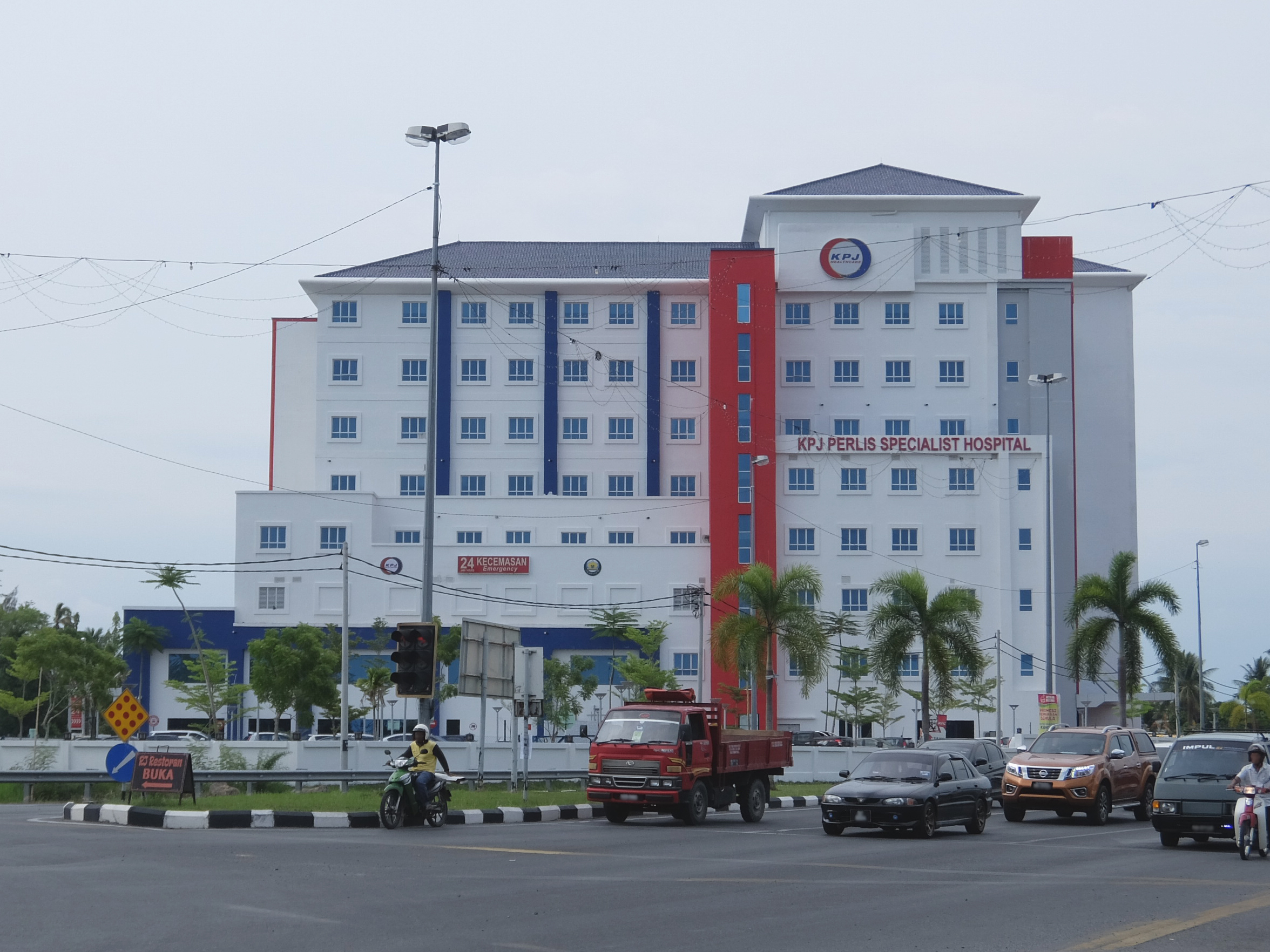
- From top, left to right: Downtown Kangar, Alwi Mosque, Merdeka Square, Perlis State Legislative Assembly, KPJ Perlis Specialist Hospital and the PKENPS Tower @ K-PARC

- Seal
- Interactive map of Kangar
- Kangar in Perlis Kangar (Peninsular Malaysia) Kangar (Malaysia) Kangar (Southeast Asia) Kangar (Asia)
- Coordinates: 6°26′N 100°12′E
- Country: Malaysia
- State: Perlis
- Founded: 6 April 1653; 371 years ago (as Kota Sena)
- Establishment of the town council: 1956
- Municipality status: 1 January 1980

Government
  - Type: Municipal council
  - Body: Kangar Municipal Council
  - President: Norazlan Bin Yahaya

Area
  - Total: 29.84 km^{2} (11.52 sq mi)

Population (2005)
  - Total: 48,898
- Time zone: UTC+8 (MST)
  - Summer (DST): Not observed
- Website: mpkangar.gov.my

Kangar Municipal Council Majlis Perbandaran Kangar مجليس ڤربندرن كڠار

Type
- Type: Local authority

History
- Founded: 1 January 1980

Leadership
- President: Norazlan Yahaya
- Municipal Secretary: Raziff Yaacob

Meeting place
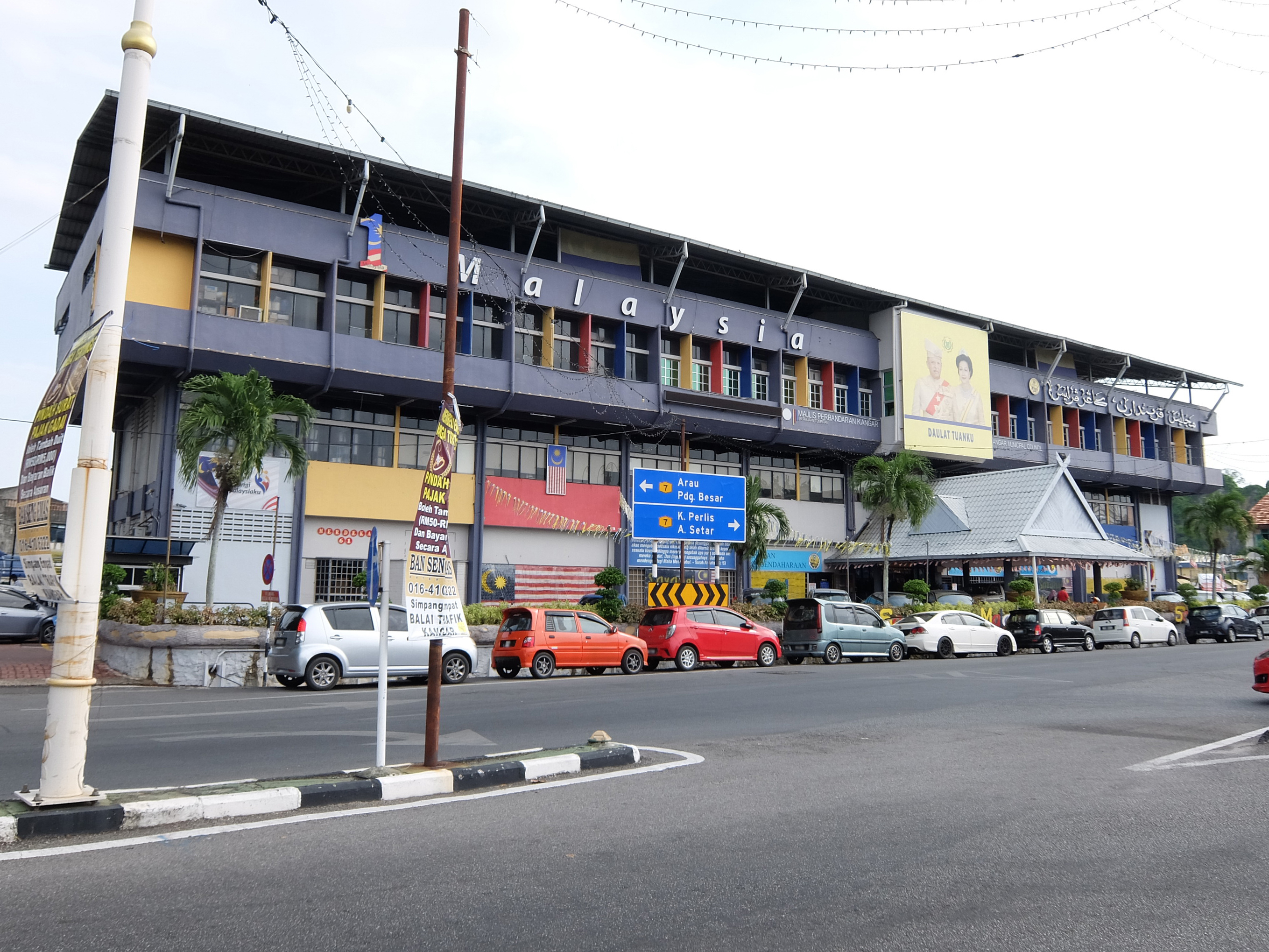
- 192, Persiaran Jubli Emas, 01000 Kangar, Perlis.

Website
- mpkangar.gov.my

Kangar (Kedah Malay: Kangaq) is the state capital and the largest town in Perlis, Malaysia. It has a population of 48,898 and an area of 2,619.4 ha. It is located next to the Thailand border, in the northernmost point of Peninsular Malaysia. It is situated by the Perlis River.

The town is also a gathering centre for the paddy rice production of the surrounding district. Its municipal government is unified with that of the neighbouring communities of Arau and Kaki Bukit. The centre of Kangar is Sena Province. The town is the smallest state capital in Malaysia and its inhabitants are mostly farmers and civil servants. Its industries include cement, saw milling, rubber, paper, and processing of sugar and prawns.

== History ==
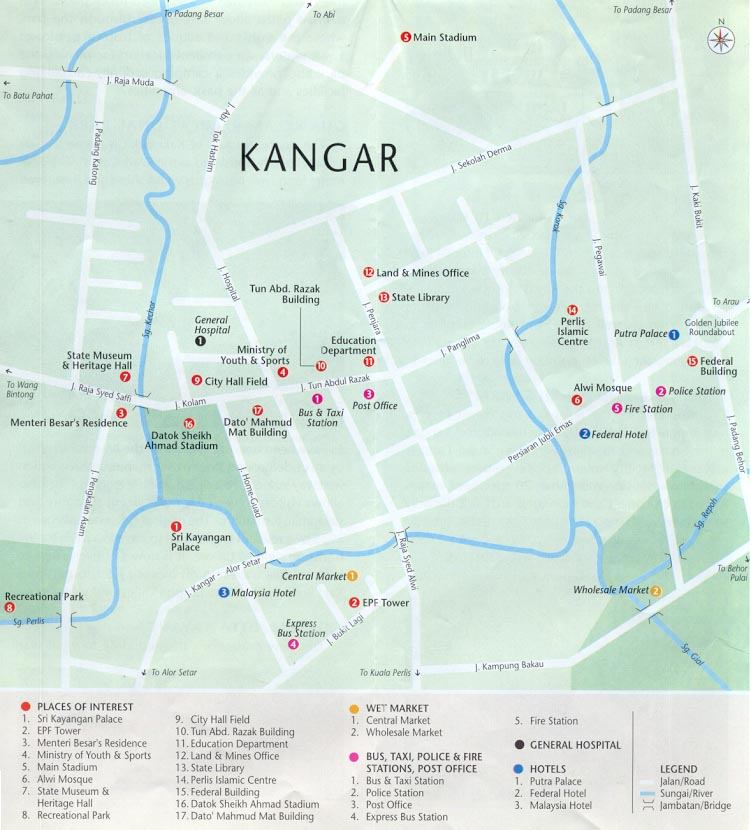
Kangar Map

Kangar existed from about 350 years ago, that is since 1653 when Kota Sena was built as the administrative centre for the 14th Sultan of Kedah, Sultan Muhyiddin Mansor Shah. Kangar was then a land port or pengkalan where boats and tongkangs anchor at the confluence of Perlis River, which runs through Kangar town to Kuala Perlis.

The name Kangar was derived from a type of tree. It was here at the port that trading was done, under a big tree that gave shade and respite to the traders. This tree that became a "witness" to many business deals was called Pohon Kangar. Every trader and merchant who came and went to this place began calling it the Pohon Kangar Port, in honour of the tree.

== Government ==
Kangar Municipal Council is the local government of Kangar Town and the rest of the State of Perlis. It was established on 1 January 1980 through the merger of Kangar Town Council, Padang Besar Town Board and Kaki Bukit and Simpang Empat local councils, all which were established in the mid-1950s. In the beginning, the jurisdiction area of the Kangar municipality was 40 square kilometres. This was increased to 118 square kilometres in 1989 and 795 square kilometres in 1997. As of 2025, 17 people have helmed the council as Presidents, all which were men and four of them were also concurrently Menteri Besar of Perlis at their time in office.

=== Council presidents ===
#	Name of Presidents	Term start	Term end
1.	Jaafar Hassan	1 January 1980	4 March 1981
2.	Ali Ahmad	5 March 1981	31 August 1985
3.	Indrajaya Mahmud Hashim	1 September 1985	31 December 1986
4.	Abdul Hamid Pawanteh	1 January 1987	31 December 1988
5.	Bahari Taib	1 January 1989	27 October 1990
6.	Taib Ismail	28 October 1990	4 April 1995
7.	Shahidan Kassim	5 April 1995	30 June 1995
8.	Johari Mohd Darus	1 July 1995	31 January 1999
9.	Baharuddin Ahmad	1 February 1999	31 October 2003
10.	Musa Hassan	1 November 2003	15 January 2006
11.	Faezan Omar	16 January 2006	15 July 2010
12.	Rosley Mat	16 July 2010	31 December 2013
13.	Ahmad Hussin	3 February 2014	2 February 2016
14.	Khairin Nazry Karim	1 March 2016	16 November 2018
15.	Wan Ahmad Fazli Wan Kamis	1 February 2019	31 January 2021
16.	Norazlan Yahya	27 April 2021	8 May 2024
17.	Affendi Rajini Kanth	9 May 2024	Present

== Demographics ==
Ethnic composition of Kangar (2010)
Ethnicities / Nationality	Percentage
Malay	62.23%
Chinese	30.54%
Indian	4.73%
Other Bumiputras	0.1%
Others	0.3%
Non-Malaysians	2.1%

The majority of Kangar's population speaks Perlis Malay which is a sub-dialect of Kedah Malay but also has its own unique features compared to those of neighbouring Kedah.

The Han Chinese, the second largest community in Kangar are primarily Hokkien speaking, with the language serving as the lingua franca of the city's Chinese population. In addition, significant knowledge of Mandarin and English is also present amongst them.

Other languages spoken in Kangar includes Tamil, Telugu, Malayali as well as Punjabi and Hindi among the Kangar Indian population and Southern Thai by the Kedah-Siamese community.

== Places of interest ==
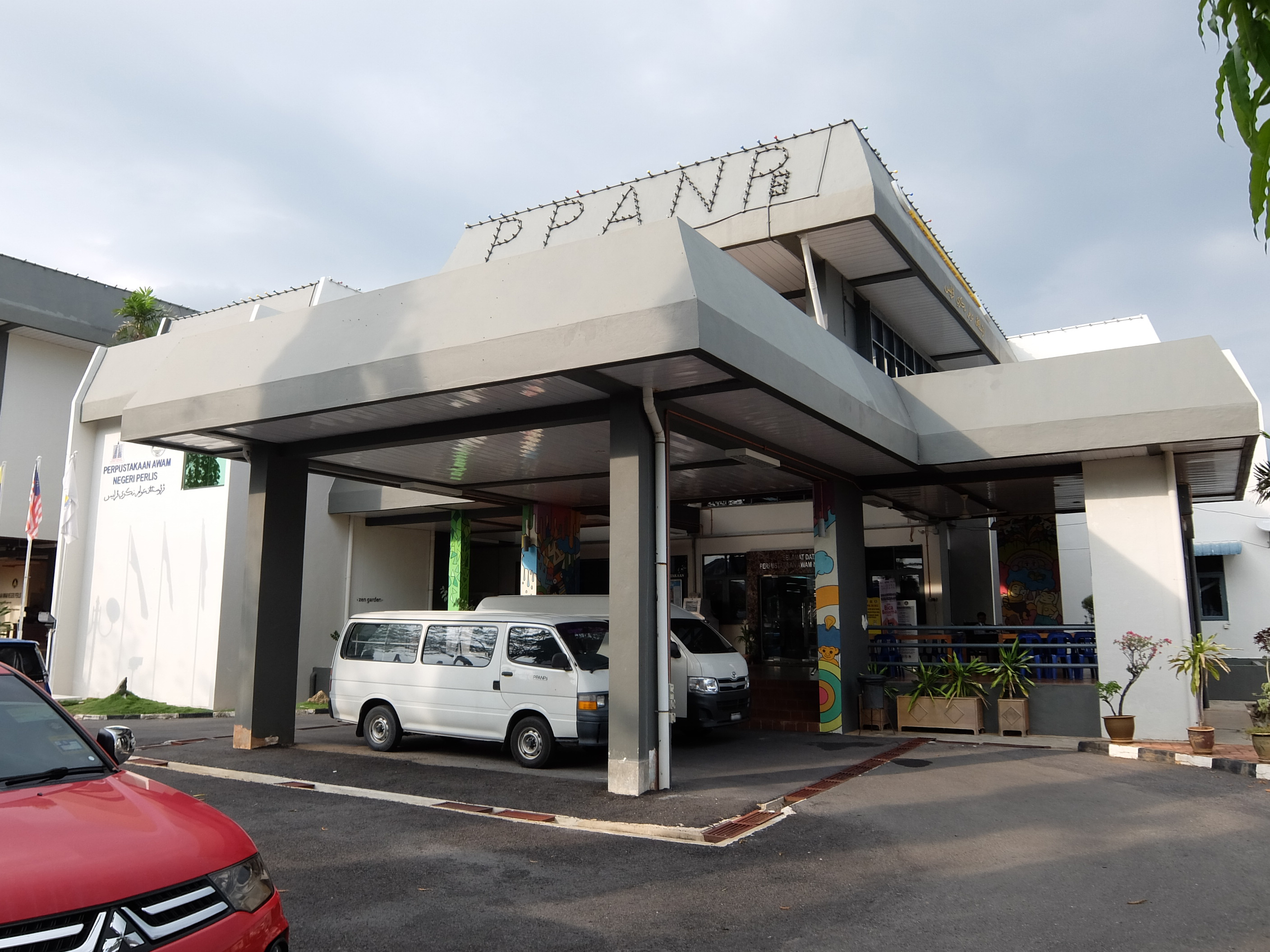
Perlis State Library at Jalan Penjara.

Downtown Kangar is a mixture of old and new shophouses, and has an elegant colonial State Secretariat Building and clocktower from the 1930s. Other major landmarks are:

- PKENPS Tower @ K-PARC Kangar, the tallest building in Perlis
- Dato' Wan Ahmad's House
- Kubu Hill Recreational Park
- Malay World Weaponry Museum
- Medan Mountain
- Perlis Craft Cultural Complex
- State Museum and Heritage Hall
- Alwi Mosque, the former state mosque built in 1910
- Tuanku Syed Putra Stadium
- Gua Kelam, a cave in Kaki Bukit
- Snake Farm of Sungai Batu Pahat
- Bukit Ayer Recreational Park
- Wang Kelian - Next to Thai border
- Padang Besar Shopping Arcade - Duty Free Zone
- Royal Palace of Arau
- Fish Grill Food Court, Kuala Perlis
- Mini Putrajaya - State Assembly Building
- Gua Cenderawasih Park - Look out point
- Perlis State Library (Malay: Perpustakaan Negeri Perlis), main public library of the State of Perlis and the headquarters of the Perlis Public Library Corporation (Malay: Perbadanan Perpustakaan Awam Perlis, abbreviated as PPANP).

== Notable natives ==
- Queenzy Cheng - Late Female Chinese Artist
