= Central Secretariat =

Central Secretariat may refer to:

== China ==
- Secretariat of the Chinese Communist Party
- Zhongshu Sheng, one of the 3 central government departments in imperial China from 620 to 1380

== India ==
- Central Secretariat Service, an administrative civil service of India
- Secretariat Building, New Delhi, former location of the Cabinet Secretariat of India and government ministries
  - Central Secretariat metro station, a Delhi Metro station
- Common Central Secretariat or Kartavya Bhavan, current location of Indian government ministries and departments

== See also ==
- Secretariat (disambiguation)
- Imperial Secretariat (disambiguation)
- Secretariat Building (disambiguation)
- Cabinet Secretariat (disambiguation)
