= William James Parke Hume =

Lieutenant Colonel William James Parke Hume

10th & 13th British Resident of Perak
- In office 1920–1921
- Preceded by: Sir William George Maxwell
- Succeeded by: Sir Cecil William Chase Parr

Personal details
- Born: 25 January 1866; Batticaloa
- Died: 1952 (aged 85–86)
- Spouse: Alice Stevenson

Lieutenant Colonel William James Parke Hume, C.M.G. was born on 25 January 1866, in Batticaloa, Ceylon. He was the son of William Walker Hume (1826-1897) and Henrietta Marion Kelly daughter of Luke Kelly. William married Alice Stevenson in 1903. He died in 1952.

== Malayan Civil Service ==
William Hume was marked as the first Federated Malay States Auditor General to replace the Chief Auditor's post in Audit Office, Kuala Lumpur. He joined the Malayan Civil Service and posted to serve the Malay States in various positions before became the British Resident of Perak; below is the list of offices he held.

1. Collector of Land Revenue, Kinta
2. Secretary to the British Resident of Perak (1906)
3. Auditor General of the Federated Malay States and Straits Settlements (1906-1911)
4. British Resident of Perak (9 August 1912 - 12 August 1912)
5. Commissioner of Trade and Customs (1912 - 1920)
6. British Resident of Perak (29 June 1920 - 13 July 1921)
