= Lionel Mabbot Woodward =

British colonial administrator

Sir Lionel Mabbot Woodward (9 September 1864 – 5 September 1925) was a British colonial judge and administrator, and served as Chief Justice of the Federated Malay States from 1920 to 1925.

== Early life ==
Lionel Mabbot Woodward was born on 9 September 1864. He was educated at Harrow School, where he was head, and Trinity College, Cambridge, where he obtained first class honours in the classical tripos in 1886. After receiving his M.A., he was called to the bar of the Inner Temple.

== Career ==
In 1888, he joined the civil service of the Straits Settlements as a cadet, and was appointed magistrate in Singapore and then Penang. In 1895, he was Deputy Registrar of the Supreme Court and the following year, Official Assignee in Singapore. In 1900, he was appointed Chief District Officer in Province Wellesley, and returned to Penang as Registrar of the Supreme Court in 1902.

In 1904, he was Deputy Public Prosecutor, and in the following year he served as acting Solicitor General of the Straits Settlements and assisted as counsel for the Government of the Straits Settlements in the Tanjong Pagar Dock Company arbitration case.

In 1906, he was appointed a Judicial Commissioner for the Federated Malay States, and in 1915 became a Puisne judge. Four years later, he was appointed Chief Justice, and in 1920, was appointed Chief Judicial Commissioner of the Federated Malay States.

He received the title of knight bachelor in 1922.

Woodward, after being sick for some time, died of a gunshot wound inflicted by himself in the European Hospital, Kuala Lumpur, on 5 September 1925.
