= Sidique Ali Merican =

Personal information
- Nationality: Malaysian
- Born: 24 August 1930 Kota Bharu, Kelantan, British Malaya
- Died: 12 May 2009 (aged 78) Petaling Jaya, Selangor, Malaysia
- Education: Loughborough University
- Occupation: Teacher

Sidique Ali Merican (24 August 1930 – 12 May 2009) was a Malaysian sprinter and sports administrator, who was Malayan sprint champion from 1949 to 1954.

Sidique was born in 1930 at Kota Bharu, Kelantan. Noted for his unusual starting crouch, Sidique clocked 10.3 seconds at his first 100-yard race at an athletics championship in Kota Bharu 1949. Later that year, he broke the Malayan 100 yard record with a 10.0 second time in Singapore, holding the record until 1958, and the title of Malayan sprint champion until 1954. Sidique was educated in the United Kingdom at the Malayan Teachers Training College in Kirkby, Merseyside. He also received a Diploma in Physical Education from Loughborough University in 1955. While studying at Loughborough, Sidique took part in the Inter-Universities Athletics Championship in 1952, clocking a time of 9.8 seconds in the 100-yard dash and 22 seconds in the 200 yards.

He returned to Malaya after receiving his diploma, and began teaching at Sultan Ismail College in Kota Bharu. Sidique briefly returned to sport as a part of the coaching team for the Malaysian athletics squad at the 1960 Summer Olympics in Rome. In 1960 he was made principal of Kuala Krai Primary School, and schools development officer for Kelantan in 1962. In 1972, he was appointed assistant sports director at the Culture, Youth and Sports Ministry, and was promoted to director-general in 1981, before retiring in 1985. From 1974 to 1986, he was honorary secretary of the Olympic Council of Malaysia, and was admitted to the OCM's Hall of Fame in 2002. As a sports administrator, he was the organising secretary of the 1977 Southeast Asian Games in Kuala Lumpur. He acted as deputy chef de mission for the Malaysian team at the 1978 Commonwealth Games in Edmonton and the 1982 Asian Games in Delhi, and chef de mission at the 1984 Summer Olympics in Los Angeles.

Sidique died on 12 May 2009, aged 78, after suffering a stroke at his home in Petaling Jaya.
