= Perlis State Secretariat Building =

Perlis State Secretriat Building is Perlis's state secretariat building. It is situated on Jalan Hospital, Kangar.

== History ==
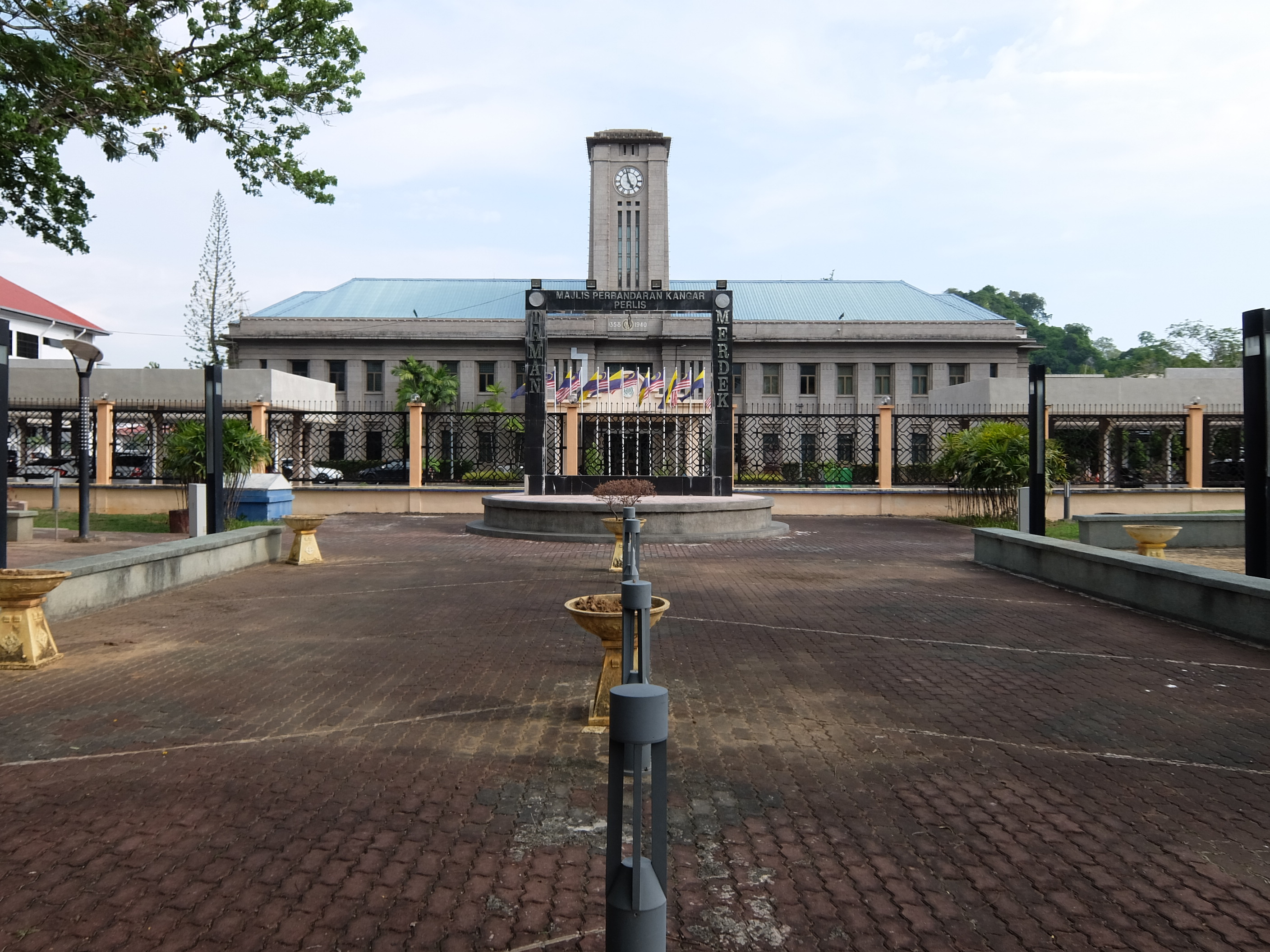
State Government Offices, Merdeka Park, Kangar, Perlis, completed in 1939 as government offices for the British authorities.

The building was erected as government offices for the British authorities, and included various departments including: the British Adviser's Office, the Council Chamber, the Treasury, the Customs, the Land Office, the Education Office, the Sanitary Board, and the Health Office.

The foundation stone was laid by the Raja of Perlis in 1937 and the building was completed in 1939. The cost of the building was $87,000 and was designed by a Mr. Boucher, architect, Boucher & Co., Penang. The building contractor was Lee Woon of Penang, supervised by D. Cheam of Kangar. The clock was made by William Potts & Sons, Leeds.

== See also ==
- State governments in Malaysia
