= Namakkal Kavignar Maligai =

- Interactive map of the Namakkal Kavignar Maligai area

General information
- Type: Government offices
- Location: Fort St. George, Chennai, India, Fort St. George, Chennai, Tamil Nadu 600 009, India
- Coordinates: 13°04′52″N 80°17′12″E
- Inaugurated: 1975
- Owner: Government of Tamil Nadu

Technical details
- Floor count: 11

Namakkal Kavignar Maligai is an 11-storied building at the Fort St. George campus in Chennai, India, serving as the power centre of state secretariat of Tamil Nadu. It is the only skyscraper built within the Fort campus. As of 2014, there were about 6,000 staff at the secretariat.

== History ==
The fort was built by the British rulers in 1640. After Independence, the entire complex was taken over by the Department of Defense. The state secretariat started functioning in the fort complex. The fort building is a three-storied one housing the offices of the chief minister and other ministers, the chief secretary, home ministry, treasury, etc. To accommodate the remaining offices, the then ruling DMK government planned to build a 10-storied building adjacent to the fort building. The building was built in 1975 and was named Namakkal Kavignar Maligai in the memory of Venkatarama Ramalingam Pillai, popularly known as 'Namakkal Kavignar'. This building accommodates more than 30 departments and conference halls.

== Renovations ==
In 2011, it was decided to renovate the building by augmenting the built-up area in the front and the rear. Renovation of the multi-storied building began on 3 March 2012 with the then Chief Minister Jayalalithaa laying the foundation stone for the work. The renovation work cost ₹ 280 million. The renovation features have been designed by CNR Architects, after getting the approval of Archeological Department and the Heritage Committee of the Chennai Metropolitan Development Authority for the renovation works.

Renovation of the external facade of the building comprised traditional and modern architectural features. Main features of the renovation include power-saving lighting arrangements within the building, centralised air conditioning, measures to ensure dust-free environment, installation of glass panels to prevent penetration of heat for up to 3,540 sq.ft. a lawn measuring 1,700 sq.ft. in front of the building, and a fountain.

While the renovation of the facade cost ₹ 145 million, the electrical infrastructure, including revamped centralised air-conditioning system, was completed at ₹ 135 million.

A modern gym with about 29 equipments, built at a cost of ₹ 5 million, was also part of the renovation.

== See also ==
- List of tallest buildings in Chennai
- Architecture of Chennai
