= Alwi Mosque =

Mosque in Kangar, Perlis, Malaysia

- Masjid Alwi مسجد علوي
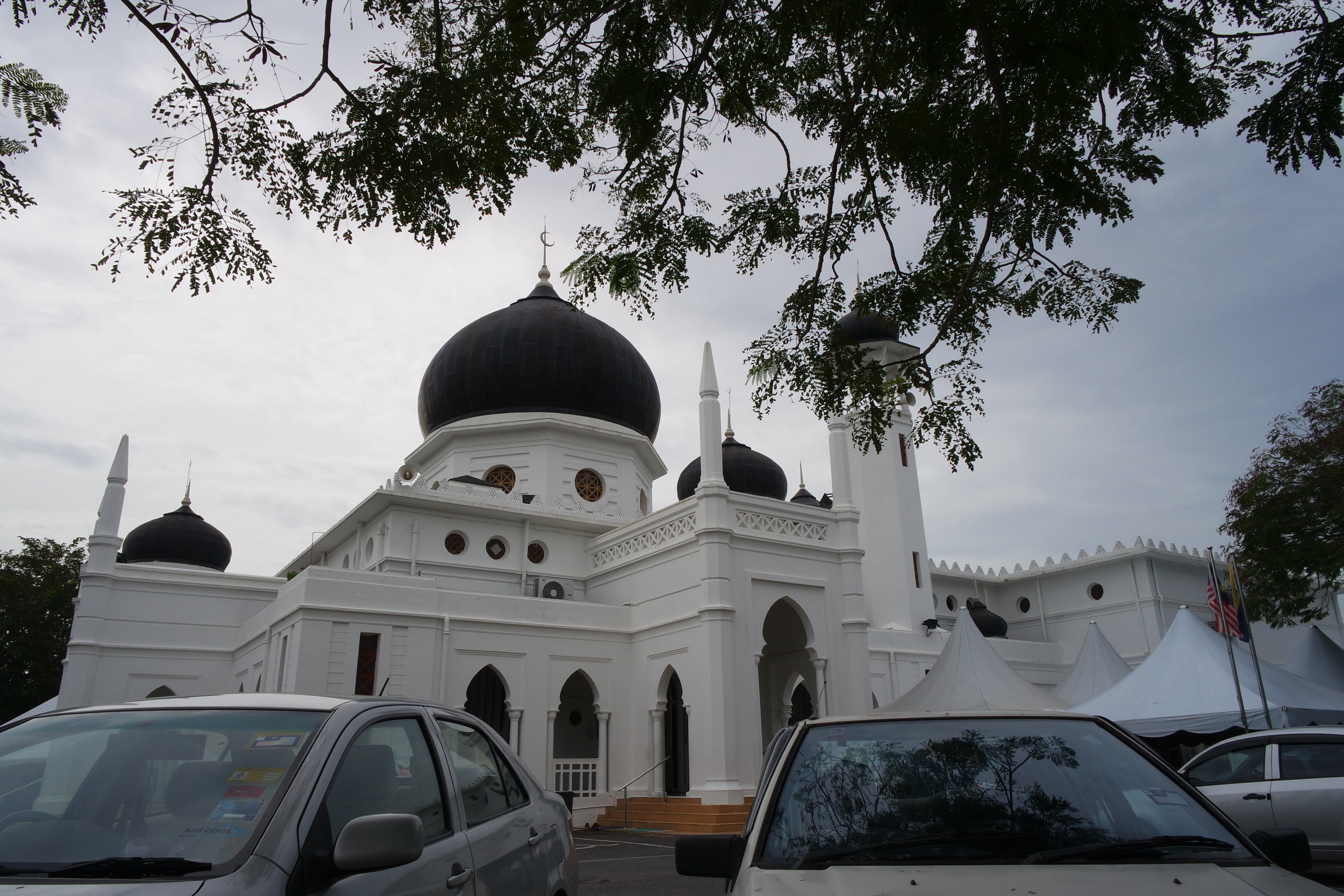

- Location within Perlis

Religion
- Affiliation: Islam
- Branch/tradition: Sunni

Location
- Location: Kangar, Perlis, Malaysia
- Interactive map of Alwi Mosque
- Coordinates: 6°26′27.1″N 100°11′52.4″E

Architecture
- Type: mosque
- Style: Mughal
- Groundbreaking: 1931
- Completed: 1933

The Alwi Mosque (Malay: Masjid Alwi) is a mosque in Kangar, Perlis, Malaysia.

== Name ==
The mosque is named after the Raja of Perlis at that time, Raja Syed Alwi Ibni Almarhum Tuan Syed Saffi Jamalullail.

== History ==
Efforts to collect funds to construct the mosque began in the 1920s. Construction began in 1931 and was completed in 1933. It was then officially opened by Raja Syed Alwi. The mosque was declared a national heritage in 1988 under the National Heritage Act 2005.

== Architecture ==
The mosque was constructed with Mughal architecture in mind.

== See also ==
- Islam in Malaysia
- List of mosques in Malaysia
