= Haji Abdul Rahman Limbong =

Malay ulama (1868–1929)

Haji Abdul Rahman bin Haji Abdul Hamid
- Born: 1868; Telemung, Terengganu, British Malaya
- Died: 1929 (aged 60 or 61); Mecca, Hejaz-Nejd
- Other names: Haji Abdul Rahman Limbong
- Occupation(s): farmer, trader, religious teacher

Haji Abdul Rahman bin Haji Abdul Hamid (1868–1929) was a Malay ulama. He was nicknamed Haji Abdul Rahman Limbong because he visited Limbong, Kemaman, Terengganu to teach Islam and start trading. From 1922 until 1928, he was a resistance leader against laws and changes introduced by the British.

== Early life ==
Haji Abdul Rahman bin Haji Abdul Hamid was born in Telemong, Terengganu. He was respected and loved by Malay society.

Prior to the British arrival, Terengganu had Islam-based rules and administrations. The society freely opened up their land for farming and collecting crops.

== British occupation ==
When the British came, new laws about the ways to open up land were introduced. One of them involves paying a tax to the government before using it. This new law made it difficult for everyone, especially poor farmers. To make things worse, the permission letters and passes from the government for opening up lands were also introduced. Despite the laws being introduced by the British, Haji Abdul Rahman Limbong fought to protect the livelihood and means of survival of farmers, claiming that land belongs to God, and eventually to those who work on it.

In 1922, Haji Abdul Rahman Limbong represented one of the 43 farmers being put to trial in a court for doing farming without permission. In numerous hearings that followed, no results had been given.

In 1925, about 300 to 500 farmers cleared Tengku Haji Nik's land without permission from the government.

== Insurgency ==
In 1928, following a series of restrictions and crackdowns by the British, Haji Abdul Rahman Limbong assembled about 1,000 people in Kampung Buluh, to launch their resistance to get the British out of their state. They attacked the police station in Kuala Berang, and captured it, raising a red flag in its place. After the attack, they moved on to Kuala Terengganu, to persuade the Sultan to endorse their actions.

Meanwhile, another group of resistance fighters was formed at Kampung Pelam, Telemong. The British representative sent police from the state's capital to Kuala Berang to get aid from the Federated Malay States.

As the resistance forces approached Padang Kachong, Kuala Telemong, the police defended against the resistance. Most of the resistance fighters died in the battle, and the resistance retreated.

== Aftermath and final years ==
All of the leaders involved in the insurgency of Terengganu citizenry had been found and put on trial. The majority of them were sentenced to life in prison.

Haji Abdul Rahman Limbong, who was among the guilty, but was not sentenced like most of his leaders. Instead, he was exiled from Terengganu to Mecca, where he continued to teach Islam, until his death in 1929.

== Places named after him ==
- Jalan Haji Abdul Rahman Limbong in Kuala Terengganu, Terengganu
- Abdul Rahman Limbong Mosque in Kuala Terengganu, Terengganu
- Kolej Siswa Abdul Rahman Limbong, a residential college at Universiti Malaysia Terengganu, Kuala Terengganu, Terengganu
- Sekolah Menengah Kebangsaan Abdul Rahman Limbong, Kuala Terengganu, Terengganu
