= Secretariat =

Secretariat may refer to:

- Secretariat (administrative office)
- Secretariat (horse), a racehorse that won the Triple Crown in 1973
  - Secretariat (film), a 2010 film about the racehorse
  - Secretariat, a pantomime horse that appeared on The Late Late Show with Craig Ferguson
- Secretariat Mosque, a mosque in Hyderabad, India
- Secretariat Park, an urban park in Chennai, India

== See also ==
- Secretariat Building (disambiguation), a number of office edifices
- Cabinet Secretariat (disambiguation)
- Central Secretariat (disambiguation)
- Secretariat Building (disambiguation)
