= Oswald Francis Gerard Stonor =

British colonial administrator

Oswald Francis Gerard Stonor CMG

12th British Resident of Selangor
- In office 1921–1926
- Preceded by: Arthur Henry Lemon
- Succeeded by: Henry Wagstaffe Thomson

16th British Resident of Perak
- In office 1926–1927
- Preceded by: Sir Cecil William Chase Parr
- Succeeded by: Henry Wagstaffe Thomson

Personal details
- Born: 3 June 1872
- Died: 22 June 1940 (aged 68); Saint-Jean-de-Luz, France
- Spouse: Florence Mary Josephine Wolseley
- Children: 3

Oswald Francis Gerard Stonor CMG (3 June 1872 – 22 June 1940) was a British colonial administrator who served in British Malaya.

== Career ==
Stonor joined the Malay civil service as a junior officer in 1890, and began his career as Acting Private Secretary to Governor of the Straits Settlements, Cecil Clementi Smith. He then served in various positions including Assistant District Officer at Serendah; District Officer at Ulu Langat; Acting Registrar of Titles and Collector of Land Revenue at Kuala Lumpur; District Officer at Tapah, and District Officer at Batang Padang. In 1921, he was promoted to British Resident of Selangor where he remained until 1926 when he was appointed British Resident of Perak. He retired from the service after less than a year in the post due to illness.

== Personal life ==
Stonor was born on 3 June 1872, the son of Charles Joseph Stonor and Maude Mary Welman. He married Florence Mary Josephine on 24 October 1906 and they had three children. He was a keen cricketer, captaining the Selangor Cricket team, and donated the Stonor Cup which was contested for many years. His career was cut short when he failed to recover from an operation and was forced to return home in 1926. He died on 22 June 1940, in Saint-Jean-de-Luz, France, aged 68.

== Awards and legacy ==
Stonor was awarded the CMG in 1925. Stonor Road (now Jalan Stonor) in Kuala Lumpur was named after him.
