= Henry Wagstaffe Thomson =

British colonial administrator (1874 – 1941)

Henry Wagstaffe Thomson CMG

British Adviser Kelantan
- In office 1919–1921
- Preceded by: John Whitehouse Ward Hughes
- Succeeded by: Arthur Furley Worthington

British Resident Pahang
- In office 1921–1926
- Preceded by: Cecil William Chase Parr
- Succeeded by: Arthur Furley Worthington

British Resident Selangor (Acting)
- In office 1926–1926
- Preceded by: Oswald Francis Gerard Stonor
- Succeeded by: James Lornie

British Resident Perak
- In office 1926–1929
- Preceded by: Oswald Francis Gerard Stonor
- Succeeded by: Arthur Furley Worthington

Personal details
- Born: 22 February 1874
- Died: 22 April 1941 (aged 67) In Torquay in German air raid
- Spouse: Yvonne Mary Winn
- Profession: Colonial administrator

Henry Wagstaffe Thomson CMG (22 February 1874 – 22 April 1941) was a British colonial administrator who served in Malaya from 1896 to 1928.

== Early life ==
Henry Wagstaffe Thomson was born on 22 February 1874, and was educated at Trinity College, Oxford.

== Career ==
In 1896, he entered the civil service of the Federated Malay States in Selangor as a cadet, was acting assistant Collector of Revenue in Kuala Lumpur (1899-1900), and District Officer at Serendah and then at Kuantan (1900-1903).

In 1903, he was sent on secondment by the government of the Federated Malay States to act as assistant to the British adviser in Kelantan, Siam, where he remained until 1910, receiving from the King of Siam, on an official visit to Kelantan, the 4th Class of the Order of the Crown of Siam.

In 1910, he returned to the Federated Malay States and occupied various positions including District Officer, Klang (1910-1913), Collector of Land Revenue and Registrar of Titles, Selangor (1914-15), District Officer, Larut (1915), and Registrar of Titles, Perak.

In 1919, whilst serving as Chairman of the Kinta Sanitary Board, he was appointed to the substantive position of British adviser to Kelantan having previously acted as assistant in the state for seven years. He remained in office until 1921 when he was appointed British Resident of Pahang, and after five years occupied the same position in Perak, prior to which he briefly acted as British Resident in Selangor. In 1927, he was made Acting Chief Secretary of the Federated Malay States.

== Retirement and death ==
Thomson retired in 1928 to England. He was killed on 22 April 1941 in Torquay during a German bombing raid.

== Honours ==
In 1905, Thomson received the 4th Class Order of the Crown of Siam from the King of Siam whilst serving in Kelantan.

In the 1927 Birthday Honours, he was awarded the Order of St Michael and St George.
