= Bertram Walter Elles =

18th British Resident of Perak
- In office 1931–1932
- Preceded by: Charles Walter Hamilton Cochrane
- Succeeded by: Sir Geoffrey Edmund Cator

Personal details
- Born: 3 July 1877; Wimbledon, London
- Died: 1963 (aged 85–86)
- Spouse: Jean Challoner Lake

Bertram Walter Elles (3 July 1877 – 1963) was born in Wimbledon, London, the son of Jamieson Elles. On 24 February 1906, Elles married Jean Challoner Lake, daughter of Canon Henry Lake, at Saint Mary Abbots, Kensington. Upon his retirement, the Elles lived in Hartfield, Sussex.

Elles was education at Marlborough College and later admitted to King's College on 2 October 1896, where he graduated with a Bachelor of Arts degree in 1899. In 1903, he passed his Malay language examination.

== Career ==
Elles joined the Malayan Civil Service (1900 - 1932) and was posted to serve in the Malay States in various positions before became the British Resident of Perak; below is the list of offices he held.

1. Acting Collector of Land Revenue of Matang (1902),
2. Second Assistant to Resident General (1903)
3. Acting Second Secretary to Resident General (1903)
4. Acting Secretary to Resident of Negeri Sembilan (1906)
5. Acting Commissioner and Secretary of Sanitary Board of North Kinta (1910)
6. Resident Councillor of Malacca from (16 November 1928 - 10 April 1930)
7. British Resident of Perak (1931 - 1932)
