= George London (colonial administrator) =

British colonial administrator (1889-1957)

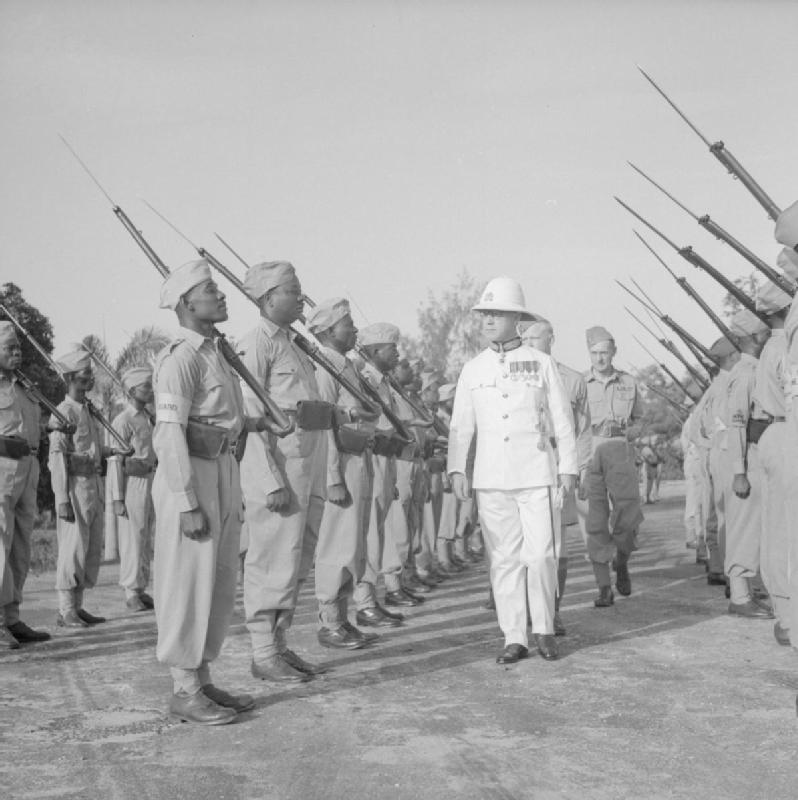
The Acting Governor of the Gold Coast in British West Africa, Sir George London, inspecting members of the Accra Home Guard.

Sir George Ernest London, CMG (6 April 1889 – 1957) was a British colonial administrator.

The son of Henry London, George London was educated at Warwick School and Downing College, Cambridge. He entered the Colonial Administrative Service in 1911. He was for a time in the Federated Malay States before the First World War, during which he served with the Gloucestershire Regiment and the Royal Engineers.

Returning to Malaya after the war, he rose to the rank of under-secretary to the government. He then went to the Gold Coast as Colonial Secretary, stepping down in 1944. From 1944 to 1945 he was a member of Newfoundland Commission of Government.

London was appointed a CMG in 1936 and knighted in 1942.

He married, in 1916, Helen Mary Reger, daughter of Lieutenant-Colonel F. P. Reger, and they had a son and a daughter.
