= Charles Walter Hamilton Cochrane =

Colonial Administrator

Charles Walter Hamilton Cochrane CMG

Chief Secretary to the Government (F.M.S.)
- In office 1930–1932
- Preceded by: Sir William Peel
- Succeeded by: Sir Andrew Caldecott

British Resident (Perak)
- In office 23 May 1929 – 9 April 1930
- Preceded by: Arthur Furley Worthington
- Succeeded by: Bertram Walter Elles

British Resident (Pahang)
- In office 15 February 1929 – 22 June 1929
- Preceded by: Arthur Furley Worthington
- Succeeded by: Charles Francis Joseph Green

British General Adviser (Johor)
- In office 1926–1928
- Preceded by: Hayes Marriott
- Succeeded by: George Ernest Shaw

Personal details
- Born: 3 August 1876
- Died: 26 October 1932 (aged 56)
- Spouse: Cecile Laura Vetter (m. 1910–1932)
- Children: Anthony Charles Talbot Cochrane (son) Daphne Cochrane (Daughter)
- Relatives: Arthur Cochrane; Alfred Cochrane
- Education: Repton School; Merton College, Oxford
- Occupation: Colonial Administrator

Charles Walter Hamilton Cochrane, MCS, CMG (3 August 1876 – 26 October 1932), was the 17th British Resident of Perak and Chief Secretary to Government of Malaya from 1929 to 1932.

== Career ==
In 1899, Cochrane joined the Federated Malay Civil Service as a cadet. He was an agent for the Malaya Information Agency, and became Under Secretary to the Government in 1921 and then in 1925 political Adviser in Johore. He became the 17th British Resident in Perak in 1929. He was appointed as the Acting Chief Secretary to Government on 30 November 1930, when Sir William Peel was on leave.

== Personal life ==
Cochrane was the fourth son of Rev. David Crawford Cochrane and Jane Elizabeth Tomlinson and was born at Barrow on Trent Vicarage. He was educated at Repton School where he was in the cricket XI and Merton College, Oxford where he graduated BA. Cochrane married Cecile Laura Vetter (1885-1957), daughter of Carlos Vetter, on 26 July 1910 and had two children. Cochrane was the brother of Arthur Cochrane of the College of Arms, and Alfred Cochrane cricketer and writer. He played cricket for the Straits Settlements cricket team in 1904 and 1905 and occasionally for the Federated Malay States cricket team from 1907 to 1913. Cochrane retired in 1932 and lived at 21 Cheyne Court Chelsea. He died aged 56 later that year at St Peter's Hospital, Henrietta Street Covent Garden.

== Awards and honours ==
Cochrane was invested with Companion of the Most Distinguished Order of St. Michael and St. George (CMG) in 1930.

== Legacy ==
"Jalan Cochrane" in Kuala Lumpur was named after him and consequently Cochrane Road School, SMK Cochrane Perkasa and the Cochrane MRT station take their names from him.

Government offices
Preceded by Hayes Marriott	British General Adviser (Johor); 1926-1928	Succeeded by George Ernest Shaw
Preceded by Arthur Furley Worthington	British Resident (Pahang); 1929	Succeeded by Charles Francis Joseph Green
Preceded by Arthur Furley Worthington	British Resident (Perak) (acting); 1929-1930	Succeeded by Bertram Walter Elles
Preceded by Sir William Peel	Chief Secretary to the Government (F.M.S.); 1930-1932	Succeeded by Sir Andrew Caldecott
