= James Lornie =

British colonial official in Malaya

James Lornie CMG
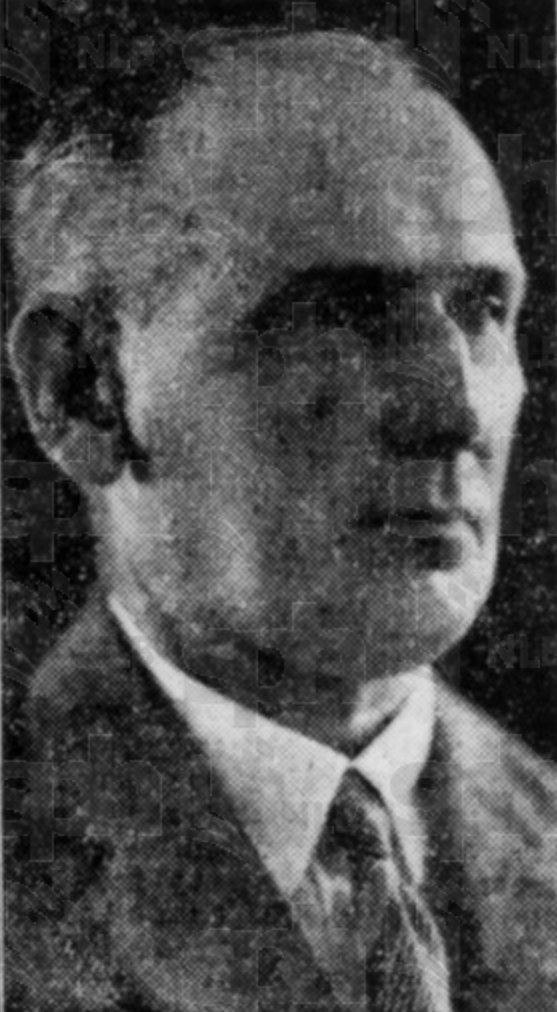

14th British Resident of Selangor
- In office 1927–1931
- Preceded by: Henry Wagstaffe Thomson
- Succeeded by: Geoffrey Cator

Personal details
- Born: 1876
- Died: 30 March 1959 (aged 82–83)
- Occupation: Colonial administrator

James Lornie CMG (1876 – 30 March 1959) was a Scottish colonial administrator who became the 14th British Resident of Selangor, Federated Malay States, serving from 1927 to 1931.

== Early life ==
James Lornie was born in 1876 and educated at Edinburgh University where he received a BSc and MA.

== Career ==
In 1899, Lornie joined the civil service of the Straits Settlements as a cadet and was sent to Malacca. After being appointed as acting head of Malay College in the town he occupied various administrative posts in government including Acting Assistant Registrar of the Supreme Court, magistrate and sheriff in Malacca, Acting District Officer Penang (1904–05) and Sitiawan, Perak (1908 –1910).

In 1911, Lornie went to Singapore to join the Land Office as Collector of Land Revenue and remained there for the next 11 years eventually becoming its head. During his tenure he became the leading authority on land values in Singapore stating in a case before the Supreme Court, as proof of his experience, that he had valued many millions of property for the Municipality and the Commissioner of Stamps. His largest undertakings included purchasing the land for the new Singapore naval base for $1.1 million for the government, and the acquisition of the land for Singapore municipality's new power station for $900,000. In 1925, he was appointed Deputy President of the Singapore Municipal Commissioners.

In 1926, Lornie left Singapore and went to Selangor to become the state's British Resident. This surprised many as he had spent very little time during his career in the Federated Malay States. One of the measures which he introduced was the Alien Ordinance which banned male migrants from mainland China from coming to the state of Selangor. After spending four years in the position he retired in 1931 to Buckinghamshire, and died on 30 March 1959.

== Writings ==
Lornie wrote a paper on Land Tenure which appeared as a chapter in the book One Hundred Years of Singapore (1921).

== Honours and legacy ==
In 1931, he was awarded the Order of St Michael and St George (CMG). The road Lornie Drive (now Jalan Syed Putra) in Kuala Lumpur, Malaysia was named after him.
