= Sulaiman Badrul Alam Shah of Terengganu =

Sultan of Terengganu (r. 1920–1942)

Sulaiman سليمان
- Sultan of Terengganu
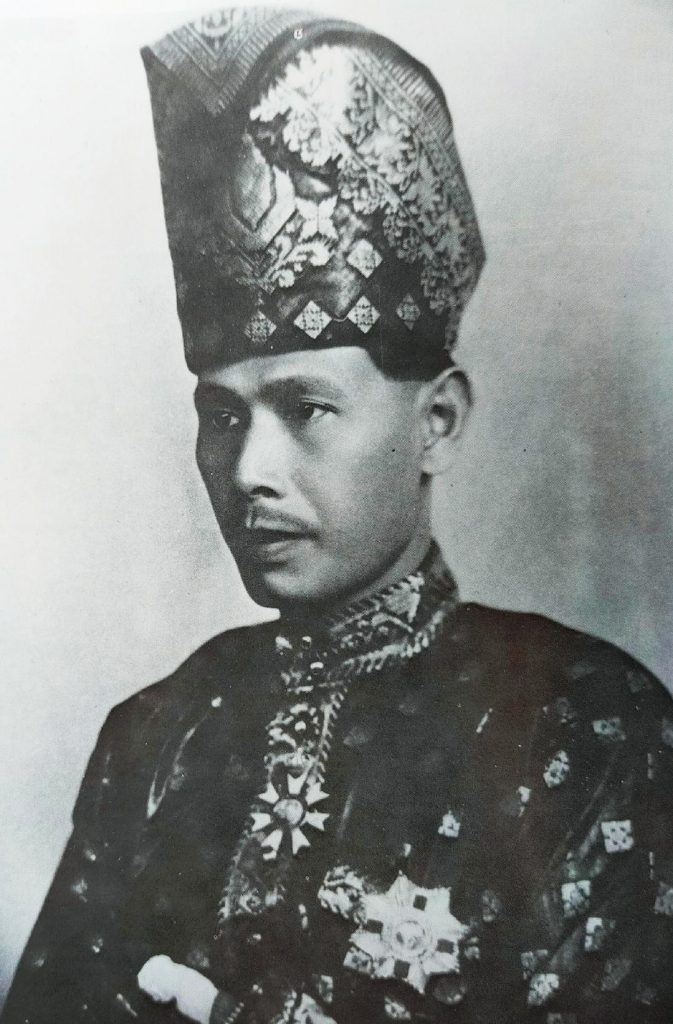

Sultan of Terengganu
- Reign: 21 May 1920 – 25 September 1942
- Coronation: 1921
- Predecessor: Sultan Muhammad Shah II
- Successor: Sultan Ali Shah
- Born: 1 December 1895; Kuala Terengganu, Terengganu
- Died: 25 September 1942 (aged 46); Kuala Terengganu, Terengganu
- Burial: Kubah Masjid Abidin, Kuala Terengganu
- Spouse: Tengku Mariam binti Sultan Ahmad Muad'zam Shah Pahang
- Issue: Sultan Ali Shah; Sultanah Asma of Kedah; Tengku Mahmud; Dato Lela Putra Tengku Abdul Aziz; Tengku Abdul Rashid; Tengku Datuk Haji Abdul Rahman; Tengku Wuk Atiqah; Tengku Fatimah; Tengku Azizah; Tengku Mariah
Names
- Sultan Sulaiman Badrul Alam Shah ibni Almarhum Sultan Zainal Abidin III
- House: Bendahara
- Father: Sultan Zainal Abidin III
- Mother: Cik Aisha binti Ismail
- Religion: Sunni Islam

Sultan Sulaiman Badrul Alam Shah ibni Almarhum Sultan Zainal Abidin III (Jawi: سلطان سليمان بدر العالم شاه ابن المرحوم سلطان زين العابدين ٣; 1 December 1895 – 25 September 1942) was the fourteenth Sultan of Terengganu from 21 May 1920 to 25 September 1942.

== Life ==
Sultan Sulaiman Badrul Alam Shah was born as Tengku Sulaiman Shah on 1 December 1895 at the Istana Maziah, Kuala Terengganu. He was the third son of Sultan Zainal Abidin III of Terengganu with his second wife, Cik Aisha binti Ismail.

== Sultan of Terengganu ==
Following the abdication of Sultan Muhammad Shah II of Terengganu in 1920, his younger brother, Tengku Muda Sulaiman ascended the throne on 21 May 1920 as Sultan Sulaiman Badrul Alam Shah of Terengganu.

His reign saw the growth of Malay nationalism in Terengganu. During the 1920s, growing anti-British sentiment in Terengganu led to uprisings in 1922, 1925 and 1928 which were led by Haji Abdul Rahman Limbong. The uprisings was later quelled by the British and the leader was exiled to Mecca, Saudi Arabia, where he died in 1929.

Kesatuan Melayu Muda, a nationalist organisation in Malaya, was formed during Sultan Sulaiman's reign.

== Marriage and children ==
On 21 July 1911, at the age of 16, Tengku Sulaiman Shah married Tengku Mariam, the daughter of Sultan Ahmad Muad'zam Shah of Pahang. The marriage strengthened the relationship between Terengganu and Pahang.

Sultan Sulaiman and his wife had ten children, five sons and five daughters. The eldest was Tengku Ali who succeeded his father as Sultan Ali Shah upon Sultan Sulaiman's death in 1942. The Sultan's daughter, Tengku Asma, was married to Sultan Badlishah who would later become the Sultan of Kedah.

== Death ==
Sultan Sulaiman Badrul Alam Shah died on 25 September 1942 at the Istana Timur Padang Negara. He was succeeded by his eldest son, Tengku Ali as the Sultan of Terengganu.

He was buried at Abidin Royal Mausoleum, Kuala Terengganu.

Sulaiman Badrul Alam Shah of Terengganu Bendahara dynasty Born: 1895 Died: 1942
Regnal titles
Preceded by Muhammad Shah II	Sultan of Terengganu; 1920–1942	Succeeded by Ali Shah
