= List of British Residents of Perak =

This is a list of the British Residents of Malay State of Perak, British Malaya. The position of Resident was an administrative post. By the terms of the Pangkor Treaty, the Resident was an adviser to His Highness Sultan of Perak whose decisions were binding in all matters in administration except for Malay customs and religion. The British Resident post is also equivalent with today's Menteri Besar post, where he was the chairman of the Perak State Council and the Sultan was the Lord President of the Council. The official residence for the Resident was at the Residency Hill, Taiping. Other residences were also available in Kuala Kangsar and Ipoh. After World War II, the position of British Resident was replaced by a British Adviser. Eventually, when Malaya achieved Independence, the British Adviser post was abolished.

British Resident	Portrait	Honour	Entered office	Left office
1. James Wheeler Woodford Birch		none	4 November 1874	2 November 1875
2. Sir Frank Athelstane Swettenham		GCMG, CH	5 November 1875	March 1876
3. James Guthrie Davidson		none	11 April 1876	31 March 1877
4. Sir Hugh Low		GCMG, KCMG, CMG	1 April 1877	31 May 1889
5. Sir Frank Athelstane Swettenham		GCMG, CH	1 June 1889	30 June 1896
6. Sir William Hood Treacher		KCMG	1 July 1896	12 December 1901
7. Sir John Pickersgill Rodger		KCMG, CMG	13 December 1901	9 February 1904
8. Sir Ernest Woodford Birch		KCMG, CMG	10 February 1904	5 March 1911
9. Sir Henry Conway Belfield		KCMG, CMG, JP	6 March 1911	15 December 1911
10. Oliver Marks			15 December 1911	9 August 1912
11. Colonel William James Parke Hume		CMG	9 August 1912	12 August 1912
12. Sir Reginald George Watson		CMG	12 August 1912	17 September 1919
13. Sir William George Maxwell (acting to 19 December 1919)		KBE, CMG	17 September 1919	12 September 1920
14. Colonel William James Parke Hume (acting for Maxwell to 12 September 1921)		CMG	29 June 1920	13 July 1921
15. Sir Cecil William Chase Parr		CMG, OBE	14 July 1921	20 December 1925
16. Oswald Francis Gerard Stonor			20 December 1925	6 June 1927
17. Henry Wagstaffe Thomson			6 June 1927	1929
18. Charles Walter Hamilton Cochrane		CMG	1929	1930
19. Bertram Walter Elles		none	1931	1932
20. Sir Geoffrey Edmund Cator		CMG	1933	1939
21. Marcus Rex		CMG	1939	1941
22. Arthur Vincent Aston		CMG, MC	1946	1948
23. James Innes Miller			1948	1951
24. Edwin Cyril Geddes Barrett (acting to Blelloch)		CMG	1953	1954
25. Dato’ Ian Blelloch		CMG	1951	1956
