= Terminal 17 Shah Alam =

General information
- Location: Jalan Jenulung 17/21, Seksyen 17, 40200 Shah Alam, Selangor
- Coordinates: 3°02′50″N 101°30′15″E
- Owner: Shah Alam City Council
- Operator: Rapid Bus (local bus shuttles); Pancaran Matahari; Maraliner; Ekspres Mutiara; Many others

Other information
- Website: www.terminal17.my

History
- Closed: 15 December 2013 (major renovation)
- Rebuilt: 1 May 2019 (As Terminal 17 Shah Alam)
Location

Terminal 17 Shah Alam is an intercity bus terminal serving the city of Shah Alam, Selangor, Malaysia. It was opened as early as the 1980s.

== History ==
Shah Alam intercity bus terminal in Seksyen 17 started operation during the 1980s. Eventually, as the facilities started to age, a modernization project was executed.

On 15 December 2014, the terminal was closed and operations moved to Seksyen 13 temporary bus terminal.

The terminal was originally planned for reopening in 2015. However, after series of delays, the terminal finally reopened on 1 May 2019.

== Facilities ==
The terminal provides an air conditioned waiting hall, which can fit 300 people. It has 10 ticketing counters, and the boarding system adapted the Centralised Ticketing System. Bathrooms and a praying room are provided indoors. Convenience stores operate in the station.

== Connections ==
- SA03 Smart Selangor free bus: Seksyen 18, 20, 24 and 19, terminates at Shah Alam Komuter station.
- SA04 Smart Selangor free bus (operated by RapidKL): to Padang Jawa Komuter station, Seksyen 16, i-City (Seksyen 7), Universiti Teknologi MARA Shah Alam campus complex.
- T754 RapidKL bus: to Shah Alam city bus hub (Seksyen 14)
