= Padang Jawa =

Coordinates: 3°02′N 101°29′E

- Town
- Location within Malaysia
- Country: Malaysia
- State: Selangor
- District: Klang

Government
  - Local Authority: Shah Alam City Council
  - Mayor: Dato Hj Mohd Jaafar bin Hj Mohd Atan
- Time zone: UTC+8 (MST)
- Postcode: 40200
- Calling code: +6-03-33, +6-03-55

Padang Jawa is a village (kampung) and a suburb of Shah Alam, Selangor, Malaysia.

== Transit station ==
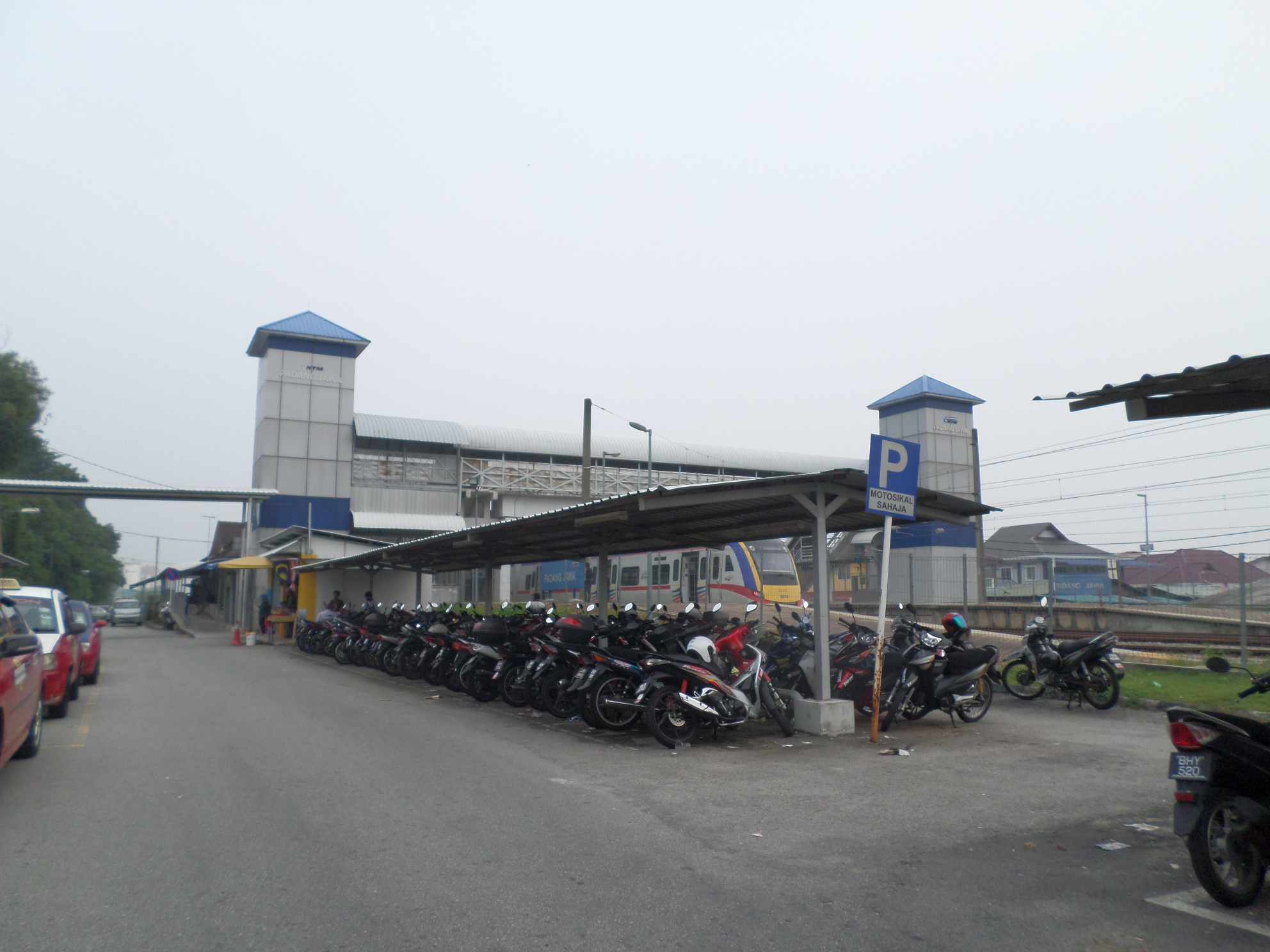
Padang Jawa Komuter station

Padang Jawa is served by the Padang Jawa Komuter station under the KTM Komuter Tanjung Malim–Port Klang Line.

== Nearby facilities ==
- The Selangor state head office of Road Transport Department Malaysia is located on Jalan Padang Jawa (Known for B number plate registration issuance).
- The PUSPAKOM Padang Jawa inspection centre is located next to Road Transport Department Malaysia office.
