= Sultan Alam Shah Museum =

Museum in Selangor, Malaysia

Coordinates: 3°04′30.8″N 101°31′16.0″E

- Muzium Sultan Alam Shah
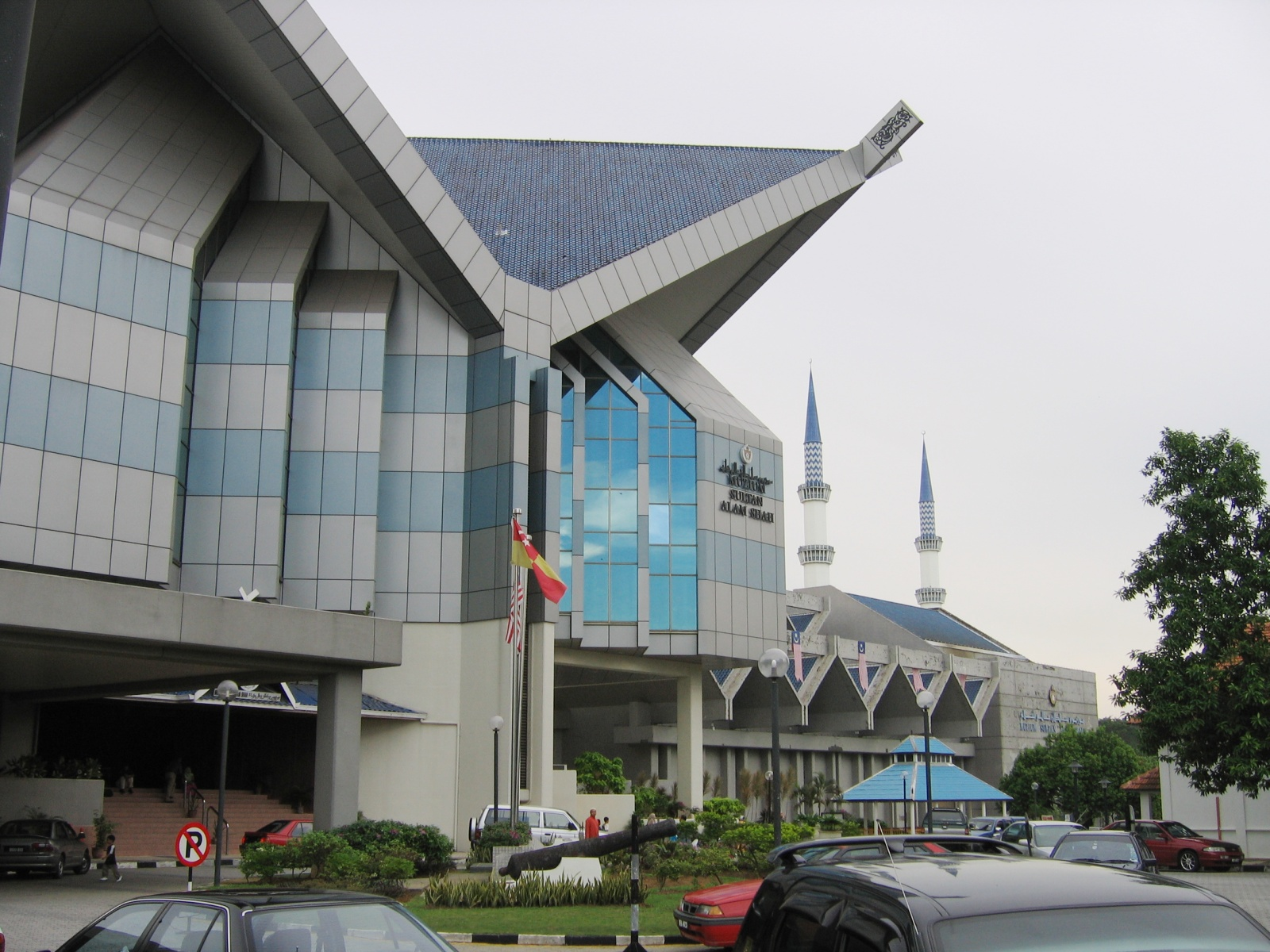
- Established: 2 September 1989
- Location: Persiaran Bandaraya, 40000 Shah Alam, Selangor, Malaysia
- Type: Museum

Sultan Alam Shah Museum (Malay: Muzium Sultan Alam Shah) is a museum in Shah Alam, Petaling, Selangor, Malaysia. It is the state museum of Selangor. This museum was opened in 1989 by Sultan Salahuddin Abdul Aziz Shah.

== History ==
The establishment of the State Museum, which is known with reference to the Sultan Alam Shah Museum, began when Sultan Salahuddin Abdul Aziz Shah consented to sign Royal Enactment #6, Year 1975 on 27 December 1975.

After several years of planning, the museum opened on 2 September 1989, the museum became a symbol of the state's cultural development and was officially opened by the Sultan of Selangor where the opening ceremony is done with a full event consisting of Malay traditions. Currently, the museum's administration is placed under the responsibility of the Selangor State Museums Department.

== Building ==
The Museum building was built on a land area of 12.95 hectares and a floor space of 41,538 square meters. This five-storey building consists of two floors of office space, three floors of exhibition space and the Daeng Menambun Exhibition Hall. There are five pavilions which consists of a History Centre, House of Culture, Sports Centre, Nature and Heritage Centre, Islamic Centre and Outdoor Exhibition areas. The museum is also equipped with facilities such as the Resource Centre, Auditorium, Raja Lumu Function Hall, Daeng Perani and Kemasik Meeting Rooms, Taxidermy Laboratory as well as a Historical Repository.

== Exhibits ==
- Arts & Culture: The unique culture and lifestyle of various ethnic groups in Selangor especially its native Malay population who belong to subethnicities such as Bugis, Javanese, Minangkabau, Banjar, Mandailing and Rawa as well as the dominant minority Malaysian Chinese who belong to different dialect groups such as the state's dominant Cantonese majority, Hakkas (second largest), Teochew, Hokkien, Hainanese and Foochow and to a lesser extent Indians and the indigenous Orang Asli inhabitants are highlighted through traditional, literary and artistic displays of their respective ethnicities including dioramas, traditional clothing, musical instruments, tools and weapons.
- Environmental: Selangor's rich biodiversity is illustrated through preserved animal specimens and life-like dioramas.
- Historical: Contains prehistoric artifacts which are found near early human settlements in the state.
- Islamic: Focuses on the history, arrival and growth of Islam in Selangor. Some of the artifacts on display include models of old mosques, pulpits, drums, domes, ablution jars, pottery, utensils, weapons and old books.
- Outdoor: Outdoor displays include a ferret armoured car, radar system, aeroplanes, locomotives and cars of the former chief ministers of Selangor.
- Sports: Highlights the history of sports and famous sportsmen in Malaysia.
- Temporary: In 2006, an exhibition on Malay ghosts and folklore was displayed in the museum.

== See also ==
- List of museums in Malaysia
