= Batu Tiga Komuter station =

Railway station in Malaysia

Coordinates: 3°04′33″N 101°33′36″E

Batu Tiga

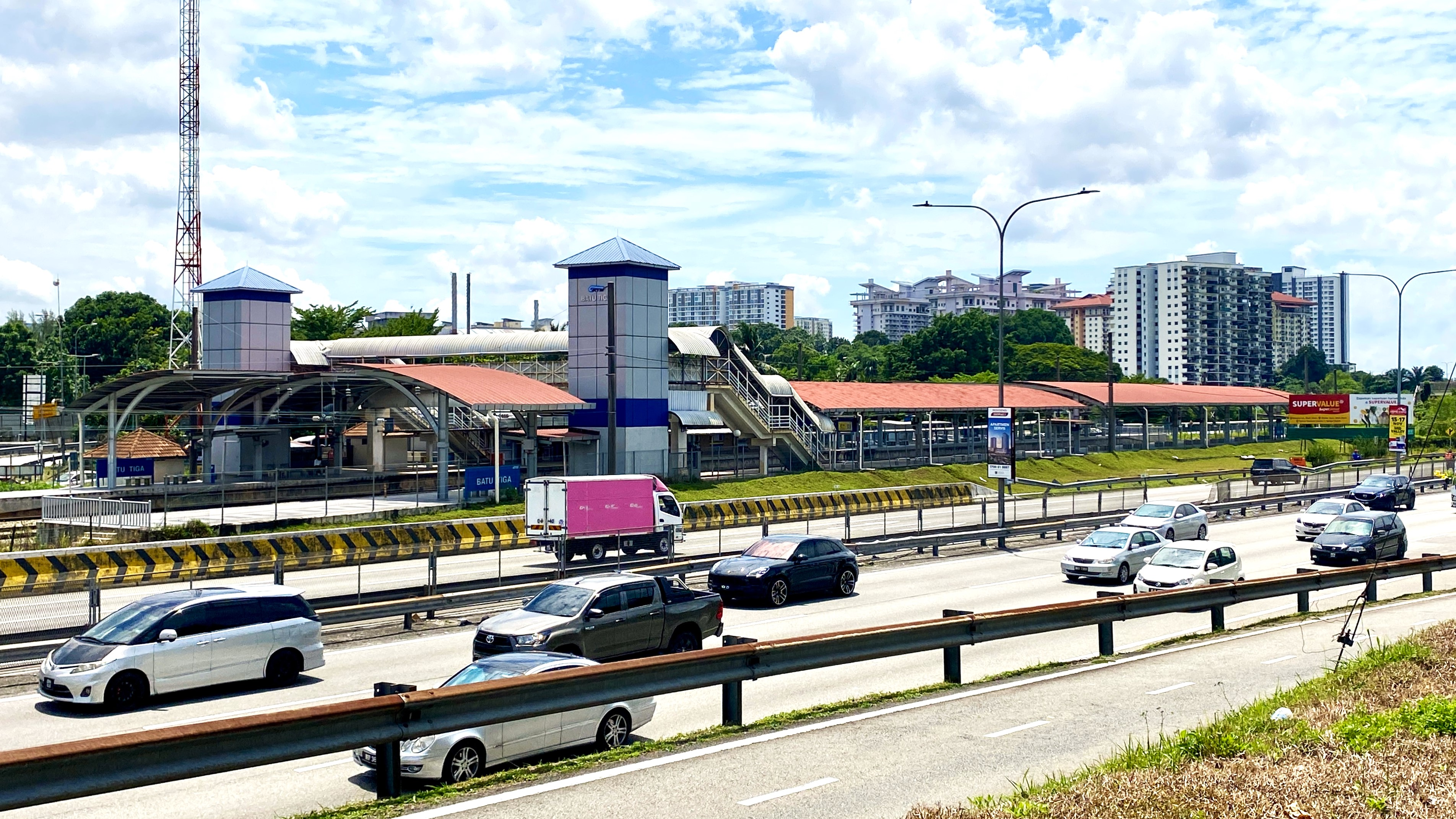
- Batu Tiga Komuter station next to the Federal Highway.

General information
- Other names: Malay: باتو تيݢ (Jawi); Chinese: 峇都知甲; Tamil: பத்து தீகா
- Location: Batu Tiga, 40150 Shah Alam, Selangor
- System: KD10 | Commuter rail station
- Owner: Keretapi Tanah Melayu
- Line: Port Klang Branch
- Platforms: 2 side platforms
- Tracks: 4
- Connections: Smart Selangor Bus SA02

Construction
- Parking: Available

Other information
- Station code: KD10

History
- Opened: 1995

Services
| Preceding station | Keretapi Tanah Melayu (Komuter) | Following station |
|---|---|---|
| Subang Jaya towards Tanjung Malim | Tanjung Malim–Port Klang Line | Shah Alam towards Port Klang |
Location

The Batu Tiga Komuter station is a KTM Komuter train station located in Batu Tiga, Selangor, Malaysia and served by the Port Klang Line.

== Location and locality ==
The station is located in the vicinity of Subang Hi-Tech Park, and right beside the Federal Highway, where Batu Tiga toll plaza used to stand. It was built to cater the traffic in the suburban areas of Shah Alam, specifically the western sections, and also eastern Subang Jaya areas like Pinggiran USJ. While it is always associated with Shah Alam, its location is already in Subang Jaya with the Shah Alam - Subang Jaya city border is close by.

Seksyen 13, the section which locates Shah Alam Stadium and Malawati Stadium is accessible from the station via Persiaran Jubli Perak. The Smart Selangor bus shuttle of SA02 between Seksyen 14 (city centre) and Seksyen 13 makes their stop here.

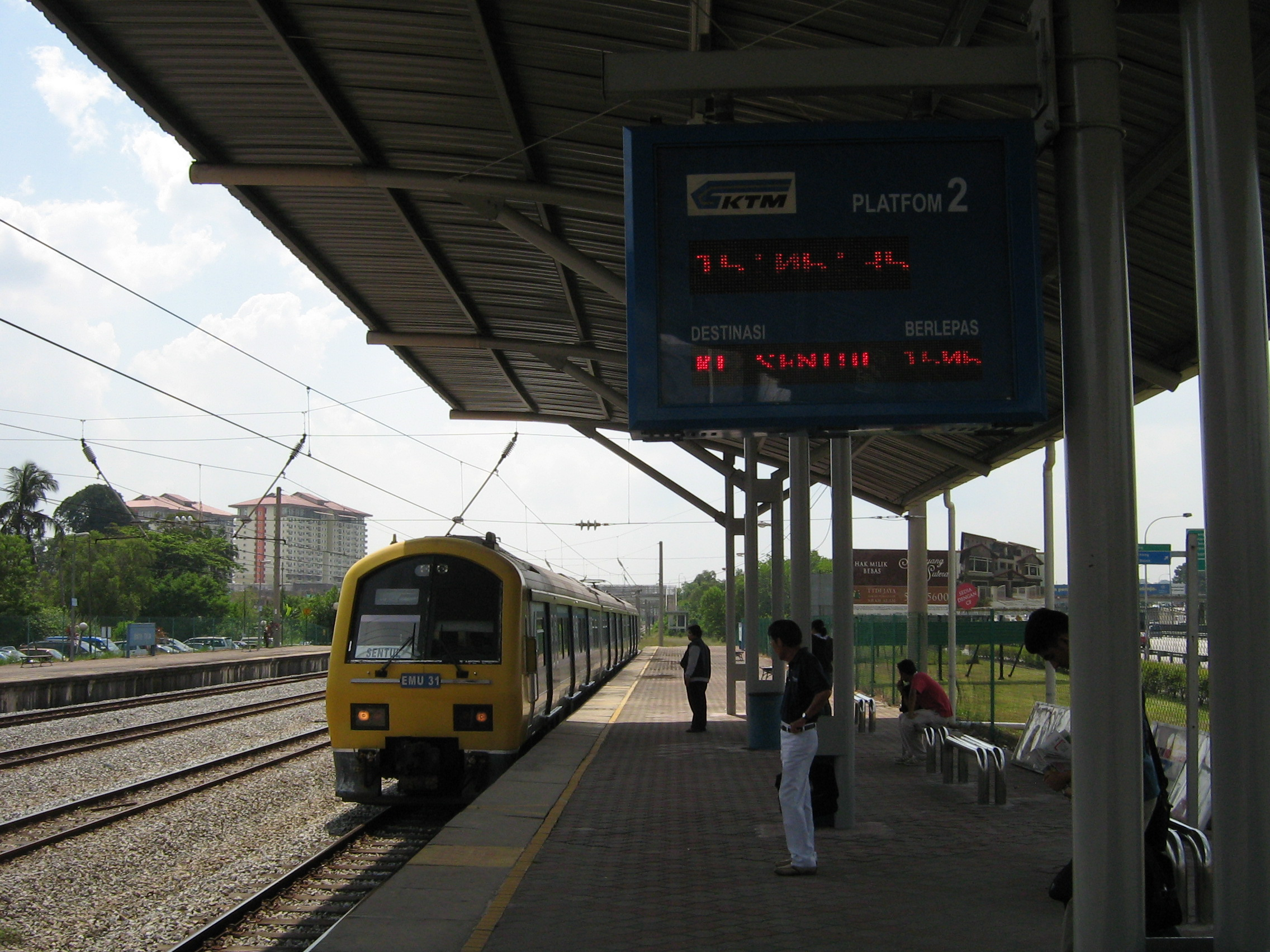
Platform of Batu Tiga station

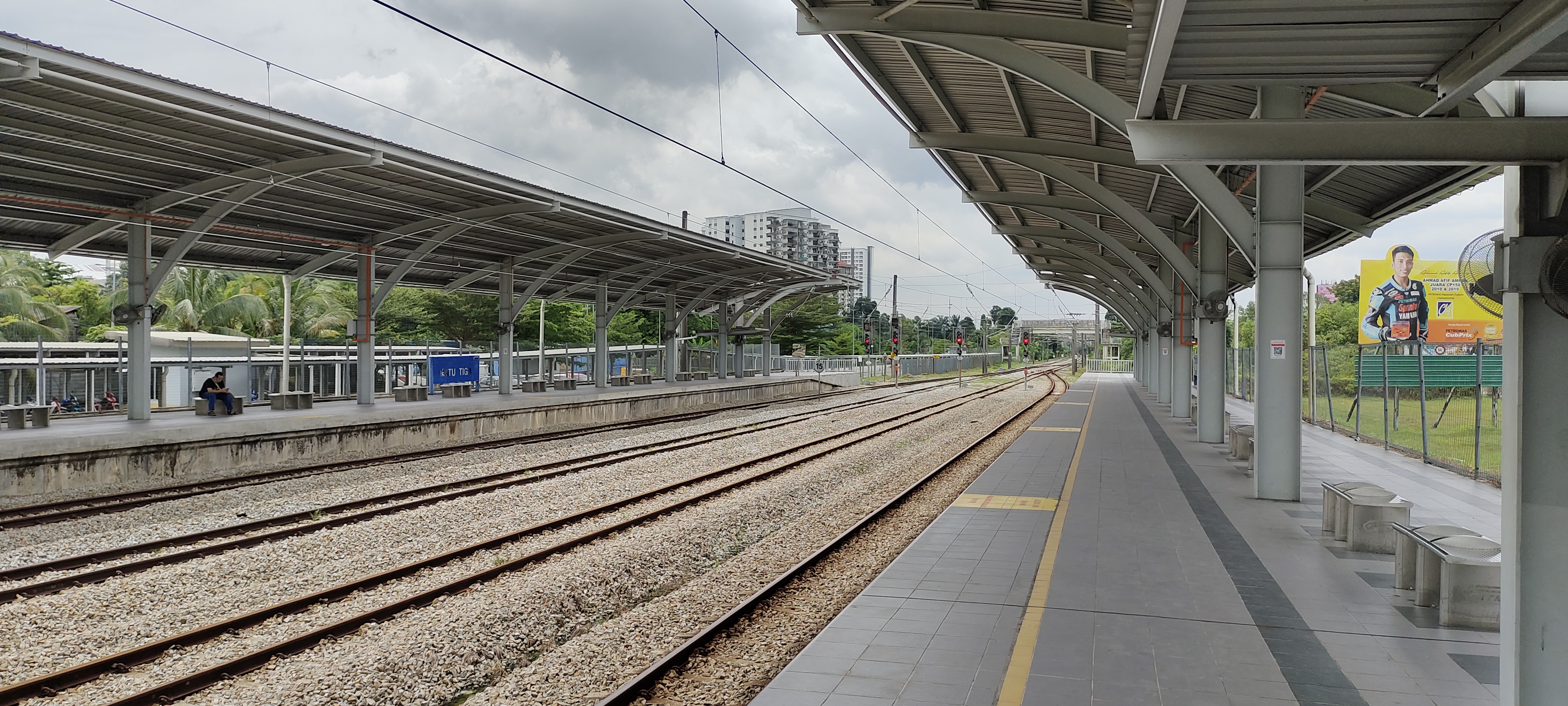
Another view of the platforms of Batu Tiga station
