= Shah Alam Komuter station =

Train station in Malaysia

Coordinates: 3°03′23″N 101°31′32″E

Shah Alam

General information
- Other names: Malay: شاه عالم (Jawi); Chinese: 莎阿南; Tamil: சா ஆலாம்
- Location: Seksyen 19, 40200 Shah Alam, Selangor
- System: KD11 | Commuter rail station
- Owner: Keretapi Tanah Melayu; Prasarana Malaysia
- Line: Port Klang Branch
- Platforms: 1 side platform; 1 island platform
- Tracks: 4

Construction
- Parking: Available

Other information
- Station code: KD11

History
- Opened: 1995

Services
Preceding station	KTM Komuter	Following station
Batu Tiga towards Tanjung Malim	Tanjung Malim–Port Klang Line	Padang Jawa towards Port Klang
Location

The Shah Alam Komuter station is a Komuter train station located in Seksyen 19, Shah Alam, Selangor, Malaysia. It is served by the KTM Komuter's Port Klang Line.

== Location and locality ==
The station is located in Seksyen 19 which is 4 kilometres away from the Shah Alam city centre. The section itself contains CIAST campus which is in front of the station. As per its namesake, it is meant to be Shah Alam's main railway station despite it being located quite further south, with road access from Persiaran Sultan to the city and Kemuning–Shah Alam Highway leads to sections down further south.

A local bus terminal provides free Smart Selangor bus shuttles around the city areas, with three lines originated from this terminal: SA01 (to city centre), SA03 (around Seksyen 19 and 20) and SA06 (to Taman Seri Muda and Kota Kemuning)

== History ==
The station was formerly a freight station and local train halt named Sungai Rengam Station in the 1980s.

== See also ==
- Rail transport in Malaysia
