= Batu Tiga =

- Suburb
- Location in Peninsular Malaysia
- Coordinates: 3°3′52″N 101°35′37″E
- Country: Malaysia
- State: Selangor

Government
  - Administered by: Subang Jaya Municipal Council
- Time zone: UTC+8 (MST)
- Website: http://www.mpsj.gov.my/

Batu Tiga (literally meaning mile three) is a suburb in Subang Jaya, Selangor, Malaysia. It is located at the border between Subang Jaya and Shah Alam. However, it is nearer to Shah Alam than the town centre of Subang Jaya. Subang Hi-Tech Industrial Park in the suburb serve as one of the most major industrial estates in the Klang Valley as it is situated in between Kuala Lumpur, Shah Alam, Klang and Subang.

Batu Tiga is under the jurisdiction of Subang Jaya Municipal Council. The suburb started out as an industrial estate, then low-cost residential developments sprouted up in 2000. It is usually mistaken to be located in Shah Alam because previously there were no roads linking it directly to Subang Jaya.

== Economy ==
Subang Hi-Tech is the main industrial area of Batu Tiga. Companies with a presence in the area include Nestlé.

AEON (company), Tesco, and Giant Hypermarket are the nearest shopping malls which are located in Seksyen 13, Shah Alam.

== Transport ==
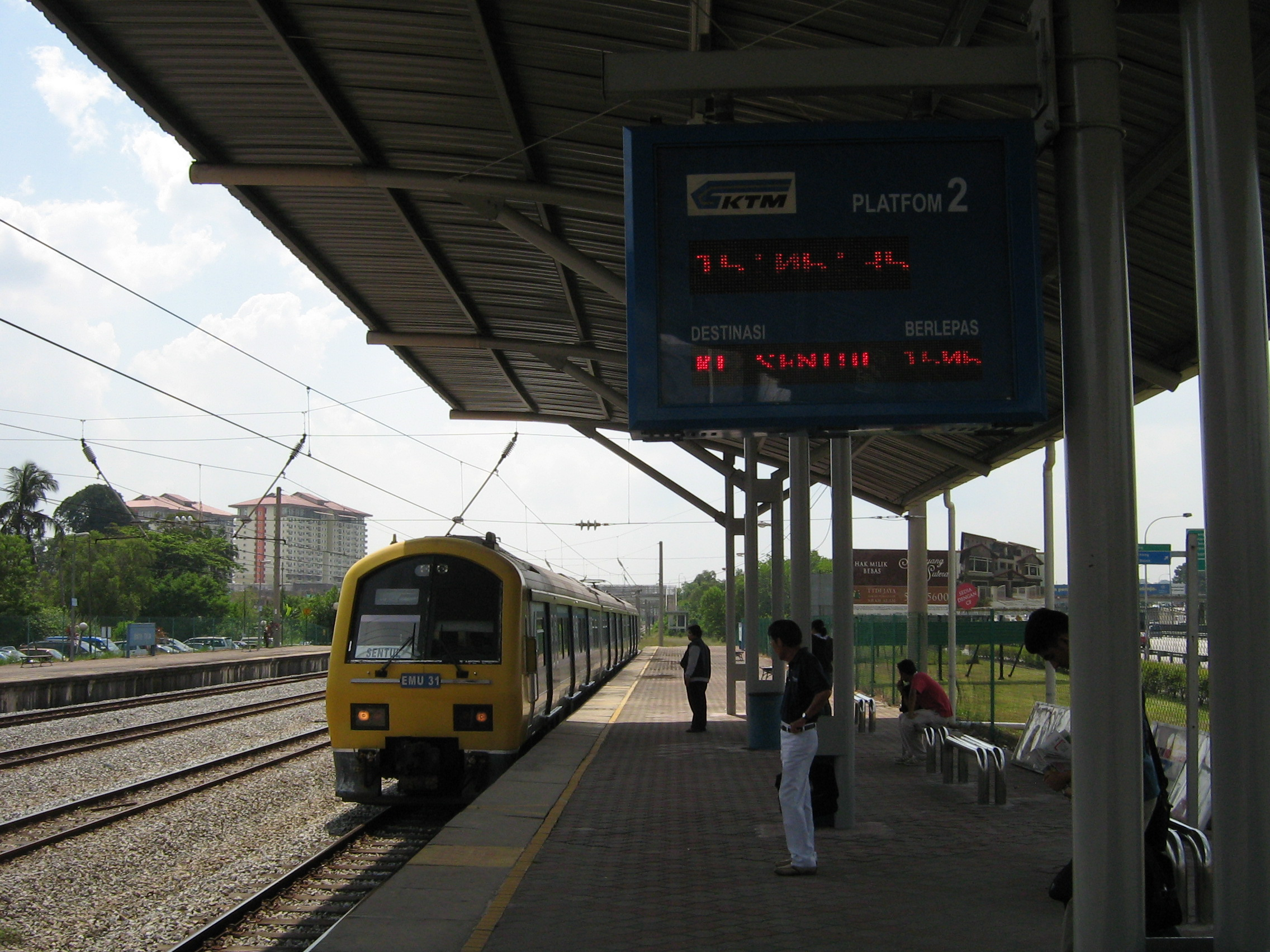
Batu Tiga Komuter station

It is accessible through many major expressways such as Elite Highway, NKVE, Federal Highway, KESAS highway and Subang Airport Highway. In 2009, a bridge linking USJ to the area was built. The Federal Highway was tolled at the Batu Tiga toll plaza until January 2018.

It is 3 km distance from the suburb to Glenmarie and Shah Alam Stadium. It is a 25 minutes drive from the suburb to Kuala Lumpur.

For public transport, there is Batu Tiga Komuter station. Foreign workers in the industrial areas usually use the train for transport. It was built to cater traffic in the suburban areas of Shah Alam and Klang.
