= CIAST =

Centre for Instructor and Advanced Skill Training
- Motto: Memperkasa Pengajar Kemahiran Malaysia
- Type: Public
- Established: 1984
- Students: 17,610 (2017)
- Location: Shah Alam, Selangor, Malaysia
- Website: www.ciast.gov.my

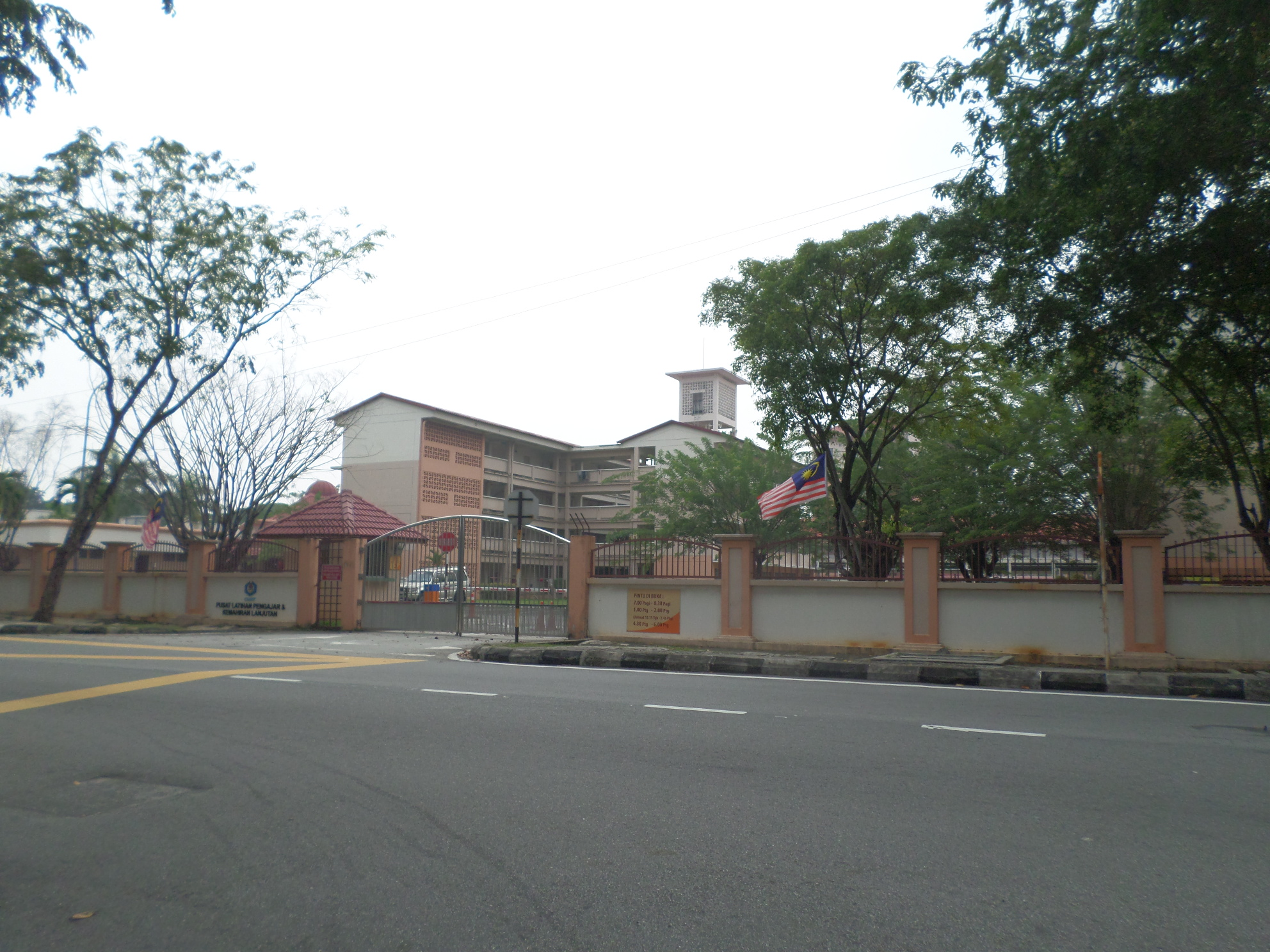
Centre for Instructor and Advanced Skill Training

The Centre for Instructor and Advanced Skill Training (CIAST; Malay: Pusat Latihan Pengajar dan Kemahiran Lanjutan) is under the aegis of the Manpower Department, Ministry of Human Resources of Malaysia and has been operational since 1984. Its establishment was sponsored by the Government of Japan under ASEAN Human Resources Development.

The centre offer courses in Instructor Training, Supervisory Training and Advanced Skill Training for instructors, supervisors and skilled workers from the private and public sectors.

Early in year 1994, the new department "National Instructor Training Program" (NITP) was established. The objective is to prepare skilled and competent instructors for training centres and industries.
