= Padang Jawa Komuter station =

Railway station in Padang Jawa, Malaysia

Coordinates: 3°03′09″N 101°29′34″E

Padang Jawa

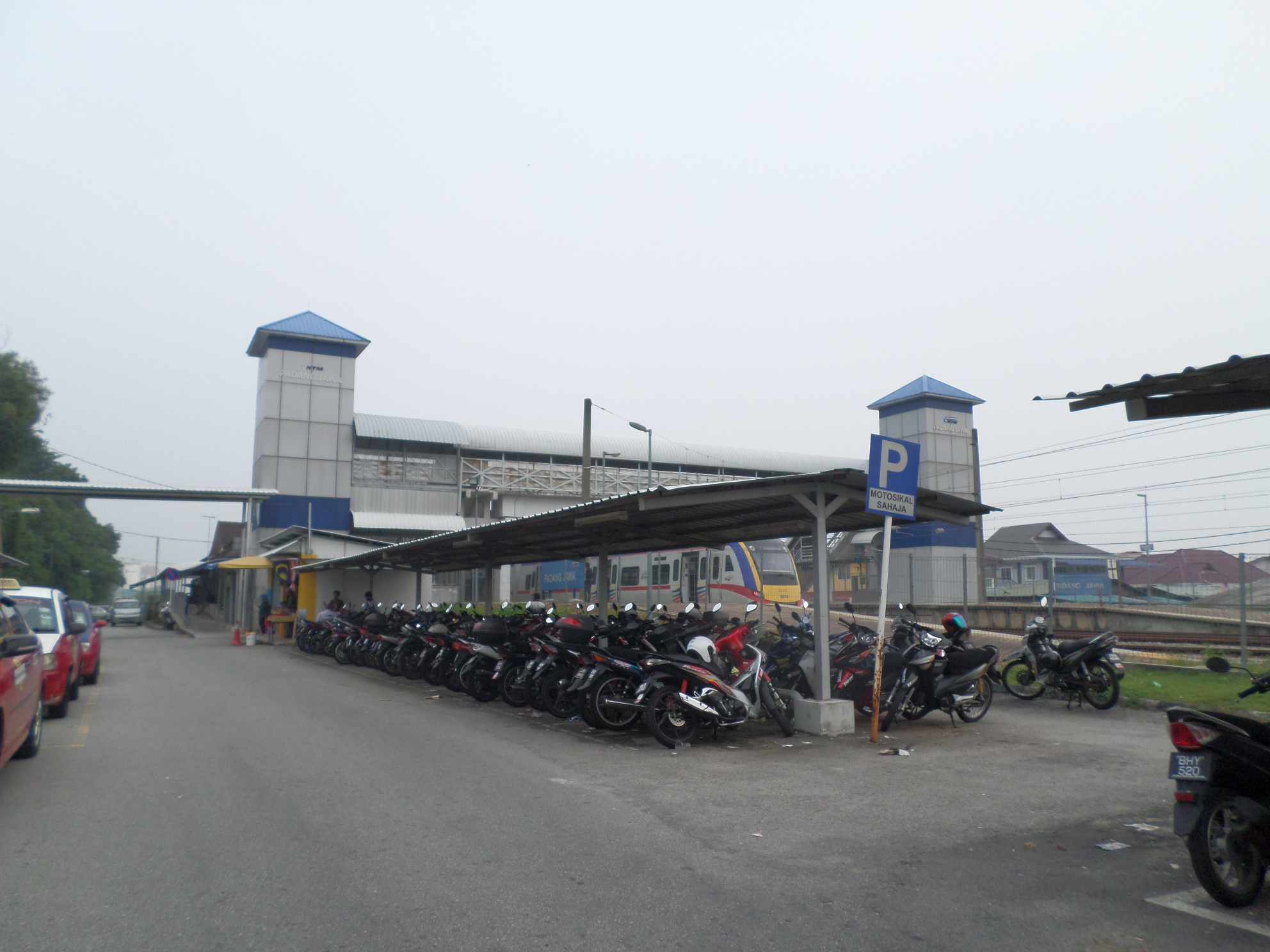

General information
- Other names: Malay: ڤادڠ جاوا (Jawi); Chinese: 巴当爪哇; Tamil: பாடாங் ஜாவா
- Location: Padang Jawa, 40400 Shah Alam, Selangor
- System: KD12 | Commuter rail station
- Owner: Keretapi Tanah Melayu
- Line: Port Klang Branch
- Platforms: 2 side platforms
- Tracks: 4

Construction
- Parking: Available

Other information
- Station code: KD12

History
- Opened: 1995

Services
Preceding station	Keretapi Tanah Melayu (Komuter)	Following station
Shah Alam towards Tanjung Malim	Tanjung Malim–Port Klang Line	Bukit Badak towards Port Klang
Location

The Padang Jawa Komuter station is a commuter train halt located in Padang Jawa, Selangor, Malaysia. It is served by the Port Klang Line.

== Location and locality ==
This station is located in Padang Jawa, a village locality in Seksyen 16. It is connected to Jalan Padang Jawa and further to Persiaran Kayangan leading to the city centre, and close to the Federal Highway. SK Padang Jawa primary school is located beside the station, and the residential-commercial complex of Suria Jaya is close by.

This was formerly the closest station to Universiti Teknologi MARA main campus in Shah Alam (within 2 kilometres) and also the i-City commercial and theme park in Seksyen 7 but with the LRT Shah Alam line, now both areas got its own nearby stations. A Smart Selangor free bus shuttle between the express bus terminal in Seksyen 17, i-City and UiTM make their stop here (SA04) but occasionally the bus skips the stop due to traffic reasons or weekly local market. For UiTM students, a dedicated campus shuttle is provided to and from the station.

== History ==
A 47 km branch line to Kuala Selangor once began from this station, until it was closed in the 1930s. It was originally a local halt before being upgraded as full train station under KTM Komuter in the 90s.

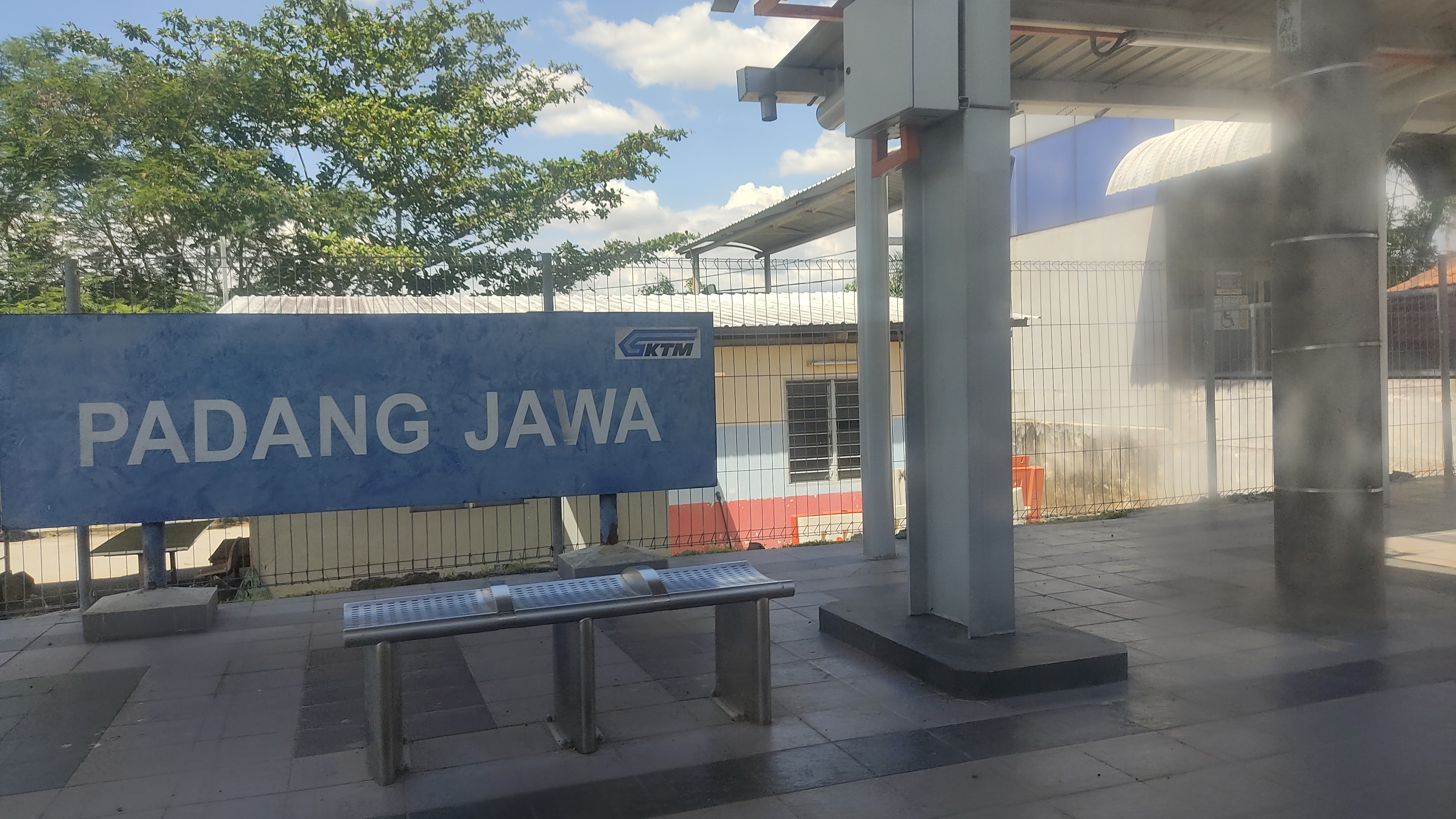
signboard of Padang Jawa

== See also ==
- Rail transport in Malaysia
