= Shah Alam =

- State capital city
- City of Shah Alam Bandaraya Shah Alam (Malay)
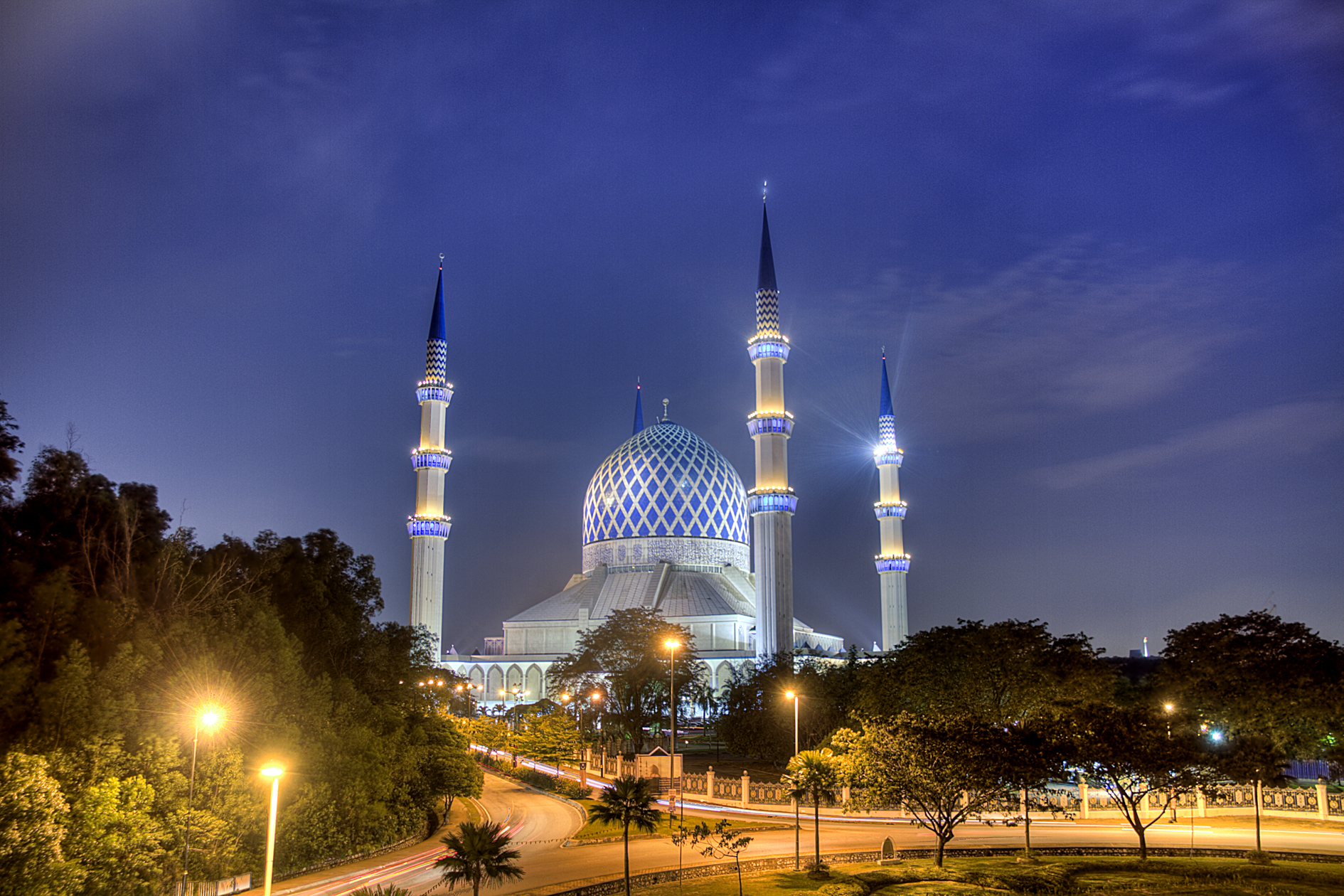
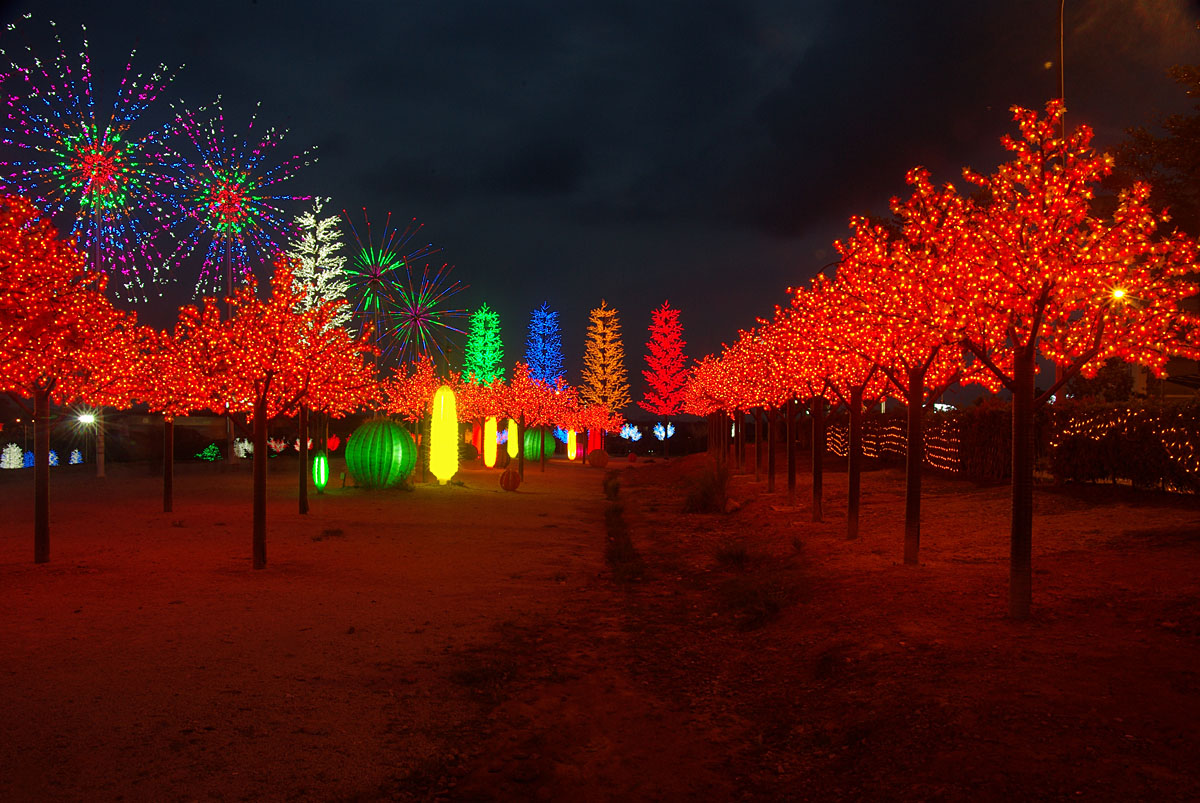
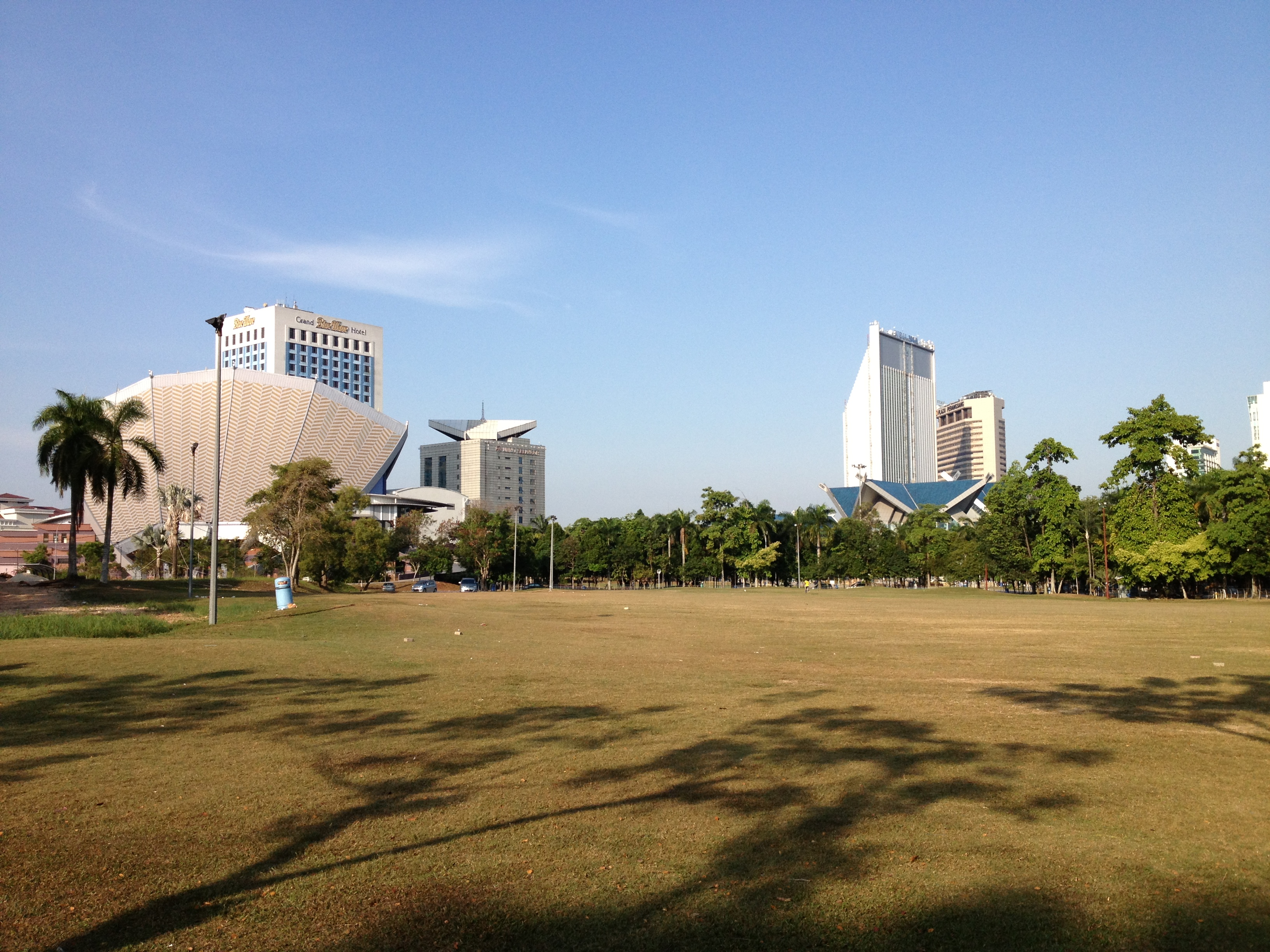
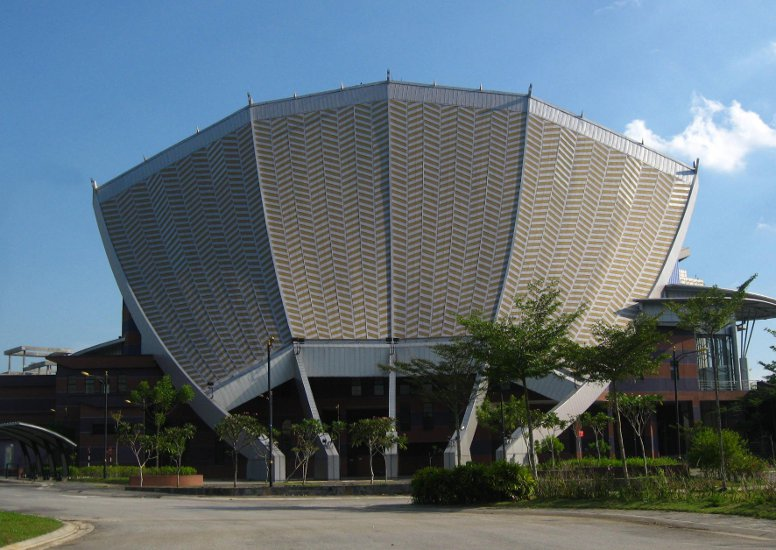
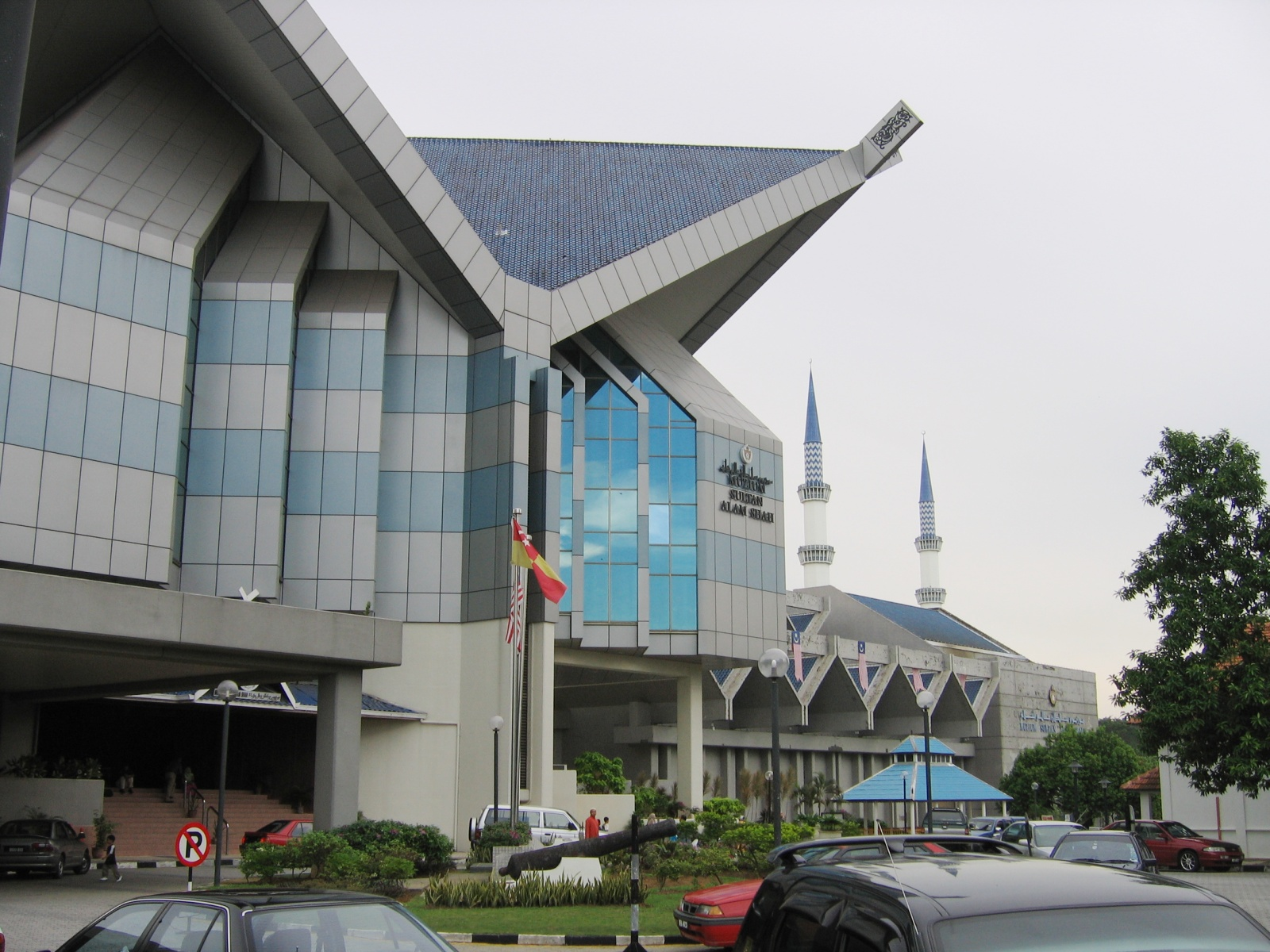
- From top, left to right: The Sultan Salahuddin Abdul Aziz Mosque, i-City, Shah Alam Square, the Shah Alam Royale Theatre, and the Sultan Alam Shah Museum

- Flag Seal
- Nicknames: Bandar Anggerik; Orchid City
- Motto: Indah Bestari; Beautiful, Brilliant
- Location of Shah Alam in Selangor
- Shah Alam in Selangor Shah Alam (Peninsular Malaysia) Shah Alam (Malaysia) Shah Alam (Southeast Asia) Shah Alam (Asia)
- Coordinates: 03°04′20″N 101°31′00″E
- Country: Malaysia
- State: Selangor
- District: Petaling and Klang
- Establishment: 1974
- State capital status: 7 December 1978
- Municipality status: 1 January 1979
- City status: 10 October 2000; 26 years ago

Government
  - Type: City council
  - Body: Shah Alam City Council
  - Mayor: Datuk Mohd Fauzi Mohd Yatim

Area
  - Total: 290.3 km^{2} (112.1 sq mi)

Population (2017)
  - Total: 740,750
  - Rank: 6th in Malaysia
  - Density: 2,552/km^{2} (6,609/sq mi)
- Time zone: UTC+8 (MST)
  - Summer (DST): Not observed
- Postal code: 40xxx, 47xxx
- Area code: +60(3)
- Website: www.mbsa.gov.my

Shah Alam (/ʃɑː ˈɑːləm/, Malaysian: [ʃah ˈalam], from Persian, meaning "king of the world") is a city and the state capital of Selangor, Malaysia which is situated within the Petaling District and a small portion of the neighbouring Klang District. Shah Alam replaced Kuala Lumpur as the capital city of the state of Selangor in 1978 due to Kuala Lumpur's incorporation into a Federal Territory in 1974. Shah Alam was the first planned city in Malaysia after independence from Britain in 1957.

== History ==
Expansion of Shah Alam's municipal borders since gazettement as state capital in 1978.

Malaysia grew rapidly after its independence in 1957 under its second Prime Minister, Tun Abdul Razak Hussein. Shah Alam was once known as Sungai Renggam and was noted for its rubber and oil palm estates. Later, the same area was identified as Batu Tiga prior to Malaysian independence, and has been a centre of rubber and palm oil trade for many years. The Sungai Renggam Plantation was earmarked for the development of a township by the Selangor government in 1973, and under the recommendations of Vlado Antolic, a town planning advisor from the United Nations, chose the present site strategically located between Kuala Lumpur and Port Klang.

Its current name was chosen by the then state Sultan of Selangor, Sultan Salahuddin Abdul Aziz Shah, after his late father Sultan Alam Shah. Many other monuments, buildings and even a street are named after the late Sultan. Shah Alam was opened in 1974 with the purpose of making it the new administrative centre of Selangor, replacing Kuala Lumpur which was made a Federal Territory on 1 February 1974. With the consent of the Sultan, Shah Alam was proclaimed the capital of Selangor on 7 December 1978 with an initial area of 41.68 km^{2}, and administered by a municipal council.

=== Enlargement ===
Shah Alam was enlarged several times between 1983 and 1997, the last annexation on 1 January 1997:

- 1983: Annexed Section 25-28 (Sri Muda) from Petaling District Council; 11.41 km^{2} annexed
- 1994: Annexed Setia Alam, Bukit Jelutong and Subang Airport from Petaling District Council, and Kota Kemuning and Sungai Kandis from Klang Municipal Council; 208.6 km^{2} annexed
- 1997: Annexed Paya Jaras and parts of Sungai Buloh from Petaling District Council, but ceded Putra Heights and Subang Hi-tech Industrial Park to Subang Jaya; 28.6 km^{2} annexed

Through the Gazette Plan 1190, Shah Alam was extended to its present-day area of 293 km^{2}.

=== City status ===
Shah Alam was granted city status on 10 October 2000 with Dato' Haji Abu Sujak Haji Mahmud as the first mayor. He recently served as deputy Menteri Besar or Deputy Chief Minister of Selangor. Abu Sujak declared the vision of making Shah Alam a modern city with a unique identity of a Bandaraya Melayu ("Malay City"), showcasing the achievements of the Malay race in all sectors.

== Geography ==
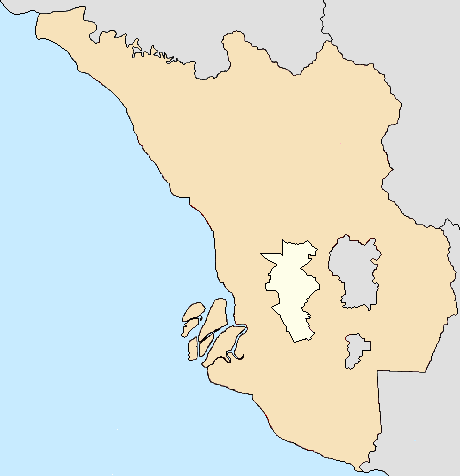
Locations of Shah Alam and its suburbs

Shah Alam is located within the district of Petaling and a portion of the district of Klang in the state of Selangor with total area 290.3 km^{2}. Due to its recent expansion, it is bordered by the cities of Subang Jaya and Petaling Jaya in the east, the district of Klang in the west, the district of Kuala Selangor and Selayang in the north, and the district of Kuala Langat in the south. Shah Alam is also one of the major cities within the Klang Valley, an area in Malaysia comprising Kuala Lumpur and its suburbs, and adjoining cities and towns in the state of Selangor, due to the Klang River flowing through it on its way westward to the Strait of Malacca.

Located in Klang Valley, Shah Alam topography is mostly flat, except in the northern part of the city where it features a prominent rolling hill.

=== Cityscape ===
Shah Alam city sections

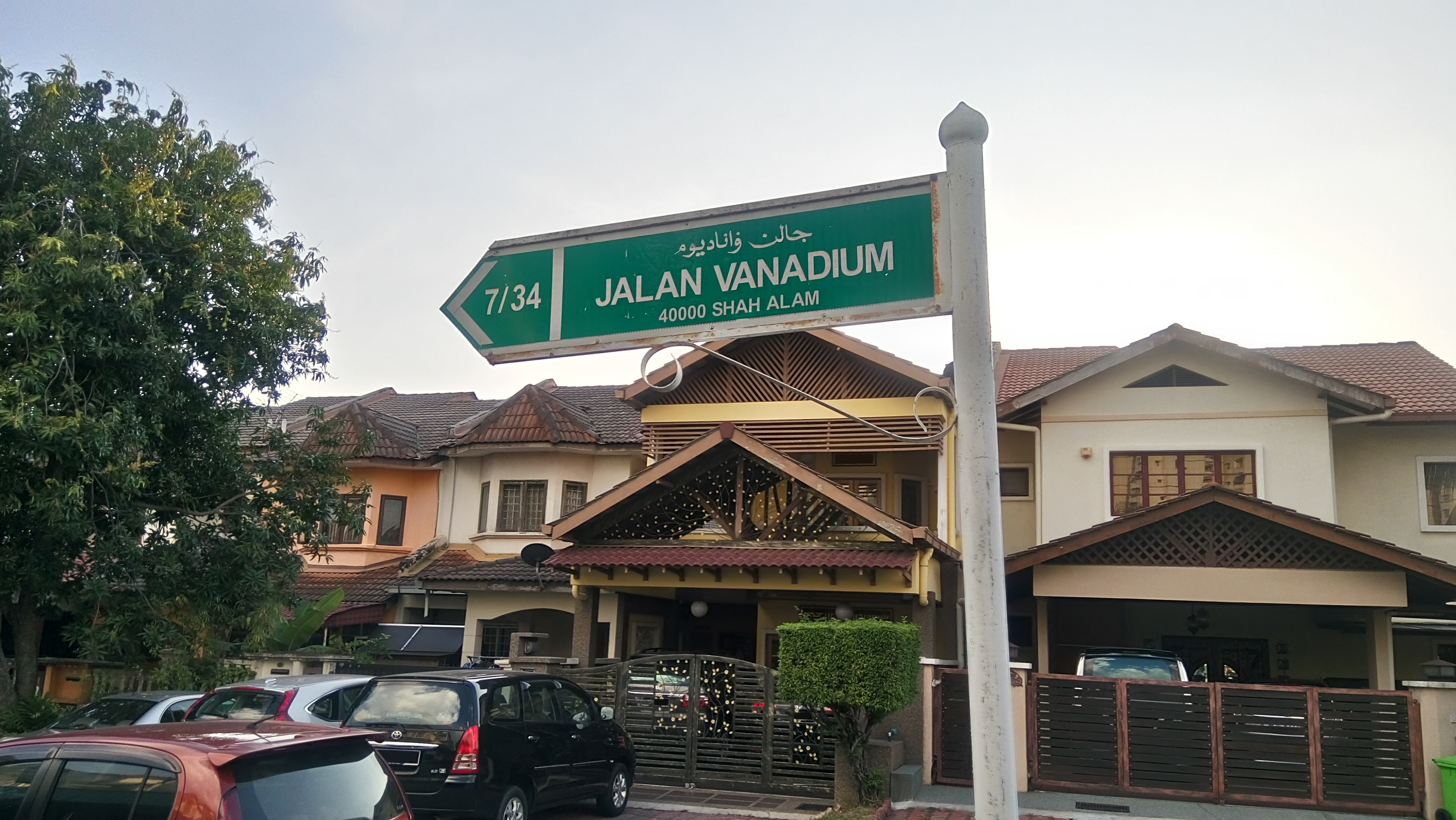
Street name in Shah Alam have signs in both Roman and Jawi script.

Shah Alam has a similar urban layout to Petaling Jaya or Subang Jaya with housing areas occupying most of the city (55.2 km^{2}) and commercial centres scattered around the different 'Seksyen' (sections). There are 56 sections in total. Generally Shah Alam can be divided into three parts; the north, central and south parts. North Shah Alam consists of 18 Sections including Sections U1 and U2 and Kampung Melayu Subang. The Central Shah Alam is where all the state administrative buildings and agencies are situated. It consists of Section 1 until Section 24 (seen in the map as beige coloured areas). South Shah Alam consists of 12 sections including Section 25 (Sri Muda), Section 30 (Jalan Kebun), Section 31 (Kota Kemuning) and Section 32 (Bukit Rimau). In the map, south Shah Alam is seen as the light purple coloured areas.

The city has a number of shopping malls (Aeon Shah Alam Seksyen 13, Plaza Alam Sentral, (also known as PAS or older name is Kota Francais), SACC Mall, Plaza Shah Alam (formerly known as Shah Alam Mall, also known as Plaza Masalam), Ole-Ole Seksyen 18, Central i-City Mall, Anggerik Mall and Kompleks PKNS). Vibrant commercial areas are situated mostly at the city centre (Seksyen 14), Seksyen 13 and Seksyen 9.

All of the main roads and streets in Shah Alam including the new townships such as Setia Alam and Kota Kemuning have signs with their names shown in both Roman and Jawi scripts.

=== Climate ===
As with other cities across Peninsular Malaysia, Shah Alam experiences a tropical rainforest climate (Köppen climate classification Af). Temperatures are consistent throughout the year with an average high temperature of 31.9 °C and an average low temperature of 23.2 °C. The city is warmest in the month of March, and experiences heavy rains and showers during the month of November as the northeast monsoon moves in from October to March. Overall the climate is fairly humid.

Climate data for Klang, Malaysia (Approximation 7km distance from Shah Alam)
Month	Jan	Feb	Mar	Apr	May	Jun	Jul	Aug	Sep	Oct	Nov	Dec	Year
Mean daily maximum °C (°F)	32 (90)	32 (90)	33 (91)	32 (90)	32 (90)	32 (90)	32 (90)	32 (90)	32 (90)	32 (90)	31 (88)	31 (88)	32 (90)
Daily mean °C (°F)	27 (81)	28 (82)	28 (82)	28 (82)	28 (82)	28 (82)	28 (82)	28 (82)	28 (82)	28 (82)	27 (81)	27 (81)	28 (82)
Mean daily minimum °C (°F)	23 (73)	23 (73)	23 (73)	24 (75)	24 (75)	23 (73)	23 (73)	23 (73)	23 (73)	23 (73)	23 (73)	23 (73)	23 (73)
Average precipitation mm (inches)	162.6 (6.40)	170.2 (6.70)	231.1 (9.10)	276.9 (10.90)	195.6 (7.70)	124.5 (4.90)	127.0 (5.00)	142.2 (5.60)	195.6 (7.70)	266.7 (10.50)	281.9 (11.10)	228.6 (9.00)	2,402.9 (94.6)
Source: The Weather Channel Forecasts

== Governance ==
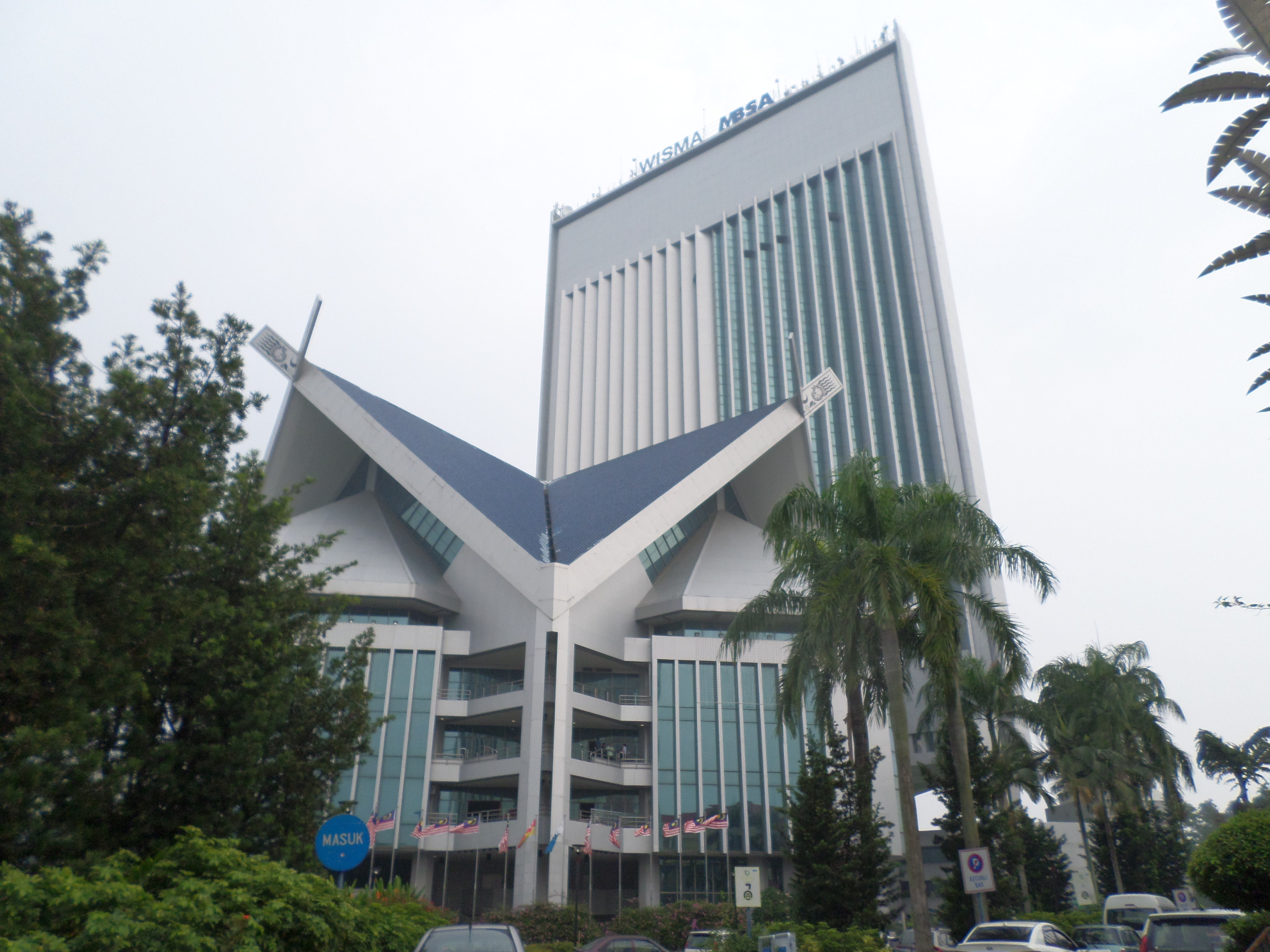
Shah Alam City Council

The Selangor state government's decision to develop the present land into a township saw the formation of the Shah Alam Town Board, a body governed by the Perbadanan Kemajuan Negeri Selangor (PKNS) or Selangor State Development Corporation in 1963. With the declaration of Shah Alam as the state capital by the Sultan of Selangor at the time, the Majlis Perbandaran Shah Alam (MPSA) or Shah Alam Municipal Council was formed in accordance to the Local Government Act 1976.

=== Local government ===
Shah Alam is presently administered by Shah Alam City Council (Malay: Majlis Bandaraya Shah Alam) (MBSA), which is an agency under the Selangor state government. It was founded as Shah Alam Municipal Council (Malay: Majlis Perbandaran Shah Alam) (MPSA) at the same time Shah Alam was declared the capital city of Selangor. Operating from a shophouse in Section 3, the council began operations on 1 January 1979 before moving twice; first to the Kompleks PKNS building on 1981 and later to a newly built 28-storey building called Wisma MPSA on 1988. With the declaration of Shah Alam's city status on 10 October 2000, the agency was upgraded into a city council. Since then, nine mayors have been appointed, with the latest being Mohd Fauzi Yatim since 2024.

=== Politics ===
Within the Dewan Rakyat, the parliamentary constituencies of Sungai Buloh (P107) is represented by Ramanan Ramakrishnan; while Shah Alam (P108) is represented by Azli Yusof, both from Pakatan Harapan, one represents PKR and the latter is from the AMANAH party. While the southern part of the city, Kota Raja (P111) is represented by Mohamad Sabu of the Pakatan Harapan (PH), also from AMANAH.

== Economy ==
Shah Alam economy consists of government-related for the state government as it's the capital of Selangor, outside of government, Shah Alam major economy are mostly in the manufacturing sector followed by services.

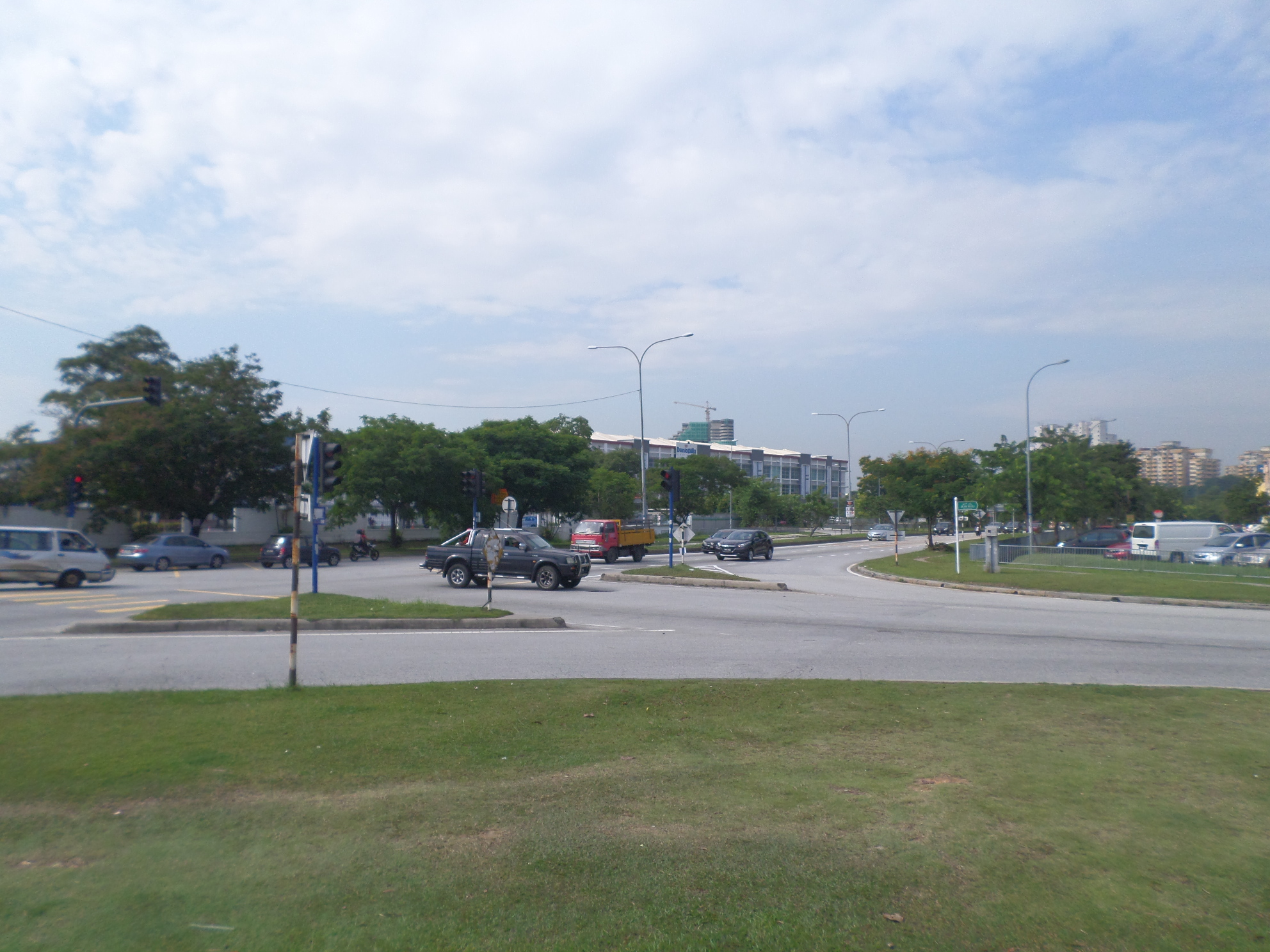
Bukit Raja Selatan Industrial Area

The Malaysian supermarket chain Giant Hypermarket is headquartered at the Giant Hypermarket Shah Alam Stadium in Shah Alam.

Manufacturing plays a big role in Shah Alam economy, it predates Shah Alam existence, most of them are concentrated in the Batu Tiga area and Seksyen 26, 27, and 28. Major plant include CSR Sugar Refinery, Fraser and Neave, Panasonic-Matsushita and more.

Shah Alam also features few automotive industry operation, most notably Volvo being the first and the oldest surviving automobile assembly plant in Malaysia. Proton was founded in Shah Alam and has it headquarters here. PROTON still operates their Shah Alam assembly plant despite having built a bigger assembly plant in Tanjung Malim, Perak. Toyota (under UMW) has an assembly plant here as well.

== Education ==
The Universiti Teknologi MARA (UiTM, formerly known until 1996 as Institut Teknologi MARA or ITM) is located nearby the state capital. The whole university area occupies an entire section on the western hills of the city known as Seksyen 1. At Seksyen 17, there is also a branch campus of UiTM called INTEC UiTM (International Education College), where its students undergo preparation programmes for overseas studies. INTEC UiTM is the only UiTM campus where non-bumiputra students are accepted for admission.

Other institutions of higher learning in Shah Alam include University of Selangor, Management and Science University (MSU), and its affiliate college, MSU College, Shah Alam also has several industrial-related education centres namely Shah Alam Polytechnic (or Politeknik Sultan Salahuddin Abdul Aziz Shah), CIAST, and ADTEC.

Shah Alam is also served by many primary and secondary schools such as SK Bukit Rimau and SMK Kota Kemuning. In some cases, the maximum capacity of students enrolled in schools exceeds the number of potential students in the residential areas. For example, in Taman Alam Megah, Taman Bunga Negara, and Taman Bukit Saga, which are situated in Section 27 and Section 28, there are three secondary schools and seven primary schools. In contrast, in Section 16 and 17, the only secondary school there is Sekolah Menengah Kebangsaan Seksyen 16. Currently, Shah Alam has 23 secondary schools, 1 technical school, 1 vocational school, and 37 primary schools. The SMJK Chung Hwa is the only national-type secondary school within the city.

Chinese Taipei International School (Kuala Lumpur) is situated in Section 32, Shah Alam.

== Transportation ==
Terminal 17 Bus Station

Shah Alam Komuter station

Shah Alam is well connected to other main cities in Klang Valley via a network of major highways, namely the Federal Highway, New Klang Valley Expressway (NKVE), Shah Alam Expressway (KESAS), Guthrie Corridor Expressway (GCE), North–South Expressway Central Link (ELITE), Setiawangsa Pantai Expressway (SPE) and Kemuning–Shah Alam Highway (LKSA). Highways also connect the city to two major airports. The Kuala Lumpur International Airport (KLIA) located 30 km south of the city serves international flights and is connected via the ELITE highway, while the Sultan Abdul Aziz Shah Airport in Subang caters to domestic flights and is connected via the Federal Highway. Major roads within the city are connected via roundabouts that divide the city into different Sections. Each Section contain a network of local roads named according to a chosen theme; for example, Section 20's roads are named after animals. Shah Alam is also notable for being the only city in Malaysia to have its own route numbering for the road in the city.

The KTM Komuter commuter train service provides for residents who use public transportation to other major cities, connecting Shah Alam via the Tanjong Malim–Port Klang Route. This route stops at three stations within Shah Alam: the Shah Alam Komuter station situated at the southern part of the city in Section 19, the Padang Jawa Komuter station at Section 17 and the Sungai Buloh Komuter station at Section U20. Another KTM Komuter station located at the outskirts of Shah Alam is the Batu Tiga Komuter station situated near UEP Subang Jaya in Batu Tiga. Residents would then transfer to different routes at the KL Sentral station and Subang Jaya station which provides interchange station with LRT Kelana Jaya Line.

Shah Alam is also served by Prasarana's LRT Shah Alam Line, LRT Kelana Jaya Line, and MRT Kajang Line. The LRT Shah Alam Line provides rapid transit access for Shah Alam residents, with stations ranging from Seksyen 7 Shah Alam to Glenmarie 2, which interchanges with the Kelana Jaya LRT Line at Glenmarie. The Kelana Jaya LRT Line also serves Shah Alam via Glenmarie, as well as Taman Alam Megah through Alam Megah LRT station and Subang Alam LRT station. The MRT Kajang Line serves the north-eastern part of the Shah Alam local government area, with stations at Kwasa Damansara via Kwasa Damansara MRT station and Kwasa Sentral MRT station, as well as Sungai Buloh via Kampung Selamat MRT station and Sungai Buloh MRT station.

Buses and taxis provide public transport in commercial areas in the city. A bus and taxi hub is located at Section 17, providing offices for several mini buses, express buses and taxi companies as well as rental car services. This hub also provides for passengers that travel on express bus services to major cities throughout Peninsular Malaysia.

There is a bus service Smart Selangor Bus which is free for Malaysian citizen and charge 90 cent for foreigner each trip. Some of the routes are gateway to MRT and LRT sation.

== Healthcare ==
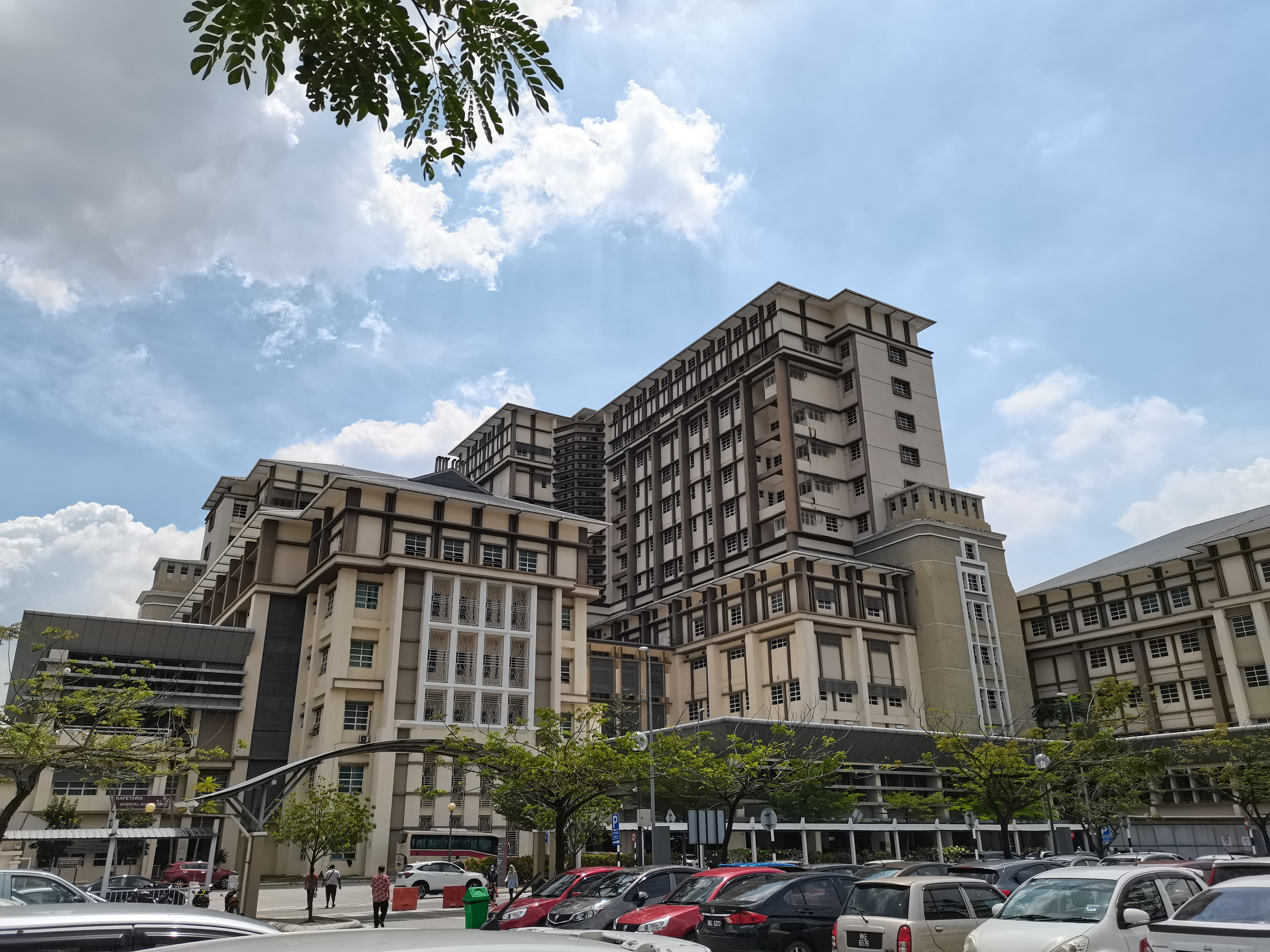
The Shah Alam Hospital main building.

Shah Alam is served with many private clinics that exist in every part and residential parks in the city. The main government-owned clinic, on the other hand, is located in Section 7 and known as Klinik Kesihatan Shah Alam (Shah Alam Health Clinic). Another government-owned clinic is located in Section 19.

A government-owned hospital; Shah Alam Hospital was opened on 5 October 2015 after a four-year delay. The hospital costs MYR 565 million and will also be used as a teaching hospital for undergraduate and post-graduate medical students. It is located beside the government-owned clinic in Section 7.

There are seven private hospitals in Shah Alam: KPJ Selangor Specialist Hospital, Salam Shah Alam Specialist Hospital, Avisena Specialist Hospital, Avisena Women's & Children's Specialist Hospital, Hospital Umra, Columbia Asia Extended Care Hospital, and Columbia Asia Bukit Rimau.

== Culture ==
=== Demographics ===
As of 2023, the city has a population of 438,745. The following ethnic group composition is based on the Department of Statistics Malaysia's 2020 census.

Ethnic groups in Shah Alam
Ethnicity	Population	Percentage
Bumiputera	326,865	74.5%
Chinese	74,587	17.0%
Indian	35,100	8.0%
Others	2,193	0.5%

=== Religion ===
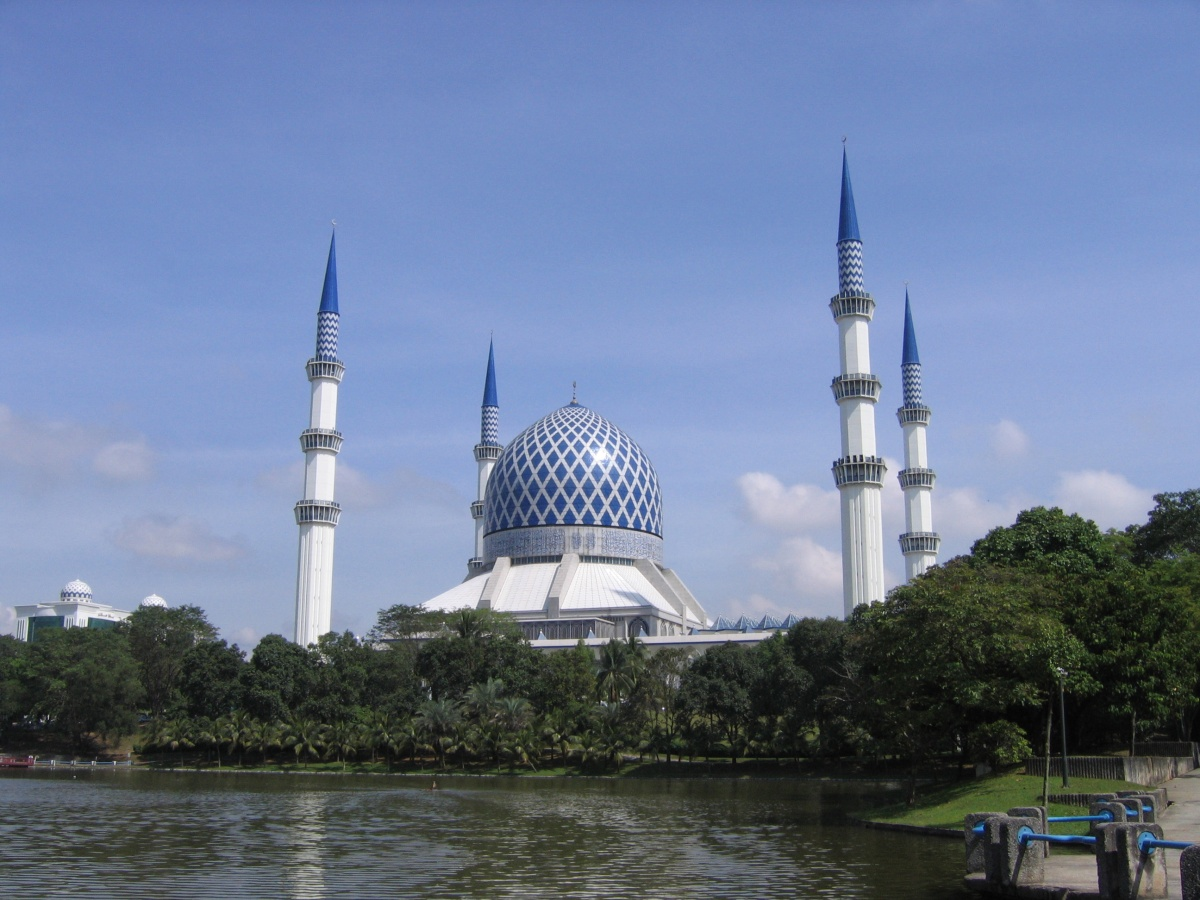
Sultan Salahuddin Abdul Aziz Mosque

Shah Alam is most famous for its mosque, the Sultan Salahuddin Abdul Aziz Mosque. It is also known as the Blue Mosque and has been claimed to be the largest mosque in Malaysia, and one of the largest in Southeast Asia. The mosque has the capacity to accommodate 24,000 worshippers at one time. Its distinguishing feature is its large blue and silver dome, which measures 51.2 m (167 ft) in diameter and reaches 106.7 m (350 ft) above ground level. The mosque has four minarets erected at the corners, each minaret is 142.3 m (460 ft) tall. The mosque was commissioned by the late Sultan Salahuddin Abdul Aziz when he declared Shah Alam as the new capital of Selangor on 14 February 1974. Construction of the mosque was completed on 11 March 1988. As the capital of Selangor, Islam is the religion preferred by a majority of Shah Alam residents.

Buddhist Missionary Society Malaysia (BMSM)'s Samadhi Vihara is distinct with its iconic lotus-top Shrine Hall. Since its completion in 2012, Samadhi Vihara serves a premier Dhammaduta centre for Buddhists in the south western part of Klang Valley. It is a landmark development at Section U12, Bukit Raja, Shah Alam. As the only Theravadin-based Vihara (Buddhist Temple) in the vicinity of Klang and Shah Alam, it has grown in popularity with its regular Dhamma programme and activities.

=== Tourism ===
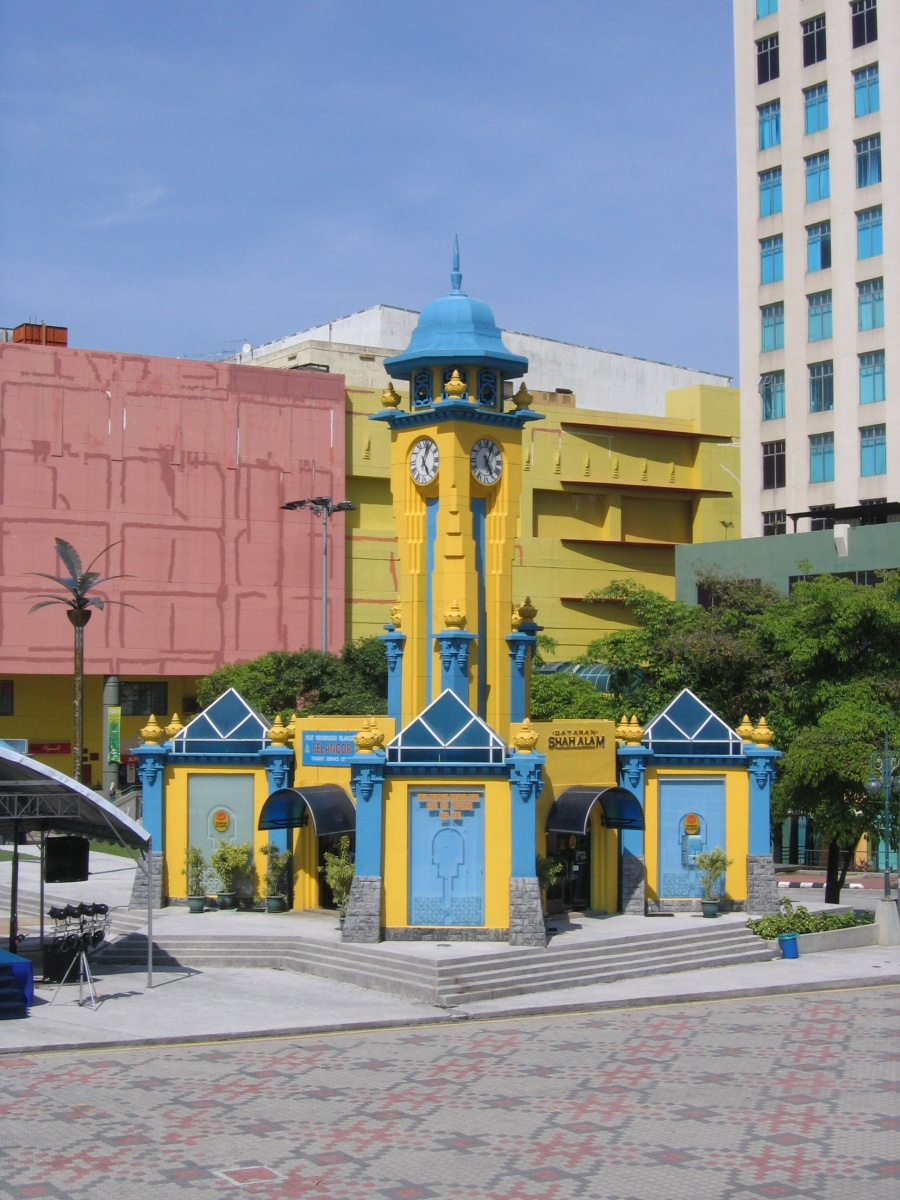
SA Tourist Service Centre

Garden of Islamic Arts

The Blue Mosque overlooks the Garden of Islamic Arts, a landscaped park inspired by the Quranic Garden of Paradise. This 14 hectares of spiritual sanctuary houses nine galleries exhibiting a rich array of Islamic arts such as calligraphy, sculptures, paintings and architecture. The site is occasionally used for traditional Islamic performances.

Sultan Alam Shah Museum (Selangor State Museum)

The Selangor State Museum (Sultan Alam Shah Museum) displays many treasures and artefacts related to the history of Selangor. Adjacent to the museum is the former Selangor State Library (Perpustakaan Raja Tun Uda). The Selangor Islamic Arts Complex (Kompleks Kesenian Islam Selangor or Riyadh Fannil Islam) is situated nearby, housing many Islamic masterpieces and creativities such as a variety of Islamic calligraphy, known as khat, and a number of precious treasures. An Islamic Art College is located within the Complex. At the banks of the Lake Gardens, an art gallery and performance centre called Laman Budaya is located, where exhibitions and shows regularly take place.

The city is surrounded by many parks and gardens, such as the Shah Alam Lake Gardens (developed around seven artificial lakes), the Shah Alam National Botanical Park and the Kota Kemuning Lakeside Park situated in Kota Kemuning.

i-City Shah Alam

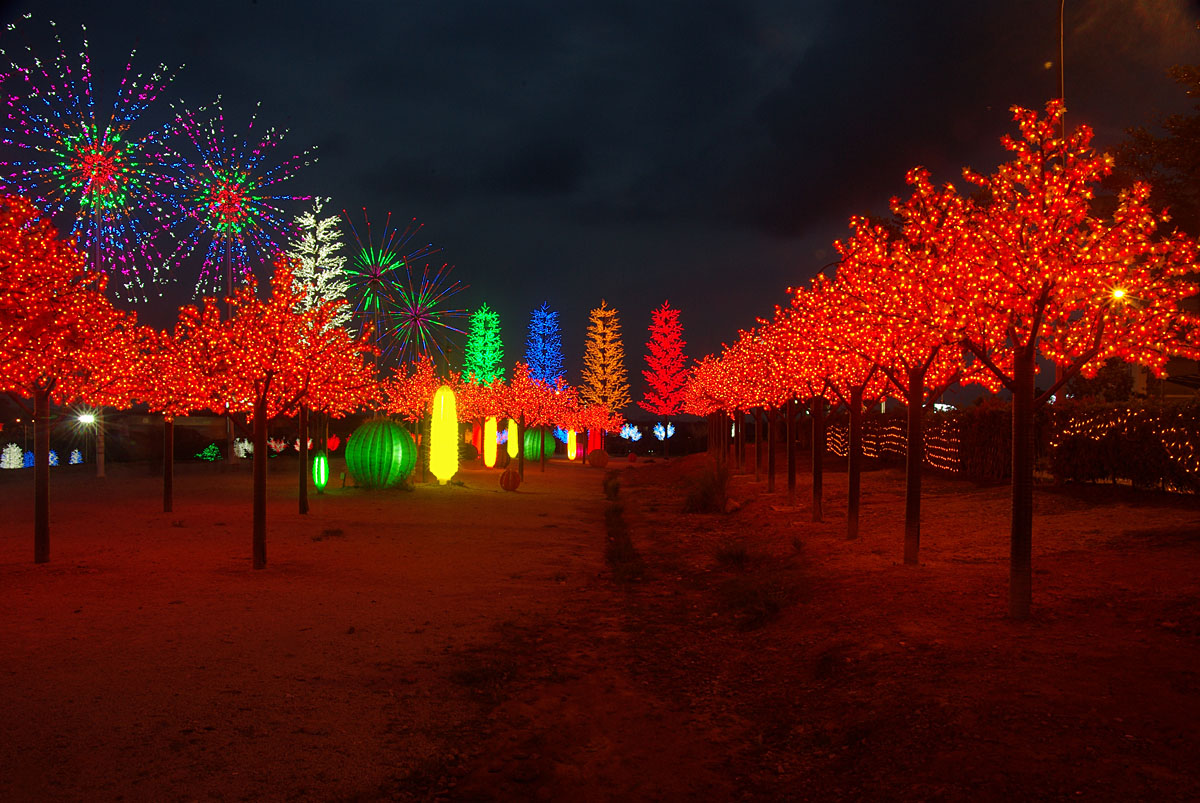
i-City, City of Digital Lights

Situated within the 72-acres urban development area in Section 7 Shah Alam, i-City is one of the first places to offer lively LED lighting decorations in Malaysia at night. In addition to lighting decorations, there is also a water theme park, a 3D museum, a Ferris Wheel, and a Snowwalk. It is also one of the main attractions for taking photos.

=== Sports ===
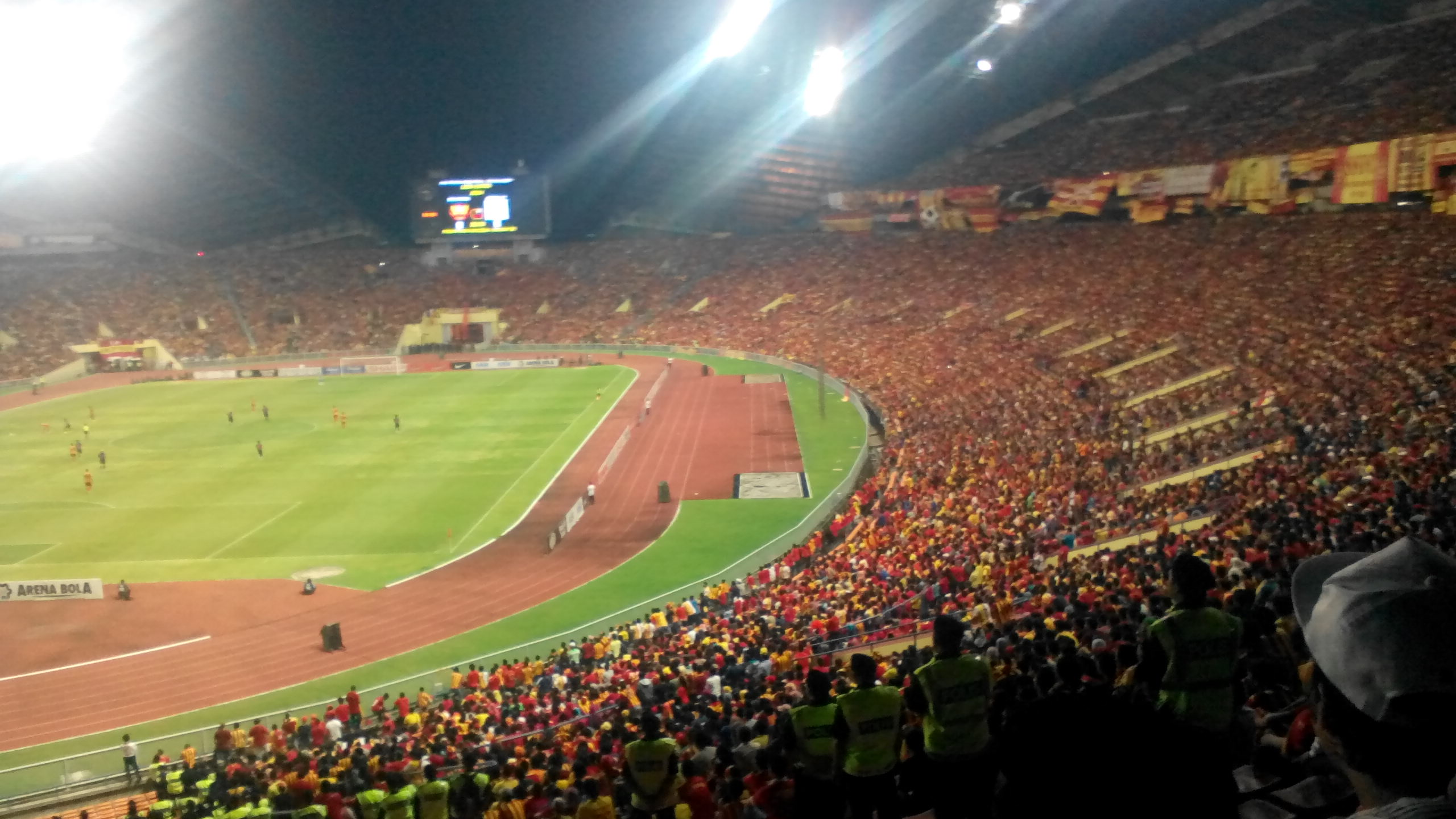
Shah Alam Stadium

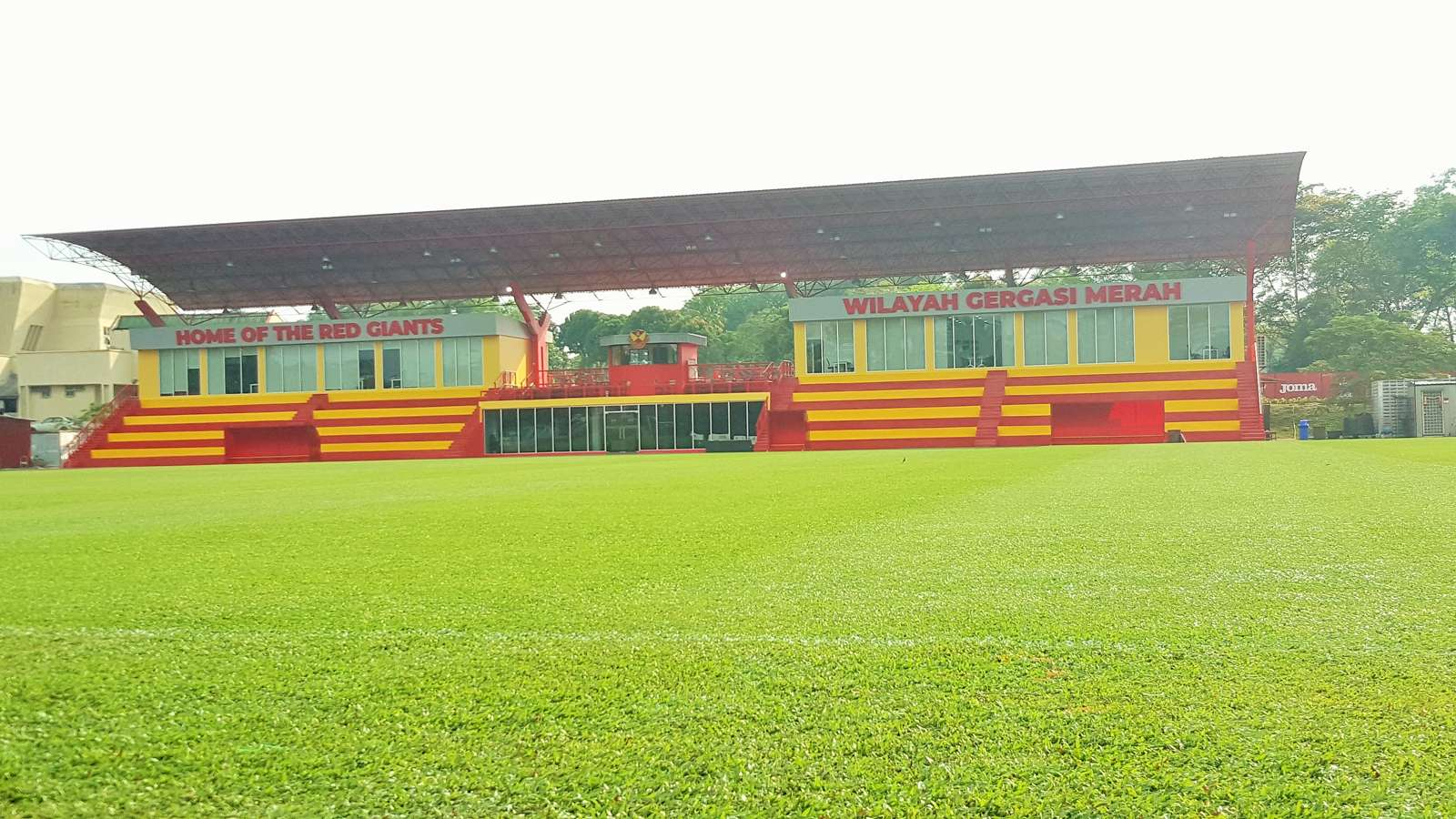
Selangor F.C. Training Centre, located at SUK Sports Complex, Section 5, Shah Alam.

Shah Alam has a fully equipped sports complex known as Kompleks Sukan Shah Alam or Shah Alam Sports Complex.

Among the facilities located within the Complex was the gigantic Stadium Shah Alam or Shah Alam Stadium. Shah Alam Stadium was the home of Selangor F.C. Shah Alam Stadium was the biggest stadium in Malaysia with 80,000 seats prior to the construction of the National Stadium, Bukit Jalil which could accommodate up to 100,000 spectators. Shah Alam Stadium was featured in a challenge in the first leg of The Amazing Race Asia Season 1 where teams had to ride go-karts around the circuit.

In September 2016, a group of 7 men who are professionals in their own fields in football came together and formed Shah Alam Antlers F.C. (nickname Shah Alam Antlers or SAAFC). The club was formed as the founders were tired of the current football league system in Malaysia and wanted a revolution in a system that is old, unprofessional and politically corrupt. The current board also wants a club that puts the people of Shah Alam as their priority. SAAFC is currently playing their home games at the Panasonic Stadium in Seksyen 21, Shah Alam. They are currently participating in the Klang Valley League and will be hoping to climb up the ranks. Although newly formed, SAAFC already has a club membership program for their fans, a feat most 'professional' clubs in the Malaysian League do not have. The club's motto is "All Unite For The City".

Apart from passed Stadium Shah Alam, there is Stadium Melawati or the Melawati Stadium, an indoor stadium that could accommodate 40,000 people in one time. Besides sports matches, this stadium had been used for several occasions such as the final concert of Akademi Fantasia and the Perhimpunan Pekerja 2008 held by the Dewan Pemuda PAS. The grandest occasion ever held in this stadium was the boxing finals of the 1998 Commonwealth Games which saw Malaysian Sapok Biki winning a gold medal.

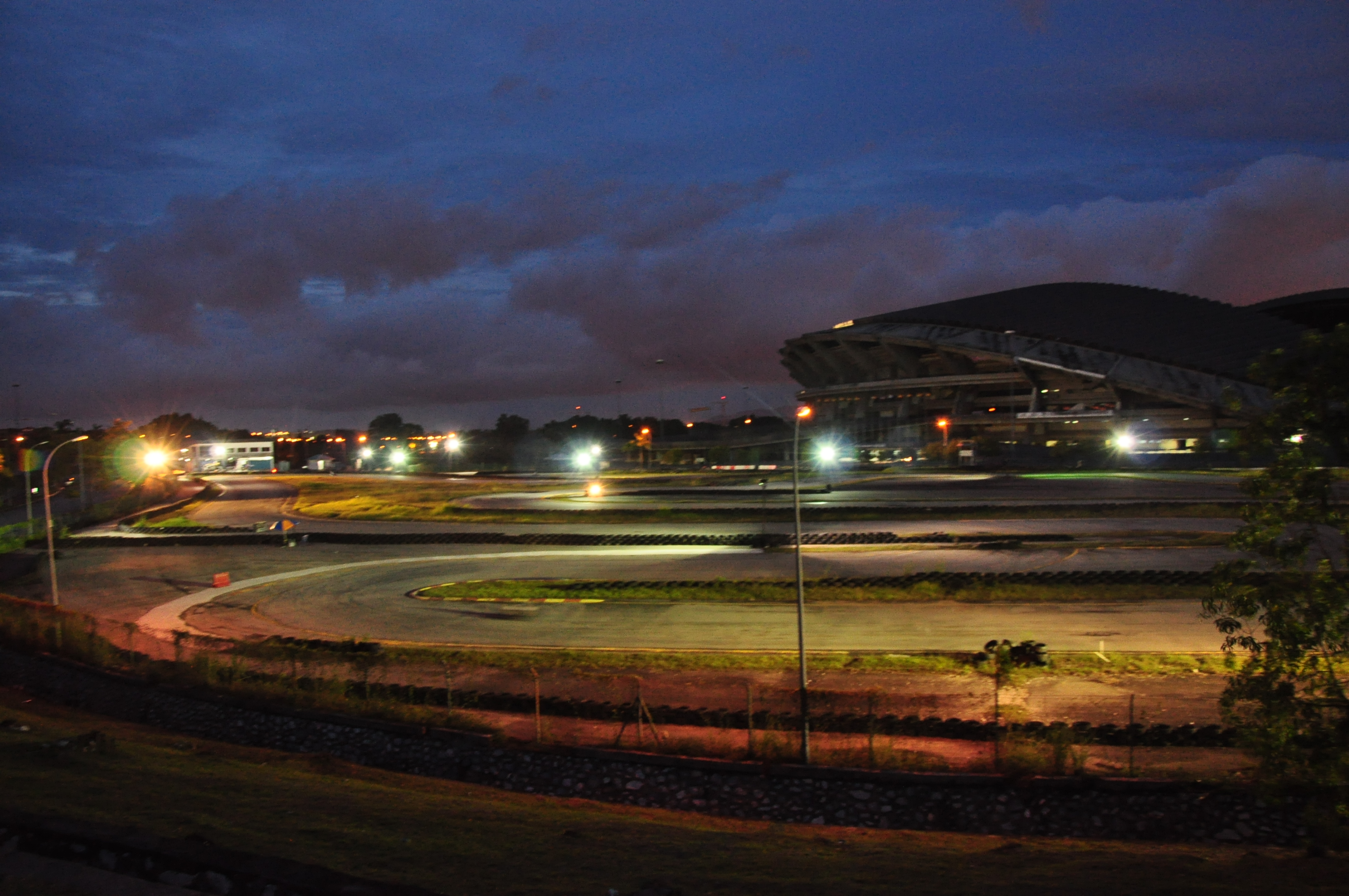
Shah Alam go-kart circuit

The Shah Alam Sports Complex also includes the Pusat Akuatik Darul Ehsan or the Darul Ehsan Aquatic Centre, a Go-Kart track located within the Stadium Shah Alam parking compound, as well as the Shah Alam Extreme Park located in Section 13.

Shah Alam hosted 2 events for the 1998 Commonwealth Games, road cycling and boxing.

=== Recreation ===
SACC Mall

Uptown Shah Alam

Uptown Shah Alam is located in Section 24 near the LKSA highway. It is more than just a flea market, there are food stalls and events such as concert and games every now and then.

Bon Odori

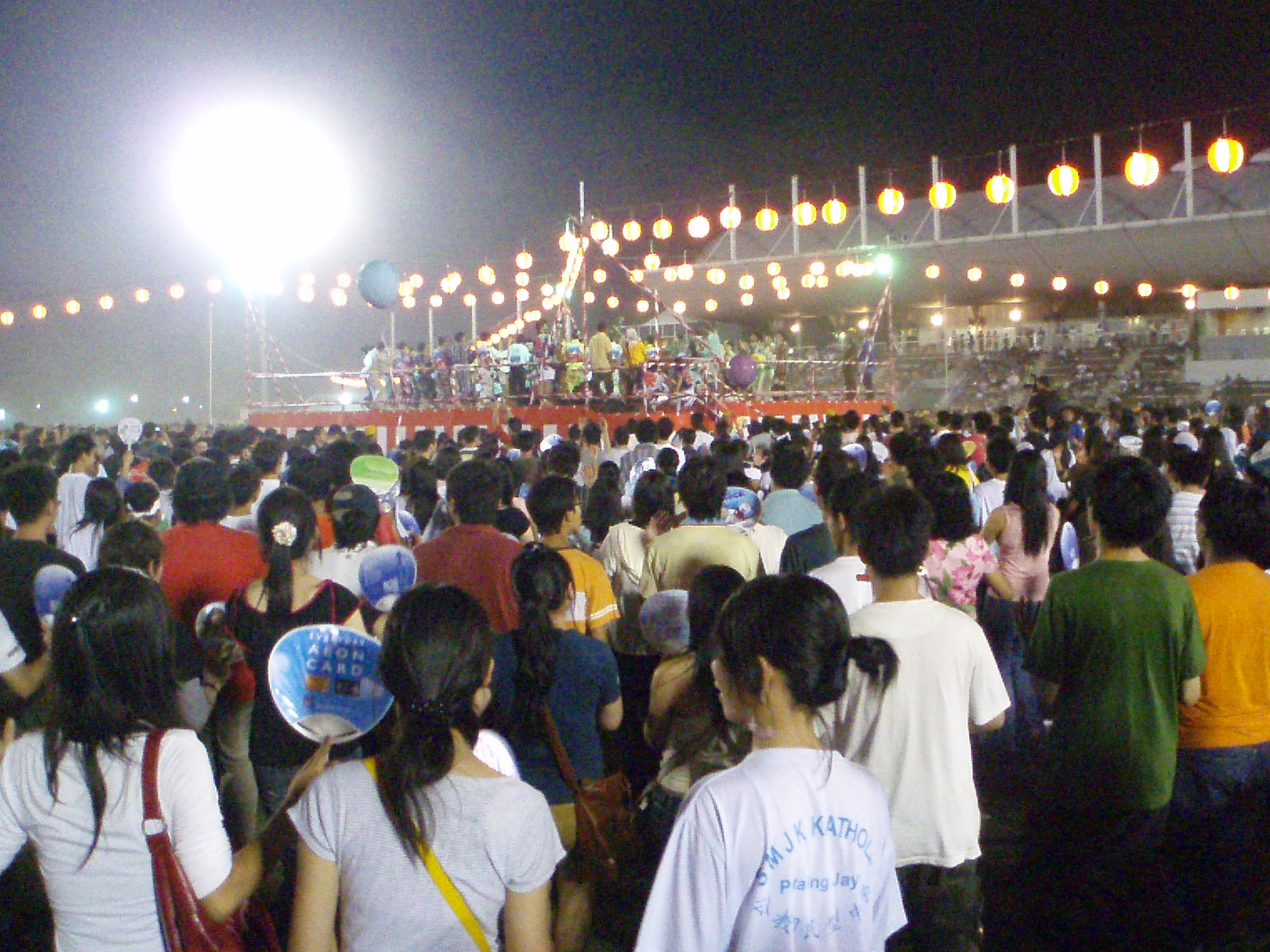
Bon Odori 2009

Bon Odori is a yearly event held during Obon. It is celebrated as Japanese Buddhist custom to honour the departed (deceased) spirits of one's ancestors. In Malaysia, Bon Odori festivals are also celebrated in a smaller scale every year in Penang and at the Panasonic Sports Complex in Section 21, Shah Alam, Selangor. Held mainly to expose locals to a part of Japanese culture, the festival provides the experience of a variety of Japanese food & drinks, art and dance. Celebrations in Malaysia, especially in the cities, tend to be more oriented towards culture than to its religious origins. Admission is free and this event is organised by The Japan Club of Kuala Lumpur, The Japanese School of Kuala Lumpur and The Embassy of Japan.

Wet World

Wet World is known as Malaysia's largest water theme park chain. It has three venues in Malaysia, strategically located at Wet World Shah Alam, Selangor; Wet World Batu Pahat, Johor; and Wet World Air Panas, Pedas, Negeri Sembilan.

Shah Alam Lake Garden, Section 14

The Shah Alam Lake Garden (Malay: Taman Tasik Shah Alam) is a 43-hectares public recreation lake garden that is located in Section 14. Designed by a renowned landscape architect Fumiaki Takano, it was Selangor's first public park when it was opened in 1985. The lake consists of 3 man-made lakes (Central, West and East), each with its own unique features and characteristics. Several species of animals including peacocks, geese, storks and forest chickens are also reared at the lake.

The lake garden is a major attraction in the city and it is equipped with gazebos, a lakeside promenade, raised walkways that extend over the water, reflexology paths, jogging and cycling trails, event halls and children's playgrounds. In addition, there is a floating seafood restaurant, meandering footpaths and plenty of recreational water activities for families.

== International relations ==
=== Sister cities ===
Shah Alam currently has two sister cities:

Surabaya, East Java, Indonesia.	Hanam, Gyeonggi-do, South Korea.

== See also ==
- Shah Alam Transfer Station

== Notes and references ==
Preceded by Klang	Capital of Selangor (1978–present)	Succeeded by present
