= Chief Secretary (Singapore) =

Government position in colonial Singapore

Chief Secretary of Singapore
- Coat of arms of the Straits Settlements
- Style: The Honourable
- Residence: Sri Temasek (1869–1959)
- Appointer: Governor of the Straits Settlements (1867–1942); Governor of Singapore (1946–1959)
- Term length: No fixed term
- Precursor: Colonial Secretary of the Straits Settlements; Colonial Secretary of Singapore
- Formation: 1867; 159 years ago
- First holder: Ronald MacPherson
- Final holder: Edgeworth Beresford David
- Abolished: 1959; 67 years ago

The chief secretary of Singapore, known as the colonial secretary of Singapore before 1955, and the colonial secretary of the Straits Settlements before 1946, was a high ranking government official position in the Straits Settlements before 1946 and the Colony of Singapore after 1946, between 1867 and 1959. It was second only to the governor of Singapore, formerly the governor of the Straits Settlements in the colonial government.

The Straits Settlements, which mainly comprised Singapore, Penang and Malacca, became a Crown colony in 1867. The position of Colonial Secretary was subsequently created with a view to replacing Resident Councillor in Singapore. During the Japanese occupation of Singapore, the position was vacant and suspended following the downfall of the Malay Peninsula into the hands of the Japanese Empire. In 1946, Singapore parted from Penang and Malacca, forming itself into a Crown colony, so the jurisdiction of Colonial Secretary was reduced to Singapore only.

The title "Colonial Secretary" was later changed to "Chief Secretary" in 1955 when the Crown colony adopted the Rendel Constitution. Having been in existence for 92 years, the position was abolished in 1959 after Singapore attained self-governance.

Being the head of the Colonial Secretary's Office, the colonial secretary was an ex-officio member of both the Executive and Legislative Council, and at the same time the head of the Colonial Secretariat between 1867 and 1955.

When Singapore adopted its new constitution in 1955, although the Colonial Secretariat was abolished, the chief secretary remained an ex-officio member of the Council of Ministers and the Legislative Assembly.

The workplace of Chief Secretary was located at Empress Place Building while Sri Temasek, which was next to the Government House, was the official residence of the chief secretary.

== History ==
=== Background of its creation ===
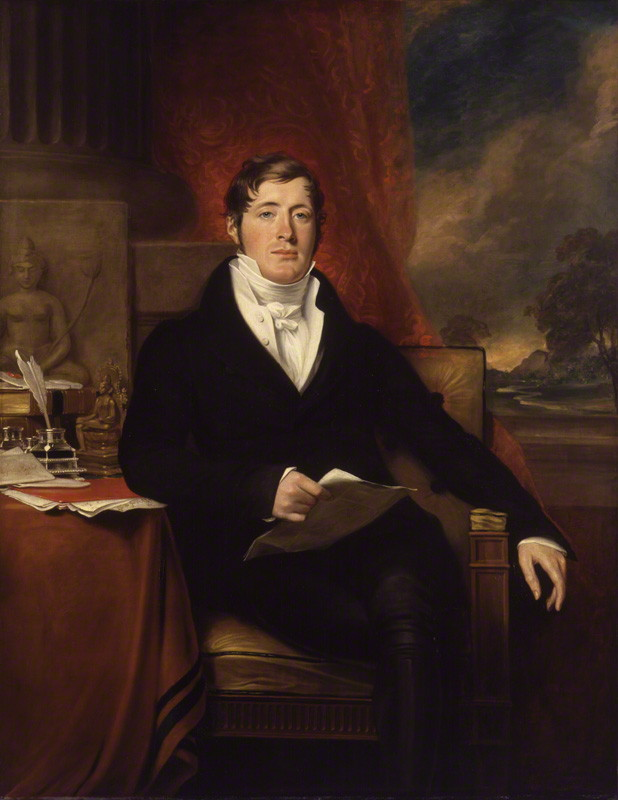
Portrait of Stamford Raffles by George Francis Joseph, 1817

In the context of the British Empire's outward expansion, the British East India Company (EIC) had gradually started to extend their influence to the Malay Peninsula as early as the late eighteenth century. In February 1819, Sir Stamford Raffles, EIC's Bengkulu Governor took the lead by establishing a trading settlement in Singapore; he appointed Resident of Malacca William Farquhar as the first Resident and Commandant of Singapore to administer its trade affairs, marking the prelude to the colonial history of Singapore. In 1826, the EIC established the Straits Settlements by centralising the administration of trading settlements in Singapore, Penang and Malacca for better efficiency. After the formation of the Straits Settlements, the post of the Resident in Singapore was restructured as Resident Councillor, who continued to be Singapore's highest-ranking official; The posts of Resident Councillor, Penang and Resident Councillor, Malacca were also created, while a holder of the newly created Governor of the Straits Settlements would be stationed in Penang.

Soon after, due to the rapid development of trade and the constant expansion of trading ports, the office of the Governor of the Straits Settlements was relocated from Penang to Singapore in 1832, thus replacing the Resident Councillor as the highest-ranking official in Singapore. When the Straits Settlements was established in 1826, it was administered under India as its Presidency; it was later administered as a Residency from 1830 to 1851, when it was directly under the Governor of India. However, the ultimate control over the Straits Settlements remained under EIC's Board of Directors in London.

The British Government took over the EIC's administrative powers over India in 1858 due to the Sepoy Mutiny and established direct rule in India. The Government of the Straits Settlements continued to be accountable to the Government of British India, while local Resident Councillors, originally employees of the EIC, were transited over to the colonial civil service. In 1867, the Colonial Office of the British Government decided to directly administer the Straits Settlements as a crown colony, with Colonel Ronald MacPherson, the last Resident Councillor of Singapore as the inaugural Colonial Secretary of the Straits Settlements.

=== Straits Settlements ===
Nineteen people served as the Colonial Secretary of the Straits Settlements from 1867 to 1942, excluding acting officials. Even though this position evolved from the post of Resident Councillor of Singapore, the nature of both differed. On one hand, the status of the Colonial Secretary was higher than that of the Resident Councillors in Penang and Malacca. On the other hand, the main duties of the Colonial Secretary was to oversee and coordinate administration, while that of the Resident Councillor of Singapore under the EIC's administration covered areas such as law enforcement, land use, vessels, postal services, custom affairs and municipal services. Therefore, the newly created position was similar to the Secretary to the Government of British India as well as the colonial secretaries or chief secretaries in other British colonies in terms of its nature. At that time, the Colonial Secretary was stationed in Singapore, the post was also known as the "Colonial Secretary of Singapore".

Flag of the Straits Settlements (1874–1925)

Flag of the Straits Settlements (1925–1946)

Sir Thomas Stamford Bingley Raffles

In July 1896, the British Government formed the Federated Malay States (FMS), which comprised Selangor, Negeri Sembilan, Perak and Pahang in the Malay Peninsula, with the Governor of the Straits Settlements concurrently as High Commissioner of the United Kingdom to Malaya. However, both the Governor and Colonial Secretary of the Straits Settlements were stationed in Singapore, so the Resident-General of the FMS (renamed Chief Secretary in 1911 and Federal Secretary in 1936) stationed in Kuala Lumpur was put in charge of the administration of the FMS. The responsibilities of the Resident-General of the FMS and the Colonial Secretary of the Straits Settlements did not overlap, but both were similar in nature; a resident was stationed in each of the states of the FMS, but the Resident-General of the FMS had to govern in his daily routine on behalf the High Commissioner. Hence, he held relatively more powers as compared with the Colonial Secretary of the Straits Settlements.

During Japan's invasion of Singapore in January 1942, the then-Colonial Secretary Stanley Jones was revoked from his position due to alleged ineffective defence coordination. The position was taken over temporarily by FMS Federal Secretary Hugh Fraser, who retreated to Singapore. Both Fraser and Sir Shenton Thomas, Governor of the Straits Settlements, stayed in Singapore until the last moment; they were imprisoned following the fall of Singapore to the Japanese. The post of Colonial Secretary was vacant due to the fall of Singapore. Following the unconditional surrender of Japan in 1945, the United Kingdom set up a provisional military government without restoring the post, so as to prepare for the dissolution of the Straits Settlements, in response to the post-war situation.

=== Evolution after World War II ===
Following the dissolution of the Straits Settlements, Singapore became a crown colony on 1 April 1946. Its Governor restored the civil government, while Penang and Malacca, previously part of the Straits Settlements, were incorporated into the newly formed Malayan Union. In view of this, the post of the Colonial Secretary of the Straits Settlements was renamed Colonial Secretary of Singapore, with Sir Patrick McKerron as the first to hold this post. After the Rendel Constitution took effect from February 1955, the post was renamed as Chief Secretary of Singapore, in response to the growing post-war self-governance movements in Singapore, and to the change in the functions and powers.

In the 1950s, constitutional amendments were made several times in preparation for self-governance in Singapore. In June 1959, the State of Singapore was established according to constitutional arrangements; under British suzerainty, the Governor was replaced by the Yang di-Pertuan Negara of Singapore while the position of Chief Secretary was abolished. E. B. David was the last person to hold this position in colonial Singapore. Since then, Singapore's governing powers fell into the hands of the newly created Prime Minister of Singapore and his cabinet. From 1946 to 1959, only four colonial officials held the post of Colonial Secretary or Chief Secretary in post-war Singapore.

== Major responsibilities and powers ==
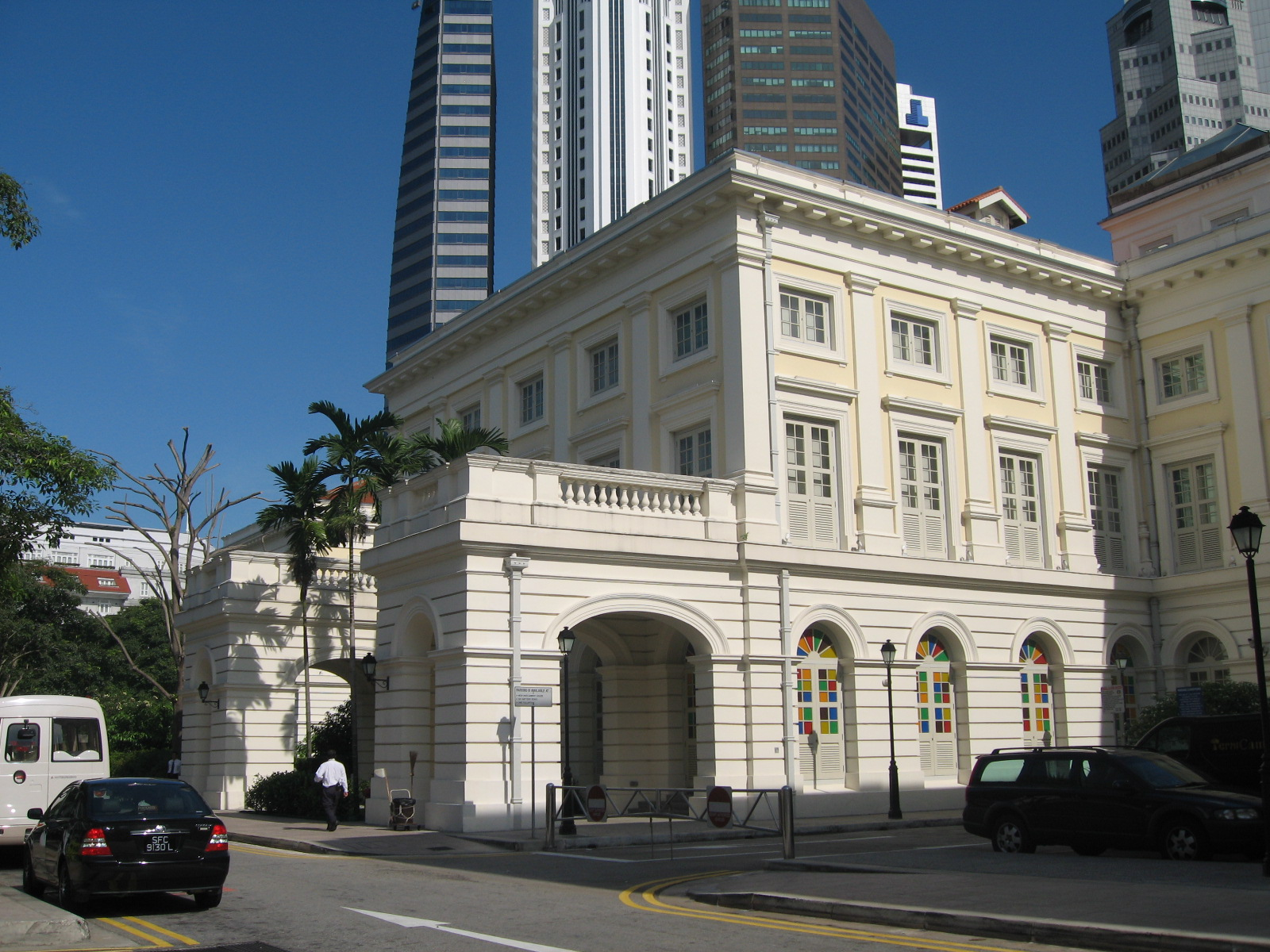
The Colonial Secretariat and the Colonial Secretary's Office (later Chief Secretary's Office) were located in the Empress Place Building.

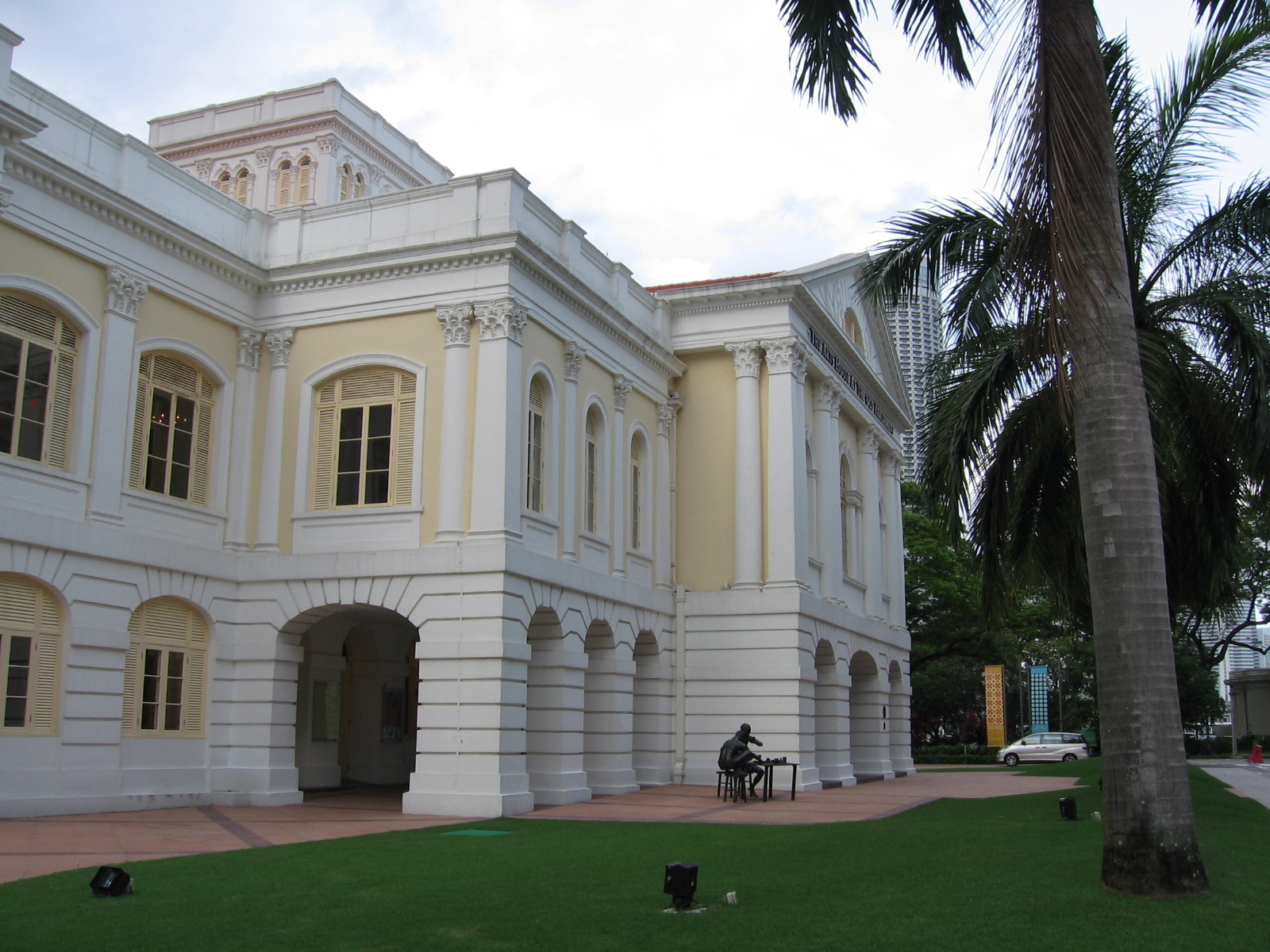
The Chief Secretary was one of the three ex officio members of the Legislative Assembly of Singapore

The position of the Chief Secretary and Colonial Secretary of Singapore, as well as the Colonial Secretary of the Straits Settlements, i.e. their predecessor, was the highest ranking position in the civil service during the colonial period. The status of a person holding this position was second only to that of the Governor of Singapore and the Governor of the Straits Settlements. When the Governor was on leave or when its post was vacant, the Chief Secretary would usually be in charge of appointing an acting Governor. As the highest-ranking official second to the Governor, the Chief Secretary was the head of the Chief Secretary's Office (formerly the Colonial Secretary's Office) and worked in the Empress Place Building, with other officials to assist him with his administration. The Colonial Secretary, predecessor of the Chief Secretary, was also responsible of the Colonial Secretariat situated in the Empress Place Palace, but after the Rendel Constitution took effect from February 1955, the Secretariat was abolished following a reduction in the Chief Secretary's powers, while the Chief Secretary's Office continued to function.

The Colonial Secretary had comparatively greater powers than the Chief Secretary. Similar to other British colonies, the Colonial Secretary was responsible of coordinating and overseeing the daily operation of government sectors and presided over the planning and enactment of important government policies. Besides Singapore, other places such as Penang, Malacca, Dinding and Labuan were also under the Colonial Secretary's jurisdiction during the Straits Settlements period; in addition, other than Singapore, these places also had their own Resident Councillor. On 1 April 1946, Singapore became a crown colony, reducing the Colonial Secretary's jurisdiction to only Singapore. After the Rendel Constitution took effect from February 1955, the Chief Minister position, the Council of Ministers as well as Legislative Assembly were created and the ministers who were popularly elected took up responsibility in governing Singapore, thus significantly reducing the Chief Secretary powers. Nevertheless, the Chief Secretary still controlled areas such as Singapore's foreign affairs, internal security, defence, broadcasting and public relations.

The Colonial Secretary and Chief Secretary had long been important official positions in colonial Singapore; since the formation of the Executive Council and the Legislative Council of the Straits Settlements in 1867, the Colonial Secretary was an ex officio member for both Councils. After World War II, both Councils were initially replaced by the Singapore Advisory Council in 1946; it was later officially restructured as the Executive and Legislative Councils of Singapore. The Colonial Secretary served in the Advisory Council as well as the Executive and Legislative Councils as an ex officio member in post-war Singapore. In February 1955, a democratic election system was introduced, with the Executive Council being replaced by the Council of Ministers, while the Legislative Council was restructured to form the Legislative Assembly. The Council of Ministers continued to be chaired by the Governor, while the Legislative Assembly was to be presided over by the Governor-appointed Speaker; The Colonial Secretary, together with the Attorney-General and the Financial Secretary continued to remain as ex officio members in both bodies, leaving them the only members who were concurrently colonial civil servants. In 1959, the State of Singapore was established, while the Council of Ministers was replaced by the Cabinet; The Legislative Assembly continued to function and the Prime Minister of Singapore was to preside over the Cabinet, while the position of the Chief Secretary was abolished.

The Colonial Secretary had the power to issue warrants to arrest and deport any persons suspected of endangering public order and social stability. The Chinese community back then regarded the colonial Governor as the highest ranking "prince" (王 wáng) under the British monarch, while the Colonial Secretary was viewed as a "prince" second to the Governor. Also, the word "warrant" was transliterated as "hua" (花 huā). Therefore, the Chinese community termed warrants issued by the Colonial Secretary as the "Second Prince's Warrant" (二王花 Èr-wáng Huā). Persons who were taken into custody and deported by the Colonial Secretary included Hau Say Hoan (侯西反), an anti-Japanese Chinese businessman who resided in Singapore for 38 years. He was accused by Sir Alexander Small, the then-Colonial Secretary of being anti-British and engaging in dealings with illegal organisations to endanger public order in December 1939; Small invoked the Expulsion Order and deported Hau, and prohibited him from re-entry.

== Career paths ==
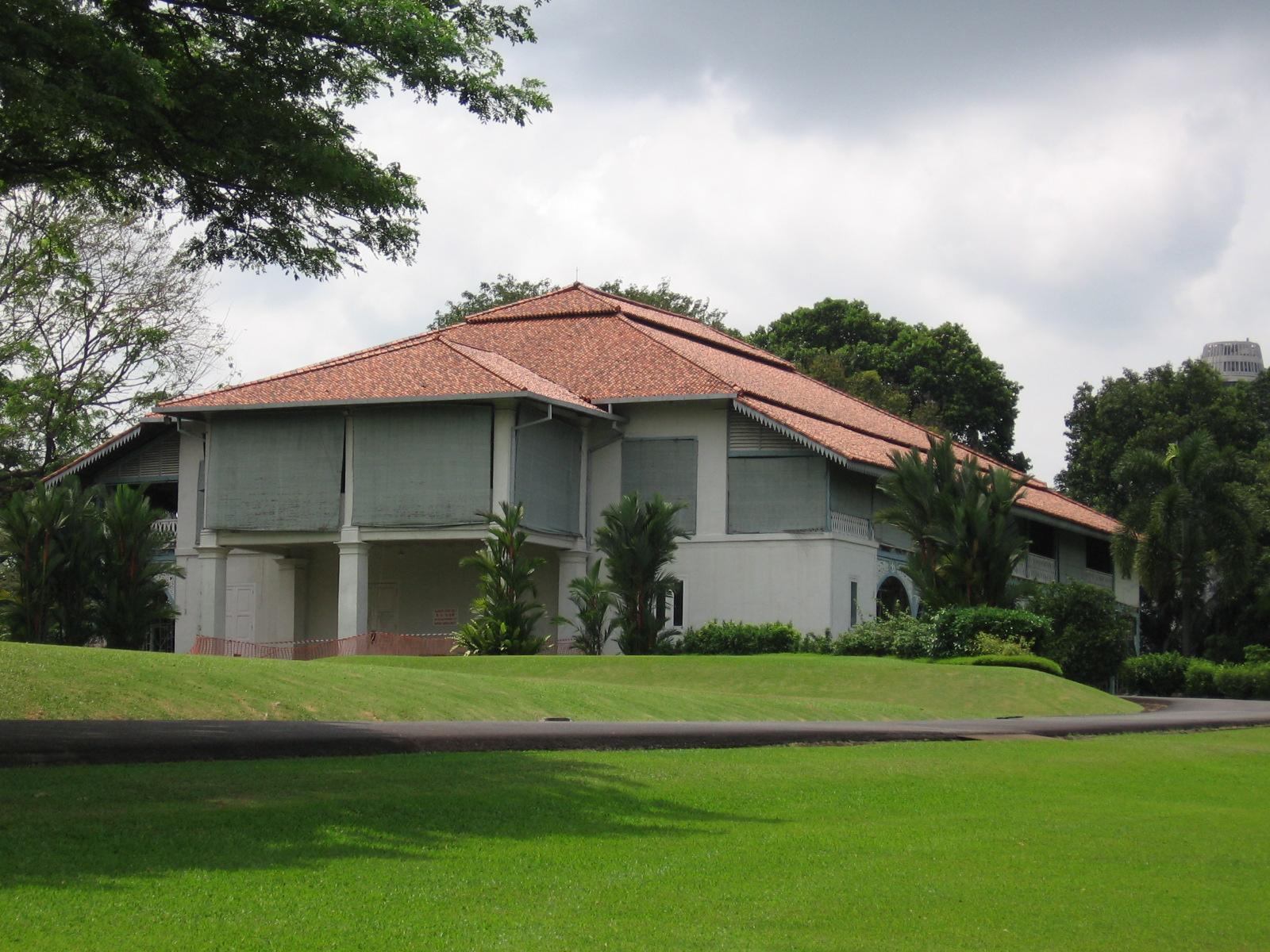
Sri Temasek, the official residence for Colonial Secretaries and Chief Secretaries from 1869 to 1959

In the colonial history of Singapore, the posts of Colonial Secretary and Chief Secretary were held by British colonial officials. Unlike Hong Kong, which is also a former British colony, no locals had ever been appointed as Colonial Secretary or Chief Secretary. In the early days, most of the Colonial Secretaries had colonial military background or had previously served in other parts of the Straits Settlements or the Malay Peninsula. In 1905, F. G. Penney became the first cadet to be appointed Colonial Secretary. Since then, many Colonial Secretaries and Chief Secretaries were cadets from the FMS or other parts of the Straits Settlements. Cadets were recruited from London by the Colonial Office through a systematic open recruitment test, and those who stand out were mainly outstanding graduates from top universities; these Colonial Secretaries and Chief Secretaries include Edward Brockman, Richard James Wilkinson, Sir Hayes Marriott, Sir Andrew Caldecott, Sir Alexander Small and E. B. David.

In colonial Singapore, the post of Colonial Secretary or Chief Secretary provided opportunities for promotion in the colonial civil service: Cecil Clementi Smith and Sir Arthur Young later became Governors of the Straits Settlements; Sir William Goode later served as Singapore's last Governor; John Douglas, James Alexander Swettenham, Walter Egerton (acting), Richard James Wilkinson and Andrew Caldecott later became Governors in other British colonies. There were also holders who retired after leaving office: F. G. Penney, Sir Hayes Marriott, Sir John Scott, Sir Alexander Small, Sir Patrick McKerron and W. L. Blythe.

The longest serving holder of the post was Sir F. S. James; he served for eight years from 1916 to 1924. The shortest serving was Edward Lewis Brockman; he held this appointment in 1911 but was transferred to serve as Chief Secretary of the FMS shortly after in the same year. In addition, Colonel Ronald MacPherson, the inaugural Colonial Secretary of the Straits Settlements was the only holder to have died in office.

Holders of the post of Colonial Secretary or Chief Secretary enjoyed remuneration and welfare similar to that of colonial secretaries or chief secretaries in other British colonies. According to data in 1892, the annual salary of the Colonial Secretary of the Straits Settlements was $10,800 (Straits dollar), the second highest among colonial officials in British Malaya after the Governor; the third highest-paying was the Resident Councillor of Penang, with a salary of $9,600 per year, excluding bonuses. The official residence of the Chief Secretary or Colonial Secretary was Sri Temasek, inaugurated in 1869, located within the grounds of the Government House. All holders of the position resided in Sri Temasek from 1869 to 1959.

== List of officeholders ==
=== Colonial Secretary of the Straits Settlements (1867–1942) ===
№	Portrait	Name (Born–Died)	Term of office		Origin and background	Governor (From–To)
№	Portrait	Name (Born–Died)	Took office	Left office	Origin and background	Governor (From–To)
1		Colonel Ronald MacPherson (1817–1869)	1 April 1867	6 December 1869 (Died in office)	Island of Skye, Scotland; Resident Councillor of Singapore	Sir Harry St. George Ord (1867-1871)
—		E W Shaw; Acting	7 December 1869	5 June 1870	— Colonial administrator	Sir Harry St. George Ord (1867-1871)
2		James Wheeler Woodford Birch (1826–1875)	6 June 1870	4 November 1874	— Colonial administrator	Sir Harry St. George Ord (1867-1871)
2		James Wheeler Woodford Birch (1826–1875)	6 June 1870	4 November 1874	— Colonial administrator	Edward Anson (1871-1872); 1st time Acting
2		James Wheeler Woodford Birch (1826–1875)	6 June 1870	4 November 1874	— Colonial administrator	Sir Harry St. George Ord (1872-1873)
2		James Wheeler Woodford Birch (1826–1875)	6 June 1870	4 November 1874	— Colonial administrator	Edward Anson (1873); 2nd time Acting
2		James Wheeler Woodford Birch (1826–1875)	6 June 1870	4 November 1874	— Colonial administrator	Sir Andrew Clarke (1873-1875)
—		Thomas Braddell (1823–1891); Acting	4 November 1874	17 February 1876	County Wicklow, Ireland; Attorney-General of Singapore	Sir Andrew Clarke (1873-1875)
—		William Willans (d. 1905); Acting	4 November 1874	17 February 1876	— Colonial Treasurer of Straits Settlements	Sir Andrew Clarke (1873-1875)
—		William Willans (d. 1905); Acting	4 November 1874	17 February 1876	— Colonial Treasurer of Straits Settlements	Sir William Jervois (1875-1877)
—		Charles John Irving (1831–1917); Acting	4 November 1874	17 February 1876	London, England; Auditor-General of Straits Settlements	Sir William Jervois (1875-1877)
3		Sir John Douglas (1836–1885)	17 February 1876	17 August 1878	Limerick, Ireland; Accountant General and Controller of Revenue	Sir William Jervois (1875-1877)
3		Sir John Douglas (1836–1885)	17 February 1876	17 August 1878	Limerick, Ireland; Accountant General and Controller of Revenue	Edward Anson (1877); 3rd time Acting
3		Sir John Douglas (1836–1885)	17 February 1876	17 August 1878	Limerick, Ireland; Accountant General and Controller of Revenue	Sir William Cleaver Francis Robinson (1877-1879)
4		Sir Cecil Clementi Smith (1840–1916)	3 September 1878	17 November 1885	London, England; Colonial Treasurer of Hong Kong	Sir William Cleaver Francis Robinson (1877-1879)
4		Sir Cecil Clementi Smith (1840–1916)	3 September 1878	17 November 1885	London, England; Colonial Treasurer of Hong Kong	Edward Anson (1879-1880); 4th time Acting
4		Sir Cecil Clementi Smith (1840–1916)	3 September 1878	17 November 1885	London, England; Colonial Treasurer of Hong Kong	Sir Frederick Weld (1880-1887)
5		Sir John Frederick Dickson (1835–1891)	17 November 1885	31 August 1891	— Colonial administrator	Sir Frederick Weld (1880-1887)
5		Sir John Frederick Dickson (1835–1891)	17 November 1885	31 August 1891	— Colonial administrator	Sir Cecil Clementi Smith (1887-1893)
—		Arthur Philip Talbot (b. 18?? – d. 19 December 1898); Acting	31 August 1891	9 March 1892	— Colonial administrator	Sir Cecil Clementi Smith (1887-1893)
6		William Edward Maxwell (1846–1897)	9 March 1892	11 February 1895	— British Resident of Selangor	Sir Cecil Clementi Smith (1887-1893)
6		William Edward Maxwell (1846–1897)	9 March 1892	11 February 1895	— British Resident of Selangor	William Edward Maxwell (1893-1894); Acting
6		William Edward Maxwell (1846–1897)	9 March 1892	11 February 1895	— British Resident of Selangor	Sir Charles Mitchell (1894-1899)
7		James Alexander Swettenham (1846–1933)	11 February 1895	7 December 1899	Derbyshire, England; Accountant General and Controller of Revenue	Sir Charles Mitchell (1894-1899)
—		Sir Walter Egerton (1858–1947); Acting	7 December 1899	5 July 1901	— Colonial administrator	James Alexander Swettenham (1899-1901); Acting
—		Charles Walter Sneyd-Kynnersley (1849-1904); Acting	7 December 1899	5 July 1901	— Colonial administrator	James Alexander Swettenham (1899-1901); Acting
8		Sir William Thomas Taylor (1848–1931)	5 July 1901	31 December 1904	— Accountant General and Controller of Revenue	Sir Frank Swettenham (1901-1904)
8		Sir William Thomas Taylor (1848–1931)	5 July 1901	31 December 1904	— Accountant General and Controller of Revenue	Sir John Anderson (1904-1911)
9		Frederick George Penney (c. 1856–1928)	1 January 1905	13 April 1905	— Resident Councillor of Malacca	Sir John Anderson (1904-1911)
—		Edward Lewis Brockman (1865–1943); Acting	13 April 1905	29 June 1906	— Assistant Colonial Secretary of Straits Settlements	Sir John Anderson (1904-1911)
10		Sir Arthur Young (1854–1938)	29 June 1906	31 January 1911	— Colonial administrator Navy officer	Sir John Anderson (1904-1911)
11		Edward Lewis Brockman (1865–1943)	1 February 1911	4 September 1911	— Resident of Pahang	Sir John Anderson (1904-1911)
12		Richard James Wilkinson (1867–1941)	4 September 1911	February 1916	Salonika, Greece; British Resident at Negeri Sembilan	Sir Arthur Young (1911-1920)
—		William George Maxwell (1871–1959); Acting	February 1916	April 1916	Malacca, Straits Settlements; British Adviser for Kedah	Sir Arthur Young (1911-1920)
13		Sir Frederick Seton James (1870–1934)	April 1916	19 March 1924	UK; Colonial administrator	Sir Arthur Young (1911-1920)
13		Sir Frederick Seton James (1870–1934)	April 1916	19 March 1924	UK; Colonial administrator	Sir Laurence Guillemard (1920-1927)
—		George Hemmant (1880–1964); Acting; 1st time Acting	19 March 1924	2 April 1924	— Colonial administrator	Sir Laurence Guillemard (1920-1927)
14		Edward Shaw Hose (1871–1946)	2 April 1924	21 November 1925	Surrey, England; British Resident of Negri Sembilan	Sir Laurence Guillemard (1920-1927)
15		Sir Hayes Marriott (1873–1929)	21 November 1925	16 December 1928	— General Adviser to Johore	Sir Laurence Guillemard (1920-1927)
15		Sir Hayes Marriott (1873–1929)	21 November 1925	16 December 1928	— General Adviser to Johore	Sir Hugh Clifford (1927-1929)
—		George Hemmant (1880–1964); 2nd time Acting	16 December 1928	12 February 1929	— Colonial administrator	Sir Hugh Clifford (1927-1929)
16		Sir John Scott (1878–1946)	12 February 1929	23 May 1933	— Chief Secretary of Tanganyika Territory	Sir Hugh Clifford (1927-1929)
16		Sir John Scott (1878–1946)	12 February 1929	23 May 1933	— Chief Secretary of Tanganyika Territory	Sir John Scott (1929-1930); Acting
16		Sir John Scott (1878–1946)	12 February 1929	23 May 1933	— Chief Secretary of Tanganyika Territory	Sir Cecil Clementi (1930-1934)
17		Sir Andrew Caldecott (1884–1951)	23 May 1933	7 December 1935	Kent, England; Chief Secretary of Federated Malaya States (FMS)	Sir Cecil Clementi (1930-1934)
17		Sir Andrew Caldecott (1884–1951)	23 May 1933	7 December 1935	Kent, England; Chief Secretary of Federated Malaya States (FMS)	Sir Shenton Thomas (1934-1942) & (1945-1946)
18		Sir Alexander Sym Small (1887–1944)	7 December 1935	19 January 1940	North Lanarkshire, Scotland; Treasurer of Straits Settlements	Sir Shenton Thomas (1934-1942) & (1945-1946)
19		Stanley Wilson Jones (1888–1962)	19 January 1940	27 January 1942	— British Resident of Selangor	Sir Shenton Thomas (1934-1942) & (1945-1946)
—		Hugh Fraser (1891–1944); Acting	27 January 1942	15 February 1942	— Colonial administrator	Sir Shenton Thomas (1934-1942) & (1945-1946)

=== Colonial Secretary of Singapore (1946–1955) ===
№	Portrait	Name (Born–Died)	Term of office		Origin and background	Governor (From–To)
№	Portrait	Name (Born–Died)	Took office	Left office	Origin and background	Governor (From–To)
1		Sir Patrick Alexander Bruce McKerron (1896–1964)	1 April 1946	29 April 1950	Aberdeen, Scotland; Deputy Chief Civil Affairs Officer	Sir Franklin Charles Gimson (1946-1952)
—		James David Maxwell Smith (1895-1969); Acting	29 April 1950	30 June 1950	— Financial Secretary	Sir Franklin Charles Gimson (1946-1952)
		Wilfred Lawson Blythe (1896–1975)	30 June 1950	30 July 1953	— Colonial administrator	Sir Franklin Charles Gimson (1946-1952)
2		Wilfred Lawson Blythe (1896–1975)	30 June 1950	30 July 1953	— Colonial administrator	
2		Wilfred Lawson Blythe (1896–1975)	30 June 1950	30 July 1953	— Colonial administrator	Wilfred Lawson Blythe (1952); Acting
2		Wilfred Lawson Blythe (1896–1975)	30 June 1950	30 July 1953	— Colonial administrator	Sir John Fearns Nicoll (1952-1955)
3		William Allmond Codrington Goode (1907–1986)	30 July 1953	February 1955	Middlesex, England; Colonial administrator	Sir John Fearns Nicoll (1952-1955)

=== Chief Secretary of Singapore (1955–1959) ===
№	Portrait	Name (Born–Died)	Term of office		Origin and background	Governor (From–To)
№	Portrait	Name (Born–Died)	Took office	Left office	Origin and background	Governor (From–To)
1		William Allmond Codrington Goode (1907–1986)	February 1955	9 December 1957	Middlesex, England; Colonial Secretary of Singapore	William Goode (1955); Acting
1		William Allmond Codrington Goode (1907–1986)	February 1955	9 December 1957	Middlesex, England; Colonial Secretary of Singapore	Sir Robert Brown Black (1955-1957)
		William Allmond Codrington Goode (1907–1986)	February 1955	9 December 1957	Middlesex, England; Colonial Secretary of Singapore	William Goode (1957-1959)
2		Edgeworth Beresford David (1908–1965)	1958	2 June 1959	London, England; Colonial Secretary of Hong Kong	William Goode (1957-1959)

== See also ==
- Governor of the Straits Settlements
- Governor of Singapore
- Chief Minister of Singapore
