= List of governors of Singapore =

Below is a list of governors of Singapore. They were the political leaders of Singapore as part of the Straits Settlements and as a Crown colony prior to its attainment of full internal self-governance under British sovereignty.

== Residents of Singapore (1819–1826) ==
The Resident of Singapore ruled the British colony that is today the Republic of Singapore. The persons on this position governed Singapore from 1819 to 1826, on behalf of the British East India Company.

British East India Company
No.	Portrait	Name (Born–Died)	Term of office			Background or previous appointment	Monarch
No.	Portrait	Name (Born–Died)	Took office	Left office	Duration	Background or previous appointment	Monarch
1		Major-General William Farquhar (1774–1839)	6 February 1819	1 May 1823	4 years, 2 months	Resident of Malacca, Chief Engineer	George III
1		Major-General William Farquhar (1774–1839)	6 February 1819	1 May 1823	4 years, 2 months	Resident of Malacca, Chief Engineer	George IV
2		Dr John Crawfurd (1783–1868)	27 May 1823	15 August 1826	3 years, 2 months	Surgeon, Diplomat	George IV

== Governors of the Straits Settlements (1826–1942) ==
The Governor of the Straits Settlements ruled the Straits Settlements. The persons on this position governed the Straits Settlements from 1826 to 1946, on behalf of the British East India Company (1826–1858), the India Office (1858–1867) and the Colonial Office (1867–1946) respectively.

British Straits Settlements
No.	Portrait	Name (Born–Died)	Term of office			Background or previous appointment	Monarch
No.	Portrait	Name (Born–Died)	Took office	Left office	Duration	Background or previous appointment	Monarch
1		Robert Fullerton (1773–1831)	27 November 1826	12 November 1830	3 years, 11 months	Second Member of Council, and President of the Board of Trade	George IV
1		Robert Fullerton (1773–1831)	27 November 1826	12 November 1830	3 years, 11 months	Second Member of Council, and President of the Board of Trade	William IV
2		Robert Ibbetson (1789–1880)	12 November 1830	7 December 1833	3 years, 25 days	Resident Councillor of the Prince of Wales Island	William IV
3		Kenneth Murchison (1794–1854)	7 December 1833	17 November 1836	2 years, 11 months	Resident Councillor of the Straits Settlements	William IV
4		Sir Samuel George Bonham (1803–1863)	18 November 1836	January 1843	6 years, 1 month	Resident Councillor of the Straits Settlements	William IV
4		Sir Samuel George Bonham (1803–1863)	18 November 1836	January 1843	6 years, 1 month	Resident Councillor of the Straits Settlements	Victoria
British East India Company							Victoria
5		Major General William John Butterworth (1801–1856)	August 1843	21 March 1855	11 years, 9 months	Lieutenant-Colonel of the 38th Madras Regiment	Victoria
6		Edmund Augustus Blundell (1804–1868)	21 March 1855	6 August 1859	4 years, 4 months	Resident Councillor of Penang	Victoria
India Office							Victoria
7		Major General Sir Orfeur Cavenagh (1820–1891)	6 August 1859	16 March 1867	7 years, 7 months	British Indian Army	Victoria
Colonial Office							Victoria
8		Major General Sir Harry Ord (1819–1885)	16 March 1867	4 March 1871	3 years, 11 months	Special Commissioner to West Africa	Victoria
—		Major General Edward Anson (1826–1925) (acting)	4 March 1871	22 March 1872	1 year and 18 days	Lieutenant Governor of Penang	Victoria
8		Major General Sir Harry Ord (1819–1885)	22 March 1872	3 November 1873	1 year, 7 months	Colonial administrator	Victoria
—		Major General Edward Anson (1826–1925) (acting)	3 November 1873	4 November 1873	1 day	Lieutenant Governor of Penang	Victoria
9		Sir Andrew Clarke (1824–1902)	4 November 1873	8 May 1875	1 year, 6 months	Director of Works at the Admiralty	Victoria
10		Sir William Jervois (1821–1897)	8 May 1875	3 April 1877	1 year, 10 months	Colonel of the Royal Engineers	Victoria
—		Major General Edward Anson (1826–1925) (acting)	3 April 1877	August 1877	4 months	Lieutenant Governor of Penang	Victoria
11		Sir William Cleaver Francis Robinson (1834–1897)	August 1877	10 February 1879	1 year, 5 months	Governor of Western Australia	Victoria
—		Major General Edward Anson (1826–1925) (acting)	10 February 1879	16 May 1880	1 year, 3 months	Lieutenant Governor of Penang	Victoria
12		Sir Frederick Weld (1823–1891)	16 May 1880	17 October 1887	7 years, 5 months	Governor of Tasmania	Victoria
13		Sir Cecil Clementi Smith (1840–1916)	17 October 1887	30 August 1893	5 years, 10 months	Colonial Secretary of the Straits Settlements	Victoria
—		William Edward Maxwell (1846–1897) (acting)	30 August 1893	1 February 1894	5 months and 2 days	Colonial Secretary of the Straits Settlements	Victoria
14		Sir Charles Mitchell (1836–1899); Died while in office	1 February 1894	7 December 1899	5 years, 10 months	Governor of Natal	Victoria
—		James Alexander Swettenham (1846–1933) (acting)	7 December 1899	5 November 1901	1 year, 10 months	Colonial Secretary of the Straits Settlements	Victoria
—		James Alexander Swettenham (1846–1933) (acting)	7 December 1899	5 November 1901	1 year, 10 months	Colonial Secretary of the Straits Settlements	Edward VII
15		Sir Frank Swettenham (1850–1946)	5 November 1901	16 April 1904	2 years, 5 months	Resident-General of the Federated Malay States	Edward VII
16		Sir John Anderson (1858–1918)	16 April 1904	2 September 1911	7 years, 4 months	Colonial administrator	Edward VII
16		Sir John Anderson (1858–1918)	16 April 1904	2 September 1911	7 years, 4 months	Colonial administrator	George V
17		Sir Arthur Young (1854–1938)	2 September 1911	17 February 1920	8 years, 5 months	Resident-General of the Federated Malay States	George V
18		Sir Laurence Guillemard (1862–1951)	17 February 1920	3 June 1927	7 years, 3 months	Colonial administrator	George V
19		Sir Hugh Clifford (1866–1941)	3 June 1927	21 October 1929	2 years, 4 months	Governor of British Ceylon	George V
—		Sir John Scott (1878 – 1946) (acting)	21 October 1929	5 February 1930	3 months and 15 days	Colonial Secretary of the Straits Settlements	George V
20		Sir Cecil Clementi (1875–1947)	5 February 1930	17 February 1934	4 years and 12 days	Governor of Hong Kong	George V
—		Sir Andrew Caldecott (1884–1951) (acting)	17 February 1934	9 November 1934	8 months and 23 days	Colonial Secretary of the Straits Settlements	George V
		Sir Shenton Thomas (1879–1962)	9 November 1934	15 February 1942	7 years, 3 months	Governor of the Gold Coast	George V
21		Sir Shenton Thomas (1879–1962)	9 November 1934	15 February 1942	7 years, 3 months	Governor of the Gold Coast	George V
21		Sir Shenton Thomas (1879–1962)	9 November 1934	15 February 1942	7 years, 3 months	Governor of the Gold Coast	Edward VIII
21		Sir Shenton Thomas (1879–1962)	9 November 1934	15 February 1942	7 years, 3 months	Governor of the Gold Coast	George VI
Japanese occupation of Singapore

== Japanese occupation (1942 to 1945) ==
During the Japanese occupation of Singapore, there were two Mayors and five Military Administrators appointed to Syonan-to.

Mayor of Syonan-to「昭南島」(Shōnan-tō)
No.	Portrait	Name (Born–Died)	Term of office			Background or previous appointment	Monarch
No.	Portrait	Name (Born–Died)	Took office	Left office	Duration	Background or previous appointment	Monarch
1		Odate Shigeo (1892–1955)	7 March 1942	8 July 1943	1 year, 4 months	Bureaucrat in the Home Ministry	Emperor Shōwa
2		Naito Kanichi (1897–19??)	19 July 1943	12 September 1945	2 years, 1 month	Chief Military Administrator	Emperor Shōwa
End of Japanese occupation of Singapore

Military Administrator of Syonan-to「昭南島」(Shōnan-tō)
No.	Portrait	Name (Born–Died)	Term of office		Background or previous appointment	Monarch
No.	Portrait	Name (Born–Died)	Took office	Left office	Background or previous appointment	Monarch
1		Yamashita Tomoyuki (1888–1946)	15 February 1942	1 July 1942	Commanding Officer of the Japanese 25th Army	Emperor Shōwa
2		Yaheita Saito (1885-1953)	1 July 1942	8 April 1943	Commanding Officer of the Japanese 25th Army	Emperor Shōwa
3		Terauchi Hisaichi (1879–1946)	8 April 1943	22 March 1944	Commanding Officer of the Southern Expeditionary Army Group	Emperor Shōwa
4		Doihara Kenji (1883–1948)	22 March 1944	7 April 1945	Commanding Officer of the Japanese 7th Area Army	Emperor Shōwa
5		Itagaki Seishiro (1885–1948)	7 April 1945	12 September 1945	Commanding Officer of the Japanese 7th Area Army	Emperor Shōwa
End of Japanese occupation of Singapore						Emperor Shōwa

== Governors of the Straits Settlements (1945–1946) ==
British Straits Settlements
No.	Portrait	Name (Born–Died)	Term of office			Background or previous appointment	Monarch
No.	Portrait	Name (Born–Died)	Took office	Left office	Duration	Background or previous appointment	Monarch
British Military Administration of the Straits Settlements From 12 September 1945 to 31 March 1946.							George VI
—		Lord Louis Mountbatten (1900–1979); British High Command	12 September 1945	31 March 1946	6 months and 19 days	Supreme Allied Commander of the Southeast Asia Theatre	George VI
British Straits Settlements							George VI
21		Sir Shenton Thomas (1879–1962)	12 September 1945	31 March 1946	6 months and 19 days	Colonial administrator	George VI
Singapore became a separate Crown Colony							George VI

== Governors of Singapore (1946–1959) ==
The Governor of Singapore governs Singapore. The persons on this position governed the Colony of Singapore from 1946 to 1959, on behalf of the Colonial Office until Singapore gained self-governance in 1959 in which the Office of the Governor was abolished.

Crown Colony of Singapore
No.	Portrait	Name (Born–Died)	Term of office			Background or previous appointment	Monarch
No.	Portrait	Name (Born–Died)	Took office	Left office	Duration	Background or previous appointment	Monarch
1		Sir Franklin Charles Gimson (1890–1975)	1 April 1946	20 March 1952	5 years, 11 months	Colonial Secretary of Hong Kong	George VI
1		Sir Franklin Charles Gimson (1890–1975)	1 April 1946	20 March 1952	5 years, 11 months	Colonial Secretary of Hong Kong	Elizabeth II
—		Wilfred Lawson Blythe (1896–1975) (acting)	20 March 1952	21 April 1952	1 month and 1 day	Colonial Secretary of Singapore	Elizabeth II
2		Sir John Fearns Nicoll (1899–1981)	21 April 1952	2 June 1955	3 years, 1 month	Colonial Secretary of Hong Kong	Elizabeth II
—		Sir William Goode (1907–1986) (acting)	2 June 1955	30 June 1955	28 days	Colonial Secretary of Singapore	Elizabeth II
3		Sir Robert Black (1906–1999)	30 June 1955	9 December 1957	2 years, 5 months	Colonial Secretary of Hong Kong	Elizabeth II
4		Sir William Goode (1907–1986)	9 December 1957	2 June 1959	1 year, 5 months	Chief Secretary of Singapore	Elizabeth II
Singapore is granted self-governance in 1959 within the British Empire

== See also ==
- Chief Secretary, Singapore
- Governor of North Borneo
- History of Malaysia
- History of Singapore
- Legislative Council of Singapore
- Legislative Council of the Straits Settlements
- List of Chief Secretaries of Singapore
- President of Singapore
- Prime Minister of Singapore
- Yang di-Pertuan Negara of Singapore
