= List of chief secretaries of Singapore =

== Resident councillors of Singapore (1826-1867) ==
The resident councillor of Singapore was a high ranking government civil position in colonial Singapore during the Straits Settlements era. It was second only to the governor of the Straits Settlements in the colonial government.

No.	Portrait	Name (Born–Died)	Term of office		Background or previous appointment	Governor (From–To)
No.	Portrait	Name (Born–Died)	Took office	Left office	Background or previous appointment	Governor (From–To)
1		John Prince (1772-1848)	15 August 1826	18 November 1827	—	Robert Fullerton (1826-1830)
2		Kenneth Murchison (1794–1854)	29 November 1827	6 December 1833	Employee at East India Company	Robert Fullerton (1826-1830)
2		Kenneth Murchison (1794–1854)	29 November 1827	6 December 1833	Employee at East India Company	Robert Ibbetson (1830-1833)
3		Sir Samuel George Bonham (1803–1863)	7 December 1833	18 November 1836	Employee at East India Company	Kenneth Murchison (1833-1836)
4		Thomas Church (1798–1860)	4 March 1837	20 September 1856	Assistant Resident of Pinang	George Bonham (1836-1843)
4		Thomas Church (1798–1860)	4 March 1837	20 September 1856	Assistant Resident of Pinang	William John Butterworth (1843-1855)
4		Thomas Church (1798–1860)	4 March 1837	20 September 1856	Assistant Resident of Pinang	Edmund Augustus Blundell (1855-1859)
5		Henry Somerset MacKenzie (1826–1904)	22 September 1856	13 July 1859	—	Edmund Augustus Blundell (1855-1859)
5		Henry Somerset MacKenzie (1826–1904)	22 September 1856	13 July 1859	—	William Orfeur Cavenagh (1859-1867)
—		Colonel Ronald MacPherson (1817–1869)	10 March 1859 — 7 October 1860; As acting Resident Councillor		Resident Councillor of Malacca	William Orfeur Cavenagh (1859-1867)
6		Colonel Ronald MacPherson (1817–1869)	8 October 1860	31 March 1867	Resident Councillor of Malacca	William Orfeur Cavenagh (1859-1867)

== Colonial secretaries of the Straits Settlements (1867–1942) ==
No.	Portrait	Name (Born–Died)	Term of office		Origin	Background or previous appointment	Governor (From–To)
No.	Portrait	Name (Born–Died)	Took office	Left office	Origin	Background or previous appointment	Governor (From–To)
1		Colonel Ronald MacPherson (1817–1869)	1 April 1867	6 December 1869 (Died in office)	Island of Skye, Scotland	Resident Councillor of Singapore	Sir Harry Ord (1867-1871)
—		E W Shaw; Acting	7 December 1869	5 June 1870	—	Colonial administrator	Sir Harry Ord (1867-1871)
2		James Wheeler Woodford Birch (1826–1875)	6 June 1870	4 November 1874	—	Colonial administrator	Sir Harry Ord (1867-1871)
2		James Wheeler Woodford Birch (1826–1875)	6 June 1870	4 November 1874	—	Colonial administrator	Edward Anson (1871-1872); 1st time Acting
2		James Wheeler Woodford Birch (1826–1875)	6 June 1870	4 November 1874	—	Colonial administrator	Sir Harry Ord (1872-1873)
2		James Wheeler Woodford Birch (1826–1875)	6 June 1870	4 November 1874	—	Colonial administrator	Edward Anson (1873); 2nd time Acting
2		James Wheeler Woodford Birch (1826–1875)	6 June 1870	4 November 1874	—	Colonial administrator	Sir Andrew Clarke (1873-1875)
—		Thomas Braddell (1823–1891); Acting	4 November 1874	17 February 1876	County Wicklow, Ireland	Attorney-General of Singapore	Sir Andrew Clarke (1873-1875)
—		William Willans (d. 1905); Acting	4 November 1874	17 February 1876	—	Colonial Treasurer of Straits Settlements	Sir Andrew Clarke (1873-1875)
—		William Willans (d. 1905); Acting	4 November 1874	17 February 1876	—	Colonial Treasurer of Straits Settlements	Sir William Jervois (1875-1877)
—		Charles John Irving (1831–1917); Acting	4 November 1874	17 February 1876	London, England	Auditor-General of Straits Settlements	Sir William Jervois (1875-1877)
3		Sir John Douglas (1836–1885)	17 February 1876	17 August 1878	Limerick, Ireland	Accountant General and Controller of Revenue	Sir William Jervois (1875-1877)
3		Sir John Douglas (1836–1885)	17 February 1876	17 August 1878	Limerick, Ireland	Accountant General and Controller of Revenue	Edward Anson (1877); 3rd time Acting
3		Sir John Douglas (1836–1885)	17 February 1876	17 August 1878	Limerick, Ireland	Accountant General and Controller of Revenue	Sir William Cleaver Francis Robinson (1877-1879)
4		Sir Cecil Clementi Smith (1840–1916)	3 September 1878	17 November 1885	London, England	Colonial Treasurer of Hong Kong	Sir William Cleaver Francis Robinson (1877-1879)
4		Sir Cecil Clementi Smith (1840–1916)	3 September 1878	17 November 1885	London, England	Colonial Treasurer of Hong Kong	Edward Anson (1879-1880); 4th time Acting
4		Sir Cecil Clementi Smith (1840–1916)	3 September 1878	17 November 1885	London, England	Colonial Treasurer of Hong Kong	Sir Frederick Weld (1880-1887)
5		Sir John Frederick Dickson (1835–1891)	17 November 1885	31 August 1891	—	Colonial administrator	Sir Frederick Weld (1880-1887)
5		Sir John Frederick Dickson (1835–1891)	17 November 1885	31 August 1891	—	Colonial administrator	Sir Cecil Clementi Smith (1887-1893)
—		Arthur Philip Talbot (b. 18?? – d. 19 December 1898); Acting	31 August 1891	9 March 1892	—	Colonial administrator	Sir Cecil Clementi Smith (1887-1893)
6		William Edward Maxwell (1846–1897)	9 March 1892	11 February 1895	—	British Resident of Selangor	Sir Cecil Clementi Smith (1887-1893)
6		William Edward Maxwell (1846–1897)	9 March 1892	11 February 1895	—	British Resident of Selangor	William Edward Maxwell (1893-1894); Acting
6		William Edward Maxwell (1846–1897)	9 March 1892	11 February 1895	—	British Resident of Selangor	Sir Charles Mitchell (1894-1899)
7		James Alexander Swettenham (1846–1933)	11 February 1895	7 December 1899	Derbyshire, England	Accountant General and Controller of Revenue	Sir Charles Mitchell (1894-1899)
—		Sir Walter Egerton (1858–1947); Acting	7 December 1899	5 July 1901	—	Colonial administrator	James Alexander Swettenham (1899-1901); Acting
—		Charles Walter Sneyd-Kynnersley (1849-1904); Acting	7 December 1899	5 July 1901	—	Colonial administrator	James Alexander Swettenham (1899-1901); Acting
8		Sir William Thomas Taylor (1848–1931)	5 July 1901	31 December 1904	—	Accountant General and Controller of Revenue	Sir Frank Swettenham (1901-1904)
8		Sir William Thomas Taylor (1848–1931)	5 July 1901	31 December 1904	—	Accountant General and Controller of Revenue	Sir John Anderson (1904-1911)
9		Frederick George Penney (c. 1856–1928)	1 January 1905	13 April 1905	—	Resident Councillor of Malacca	Sir John Anderson (1904-1911)
—		Edward Lewis Brockman (1865–1943); Acting	13 April 1905	29 June 1906	—	Assistant Colonial Secretary of Straits Settlements	Sir John Anderson (1904-1911)
10		Sir Arthur Young (1854–1938)	29 June 1906	31 January 1911	—	Colonial administrator Navy officer	Sir John Anderson (1904-1911)
11		Edward Lewis Brockman (1865–1943)	1 February 1911	4 September 1911	—	Resident of Pahang	Sir John Anderson (1904-1911)
12		Richard James Wilkinson (1867–1941)	4 September 1911	February 1916	Salonika, Greece	British Resident at Negeri Sembilan	Sir Arthur Young (1911-1920)
—		William George Maxwell (1871–1959); Acting	February 1916	April 1916	Malacca, Straits Settlements	British Adviser for Kedah	Sir Arthur Young (1911-1920)
13		Sir Frederick Seton James (1870–1934)	April 1916	19 March 1924	UK	Colonial administrator	Sir Arthur Young (1911-1920)
13		Sir Frederick Seton James (1870–1934)	April 1916	19 March 1924	UK	Colonial administrator	Sir Laurence Guillemard (1920-1927)
—		George Hemmant (1880–1964); Acting; 1st time Acting	19 March 1924	2 April 1924	—	Colonial administrator	Sir Laurence Guillemard (1920-1927)
14		Edward Shaw Hose (1871–1946)	2 April 1924	21 November 1925	Surrey, England	British Resident of Negri Sembilan	Sir Laurence Guillemard (1920-1927)
15		Sir Hayes Marriott (1873–1929)	21 November 1925	16 December 1928	—	General Adviser to Johore	Sir Laurence Guillemard (1920-1927)
15		Sir Hayes Marriott (1873–1929)	21 November 1925	16 December 1928	—	General Adviser to Johore	Sir Hugh Clifford (1927-1929)
—		George Hemmant (1880–1964); 2nd time Acting	16 December 1928	12 February 1929	—	Colonial administrator	Sir Hugh Clifford (1927-1929)
16		Sir John Scott (1878–1946)	12 February 1929	23 May 1933	—	Chief Secretary of Tanganyika Territory	Sir Hugh Clifford (1927-1929)
16		Sir John Scott (1878–1946)	12 February 1929	23 May 1933	—	Chief Secretary of Tanganyika Territory	Sir John Scott (1929-1930); Acting
16		Sir John Scott (1878–1946)	12 February 1929	23 May 1933	—	Chief Secretary of Tanganyika Territory	Sir Cecil Clementi (1930-1934)
17		Sir Andrew Caldecott (1884–1951)	23 May 1933	7 December 1935	Kent, England	Chief Secretary of Federated Malaya States (FMS)	Sir Cecil Clementi (1930-1934)
17		Sir Andrew Caldecott (1884–1951)	23 May 1933	7 December 1935	Kent, England	Chief Secretary of Federated Malaya States (FMS)	Sir Shenton Thomas (1934-1942) & (1945-1946)
18		Sir Alexander Sym Small (1887–1944)	7 December 1935	19 January 1940	North Lanarkshire, Scotland	Treasurer of Straits Settlements	Sir Shenton Thomas (1934-1942) & (1945-1946)
19		Stanley Wilson Jones (1888–1962)	19 January 1940	27 January 1942	—	British Resident of Selangor	Sir Shenton Thomas (1934-1942) & (1945-1946)
—		Hugh Fraser (1891–1944); Acting	27 January 1942	15 February 1942	—	Colonial administrator	Sir Shenton Thomas (1934-1942) & (1945-1946)

== Colonial secretaries of Singapore (1946-1955) ==
No.	Portrait	Name (Born–Died)	Term of office		Background or previous appointment	Governor (From–To)
No.	Portrait	Name (Born–Died)	Took office	Left office	Background or previous appointment	Governor (From–To)
1		Sir Patrick McKerron (1896–1964)	1 April 1946	29 April 1950	Deputy Chief Civil Affairs Officer	Sir Franklin Charles Gimson (1946-1952)
—		James David Maxwell Smith (1895-1969); Acting	29 April 1950	30 June 1950	Financial Secretary	Sir Franklin Charles Gimson (1946-1952)
		Wilfred Lawson Blythe (1896–1975)	30 June 1950	30 July 1953	Colonial administrator	Sir Franklin Charles Gimson (1946-1952)
2		Wilfred Lawson Blythe (1896–1975)	30 June 1950	30 July 1953	Colonial administrator	
2		Wilfred Lawson Blythe (1896–1975)	30 June 1950	30 July 1953	Colonial administrator	Wilfred Lawson Blythe (1952); Acting
2		Wilfred Lawson Blythe (1896–1975)	30 June 1950	30 July 1953	Colonial administrator	Sir John Fearns Nicoll (1952-1955)
3		William Allmond Codrington Goode (1907–1986)	30 July 1953	February 1955	Colonial administrator	Sir John Fearns Nicoll (1952-1955)

== Chief secretaries of Singapore (1955-1959) ==
No.	Portrait	Name (Born–Died)	Term of office		Background or previous appointment	Governor (From–To)
No.	Portrait	Name (Born–Died)	Took office	Left office	Background or previous appointment	Governor (From–To)
1		William Goode (1907–1986)	February 1955	9 December 1957	Colonial Secretary of Singapore	William Goode (1955); Acting
1		William Goode (1907–1986)	February 1955	9 December 1957	Colonial Secretary of Singapore	Sir Robert Brown Black (1955-1957)
		William Goode (1907–1986)	February 1955	9 December 1957	Colonial Secretary of Singapore	William Goode (1957-1959)
2		Edgeworth Beresford David (1908–1965)	29 January 1958	2 June 1959	Colonial Secretary of Hong Kong	William Goode (1957-1959)
