= Governor Scott =

Governor Scott may refer to:

- Abram M. Scott (1785–1833), 7th Governor of Mississippi
- Alan James Scott (born 1934), Governor of the Cayman Islands from 1987 to 1992
- Charles Scott (governor) (1739–1813), 4th Governor of Kentucky
- Christina Scott (born 1974), 12th Governor of Anguilla
- David Aubrey Scott (1919–2010), Governor of the Pitcairn Islands from 1973 to 1975
- George Scott (British Army officer) (died 1767), Governor of Grenada from 1764 to 1767
- John Scott (colonial administrator) (1878–1946), Acting Governor of Tanganyika Territory from 1924 to 1925 and Acting Governor of the Straits Settlements from 1929 to 1930
- Phil Scott (born 1958), 82nd Governor of Vermont
- Rick Scott (born 1952), 45th Governor of Florida
- Robert Scott (colonial administrator) (1903–1968), Governor of Mauritius from 1954 to 1959
- Robert Kingston Scott (1826–1900), 74th Governor of South Carolina
- Robert W. Scott (1929–2009), 67th Governor of North Carolina, son of W. Kerr Scott.
- W. Kerr Scott (1896–1958), 62nd Governor of North Carolina
