= George Hemmant =

Colonial administrator (1880–1964)

George Hemmant CMG

Chief Secretary of Nigeria
- In office October 1930 – 1934
- Preceded by: Sir Frank Baddeley
- Succeeded by: John Alexander Maybin

Acting Colonial Secretary of Straits Settlements
- In office 16 December 1928 – 12 February 1929
- Monarch: George V
- Governor: Sir Hugh Clifford
- Preceded by: Sir Hayes Marriott
- Succeeded by: Sir John Scott
- In office 19 March 1924 – 2 April 1924
- Monarch: George V
- Governor: Sir Laurence Guillemard
- Preceded by: Sir Frederick Seton James
- Succeeded by: Edward Shaw Hose

Personal details
- Born: 13 October 1880
- Died: 31 December 1964 (aged 84)
- Spouse: Gladys Evelyn (m. 1925–1964)
- Children: Maurice Hemmant (son)
- Parents: William Hemmant (father); Lucy Elizabeth Ground (mother)
- Profession: Colonial administrator

George Hemmant CMG (13 October 1880 – 31 December 1964) was a colonial administrator. He joined the Malayan Civil Service and was a cadet on 27 November 1903. He served most of his civil service career in Federated Malay States and Straits Settlements.

== Career ==
=== Federated Malay States ===
Hemmant joined the Malayan Civil Service and was a cadet on 27 November 1903. In June 1904, he was the acting Assistant District Treasurer (Kuala Lumpur) and the following year was Acting Revenue Auditor (Negri Sembilan) and Acting Assistant District Officer (Kuala Pilah and Tampin). In 1908, he held the positions of Acting District Officer (Jelebu) and Acting Assistant District Officer (Kuala Pilah and Tampin). In 1910, he was the Assistant Collector of Land Revenue (Seremban) and District Officer (Temerloh) in 1911. In 1914, he was transferred to Kedah as Acting Legal Adviser before he became the Acting Assistant Adviser (Muar) in 1916 till 1918. In November 1919, he was appointed as the Collector of Land Revenue (Kuala Lumpur) and Registrar of Titles (Selangor). In 1922, he was the Magistrate in Kuala Lumpur (till March 1923) and was on special duty in work connected with the introduction of the Valuation of Land Enactment (1922) in Federated Malaya States (FMS) in March 1923. He was later revert to his duties as Secretary to the Resident of Selangor. In 1924, he was the Acting Under-Secretary when Sir Frederick James became Governor of the Windward Islands.

=== Straits Settlements ===
In 1923, Hemmant was transferred to the Straits Settlements and held offices of Acting Under-Secretary and Acting Colonial Secretary for various periods. Between 1924 and 1930, he was the Under-Secretary and was appointed Acting Colonial Secretary of Straits Settlements, twice in 1924 and 1928.

=== Chief Secretary of Nigeria ===
In 1930, Hemmant was appointed Chief Secretary to the Government of Nigeria to replace Sir Frank Baddeley who was retiring.

== Personal life and education ==
George Hemmant was born on 13 October 1880 and his parents were Mr and Mrs William Hemmant of Bulimba, Sevenoaks. He married Gladys Evelyn, younger daughter of Mr and Mrs E. A. Knight of Oaklands, St Leonards on 11 June 1925 in London.

Hemmant had a son, Maurice Hemmant.

Hemmant had his education in Cambridge where he took his B.A. degree.

== Retirement ==
Hemmant and his wife retired in 1934 and settled in Sevenoaks.

== Awards and honours ==
George Hemmant was invested with Companion of the Most Distinguished Order of St. Michael and St. George (CMG) in 1929 Birthday Honours.

Government offices
Preceded by Sir Frank Baddeley	Chief Secretary of Nigeria; 1930–1934	Succeeded by John Alexander Maybin
Preceded by Sir Hayes Marriott as Colonial Secretary of Straits Settlements	Acting Colonial Secretary of Straits Settlements; 1928–1929	Succeeded by Sir John Scott as Colonial Secretary of Straits Settlements
Preceded by Sir Frederick Seton James as Colonial Secretary of Straits Settlements	Acting Colonial Secretary of Straits Settlements; 1924	Succeeded by Edward Shaw Hose as Colonial Secretary of Straits Settlements
