= Governor James =

Governor James may refer to:

- Arthur James (politician) (1883–1973), 31st Governor of Pennsylvania
- Fob James (born 1934), 48th Governor of Alabama
- Frederick Seton James (1870–1934), Governor of the Windward Islands from 1924 to 1930
- William H. James (1831–1920), Acting Governor of Nebraska
