= Thomas Church (colonial administrator) =

Colonial Administrator

The Honourable Thomas Church

4th Resident Councillor of Singapore
- In office 4 March 1837 – 20 September 1856
- Preceded by: Sir Samuel George Bonham
- Succeeded by: Henry Somerset MacKenzie

Personal details
- Born: 23 June 1798
- Died: 10 August 1860 (aged 62)
- Parent(s): Thomas and Elizabeth (née Dixon) Church
- Profession: Colonial administrator

Thomas Church (23 June 1798 – 10 August 1860) was a British colonial administrator under the British East India Company. Church started as a writer in Bencoolen (Bengkulu) in 1816 and rose to the high position of Resident Councillor of Singapore before retiring in 1856.

== Career ==
Church was nominated as a "writer" (record the details of accounting, managerial decisions, and activities related to the company) under the British East India Company at Fort Marlborough, Bencoolen (Bengkulu) on 17 April 1816 and started his duties in October 1816. During Church's stay in Bencoolen, he held several offices as Assistant to the Resident of Manna, Assistant to the Judge and Magistrate of Bencoolen and Registrar to the principal native Judicial Court.

With the judicial experience gained during Church's stay in Bencoolen, it subsequently qualified him for important judicial duties as a member of the Straits Court of Judicature, Deputy Resident of Malacca, Accountant and Auditor at Penang, Deputy Collector, Military Paymaster and Acting Collector of Customs.

In 1825, Church was a civil member of the "Eastern Settlements" which consisted of Prince of Wales' Island (Penang), Singapore and Malacca.

From July 1825 until the abolition of Straits Government by Lord William Bentinck (Governor-General of India) in 1830, Church was employed in various important offices (Accountant and Auditor).

Church was transferred to Penang with judge Edward Presgrave and was appointed Deputy Resident of Malacca in 1828. He was there at the start of Naning War, where British enforced their rule on a local chief.

In 1830, Lord William Bentinck hastily reduced the Straits establishment which deprived Church of a lucrative appointment and subsequently forced Church to return to England in October 1831. Back in England, as there was lack of employment of his calibre, he applied to the Court of Directors for active employment.

Church left England in September 1833 and reached Calcutta on 27 January 1834. Within a few days landing in Calcutta, Church was appointed Resident of Penang and as acting Governor of the Straits during the absence of Kenneth Murchison.

Between June 1834 and 25 January 1837, Church was being unjustly superseded and was appointed as acting Assistant of Resident at Penang. The injustice was acknowledged by the Government which on 12 January 1835 granted him Rupees 600 per month, or double the usual allowance to civil servants until an appointment offered suitable to his rank in the public service.

Church was appointed as the Resident Councillor in Singapore from 4 March 1837, and was active in supporting the Singapore Library and participating in many other civil duties. After forty years of civil service, Church retired in September 1856, and due to ill health, he returned to London, where he died on 10 August 1860.

== Family ==
Thomas Church's parents were Thomas Church (1761-1815), a cooper of Old Fish Street and Upper Thames Street in the City of London, and Elizabeth (née Dixon) Church (1772-1847). He was baptized on 22 July 1798 at St Mary Somerset, City of London, and married Elizabeth Scott (1803-1884), the daughter of Robert Scott (of Penang) and Lugia Pereira, in April 1826 in Penang.

Elizabeth Church returned to Singapore after her husband's death in 1860 and died there in 1884.

Government offices
Preceded by Sir Samuel George Bonham	Resident Councillor of Singapore; 1837 – 1856	Succeeded by Henry Somerset MacKenzie
