= List of governors of the Straits Settlements =

The governor of the Straits Settlements was appointed by the British East India Company until 1867, when the Straits Settlements became a Crown colony. Thereafter the governor was appointed by the Colonial Office. The position existed from 1826 to 1946. Between 1942 and 1945 the office was not filled, as the Straits Settlements was under Japanese occupation. From the late 19th century onward, the governor of the Straits Settlements was usually also British High Commissioner for Malaya and Brunei and British Agent for Sarawak and British North Borneo.

== List of British governors (1826–1946) ==
British Straits Settlements
No.	Portrait	Name (Born–Died)	Term of office			Origin	Background or previous appointment	Monarch
No.	Portrait	Name (Born–Died)	Took office	Left office	Duration	Origin	Background or previous appointment	Monarch
1		Robert Fullerton (1773–1831)	27 November 1826	12 November 1830	3 years, 11 months	Edinburgh, Scotland	Second Member of Council, and President of the Board of Trade	George IV
1		Robert Fullerton (1773–1831)	27 November 1826	12 November 1830	3 years, 11 months	Edinburgh, Scotland	Second Member of Council, and President of the Board of Trade	William IV
2		Robert Ibbetson (1789–1880)	12 November 1830	7 December 1833	3 years, 25 days	England	Resident Councillor of Prince of Wales Island	William IV
3		Kenneth Murchison (1794–1854)	7 December 1833	17 November 1836	2 years, 11 months	Scotland	Resident Councillor of Straits Settlements	William IV
4		Sir Samuel George Bonham (1803–1863)	18 November 1836	January 1843	~ 6 years, 1 month	Kent, England	Resident Councillor of Straits Settlements	William IV
4		Sir Samuel George Bonham (1803–1863)	18 November 1836	January 1843	~ 6 years, 1 month	Kent, England	Resident Councillor of Straits Settlements	Victoria
British East India Company								Victoria
5		Major General William John Butterworth (1801–1856)	August 1843	21 March 1855	~ 11 years, 9 months	Unknown	Lieutenant-Colonel of the 38th Madras Regiment	Victoria
6		Edmund Augustus Blundell (1804–1868)	21 March 1855	6 August 1859	4 years, 4 months	Somerset, England	Resident Councillor of Penang	Victoria
India Office								Victoria
7		Major General Sir William Orfeur Cavenagh (1820–1891)	6 August 1859	16 March 1867	7 years, 7 months	Kent, England	British Indian Army	Victoria
Colonial Office								Victoria
8		Major General Sir Harry St. George Ord (1819–1885)	16 March 1867	4 March 1871	3 years, 11 months	Kent, England	Special Commissioner to West Africa	Victoria
—		Major General Edward Archibald Harbord Anson (1826–1925); 1st time Acting	4 March 1871	22 March 1872	1 year and 18 days	London, England	Lieutenant Governor of Penang	Victoria
8		Major General Sir Harry St. George Ord (1819–1885)	22 March 1872	3 November 1873	1 year, 7 months	Kent, England	Colonial administrator	Victoria
—		Major General Edward Archibald Harbord Anson (1826–1925); 2nd time Acting	3 November 1873	4 November 1873	1 day	London, England	Lieutenant Governor of Penang	Victoria
9		Sir Andrew Clarke (1824–1902)	4 November 1873	8 May 1875	1 year, 6 months	Hampshire, England	Director of Works at the Admiralty	Victoria
10		Sir William Jervois (1821–1897)	8 May 1875	3 April 1877	1 year, 10 months	Isle of Wight, England	Colonel of the Royal Engineers	Victoria
—		Major General Edward Archibald Harbord Anson (1826–1925); 3rd time Acting	3 April 1877	August 1877	~ 4 months	London, England	Lieutenant Governor of Penang	Victoria
11		Sir William Cleaver Francis Robinson (1834–1897)	August 1877	10 February 1879	~ 1 year, 5 months	County Westmeath, Ireland	Governor of Western Australia	Victoria
—		Major General Edward Archibald Harbord Anson (1826–1925); 4th time Acting	10 February 1879	16 May 1880	1 year, 3 months	London, England	Lieutenant Governor of Penang	Victoria
12		Sir Frederick Weld (1823–1891)	16 May 1880	17 October 1887	7 years, 5 months	Dorset, England	Governor of Tasmania	Victoria
13		Sir Cecil Clementi Smith (1840–1916)	17 October 1887	30 August 1893	5 years, 10 months	London, England	Colonial Secretary of Straits Settlements	Victoria
—		William Edward Maxwell (1846–1897); Acting	30 August 1893	1 February 1894	5 months and 2 days	unknown	Colonial Secretary of Straits Settlements	Victoria
14		Sir Charles Mitchell (1836–1899); Died while in office	1 February 1894	7 December 1899	5 years, 10 months	London, England	Governor of Natal	Victoria
—		James Alexander Swettenham (1846–1933); Acting	7 December 1899	5 November 1901	1 year, 10 months	Derbyshire, England	Colonial Secretary of Straits Settlements	Victoria
—		James Alexander Swettenham (1846–1933); Acting	7 December 1899	5 November 1901	1 year, 10 months	Derbyshire, England	Colonial Secretary of Straits Settlements	Edward VII
15		Sir Frank Swettenham (1850–1946)	5 November 1901	16 April 1904	2 years, 5 months	Derbyshire, England	Resident-General of the Federated Malay States	Edward VII
16		Sir John Anderson (1858–1918)	16 April 1904	2 September 1911	7 years, 4 months	Aberdeenshire, Scotland	Colonial administrator	Edward VII
16		Sir John Anderson (1858–1918)	16 April 1904	2 September 1911	7 years, 4 months	Aberdeenshire, Scotland	Colonial administrator	George V
17		Sir Arthur Henderson Young (1854–1938)	2 September 1911	17 February 1920	8 years, 5 months	unknown	Resident-General of the Federated Malay States	George V
18		Sir Laurence Guillemard (1862–1951)	17 February 1920	3 June 1927	7 years, 3 months	unknown	Colonial administrator	George V
19		Sir Hugh Clifford (1866–1941)	3 June 1927	21 October 1929	2 years, 4 months	London, England	Governor of British Ceylon	George V
—		Sir John Scott (1878–1946); Acting	21 October 1929	5 February 1930	3 months and 15 days	unknown	Colonial Secretary of Straits Settlements	George V
20		Sir Cecil Clementi (1875–1947)	5 February 1930	17 February 1934	4 years and 12 days	Cawnpore, British India	Governor of Hong Kong	George V
—		Sir Andrew Caldecott (1884–1951); Acting	17 February 1934	9 November 1934	8 months and 23 days	Kent, England	Colonial Secretary of Straits Settlements	George V
		Sir Shenton Thomas (1879–1962)	9 November 1934	15 February 1942	7 years, 3 months	London, England	Governor of the Gold Coast	George V
21		Sir Shenton Thomas (1879–1962)	9 November 1934	15 February 1942	7 years, 3 months	London, England	Governor of the Gold Coast	George V
21		Sir Shenton Thomas (1879–1962)	9 November 1934	15 February 1942	7 years, 3 months	London, England	Governor of the Gold Coast	Edward VIII
21		Sir Shenton Thomas (1879–1962)	9 November 1934	15 February 1942	7 years, 3 months	London, England	Governor of the Gold Coast	George VI
Japanese occupation of Singapore From 15 February 1942 to 12 September 1945.
British Military Administration of the Straits Settlements From 12 September 1945 to 31 March 1946.								George VI
—		Lord Louis Mountbatten (1900–1979); British High Command	12 September 1945	31 March 1946	6 months and 19 days	Berkshire, England	Supreme Allied Commander of the Southeast Asia Theatre	George VI
British Straits Settlements								George VI
21		Sir Shenton Thomas (1879–1962)	12 September 1945	31 March 1946	6 months and 19 days	London, England	Colonial administrator	George VI
Singapore became a separate Crown Colony								George VI

== See also ==
- Chief Secretary (Singapore)
- List of chief secretaries of Singapore
- Legislative Council of the Straits Settlements
- List of governors of Singapore
- History of Singapore
- History of Malaysia
- List of governors of Penang
