= Hayes Marriott =

British colonial administrator (c. 1873-1929)

Sir Hayes Marriott KBE CMG
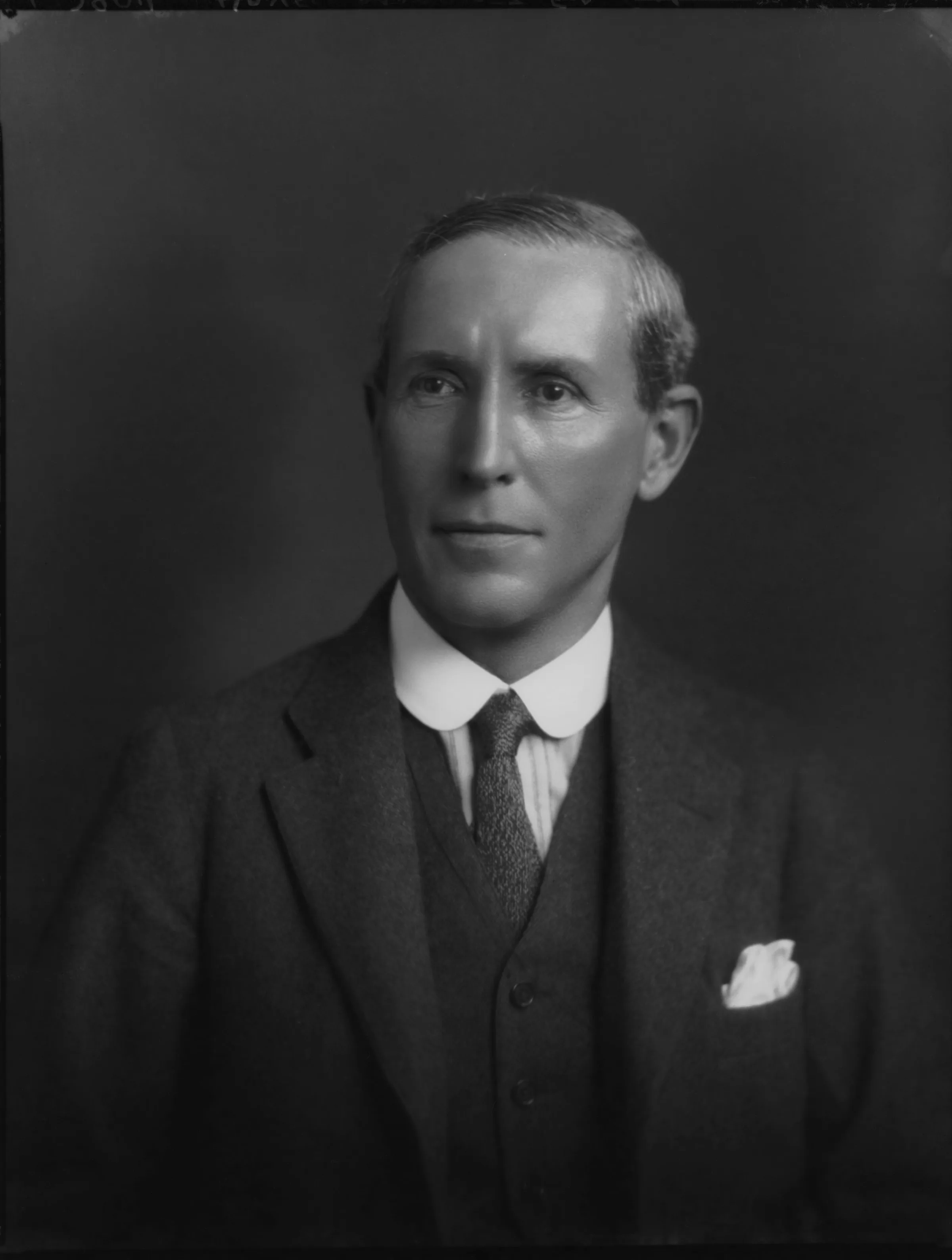
- Marriott in 1927

15th Colonial Secretary of Straits Settlements
- In office 21 November 1925 – 16 December 1928
- Monarch: George V
- Governor: Sir Laurence Guillemard; Sir Hugh Clifford
- Preceded by: Edward Shaw Hose
- Succeeded by: George Hemmant (Acting); Sir John Scott

British General Adviser (Johore)
- In office 1920–1926
- Preceded by: John Fortescue Owen (acting)
- Succeeded by: Charles Walter Hamilton Cochrane

Resident (Melaka) (acting)
- In office 24 May 1911 – 22 Jan 1912
- Preceded by: Littleton Edward Pipe-Wolferstan
- Succeeded by: Walter Cecil Michell (acting)

Personal details
- Born: c. 1873
- Died: 9 February 1929 (aged 55–56)
- Cause of death: Pneumonia
- Spouse: Alice Smith (Lady Marriott) (m. 1908; died 1929)
- Children: John Marriott; Richard Marriott
- Parent: Rev. W. H. Marriott (Vicar of Thrussington) (father)
- Relatives: William Marriott (brother)
- Occupation: Colonial Administrator

Sir Hayes Marriott KBE CMG (c. 1873 – 9 February 1929) was a British colonial administrator. Marriott joined the Straits Settlement Civil Service in 1896 as a cadet and rose to the high position of Colonial Secretary before retiring in 1928.

== Career ==
Marriott joined the Straits Settlement Civil Service in November 1896 as a cadet. Between 1897 and 1900, Marriott was a District Officer at Alor Gajah, Malacca, and from 1905 to 1908, Marriott was appointed as Collector of Land Revenue, Singapore. In 1911, Marriott was appointed as Superintendent of Census and Inspector of Prison was later appointed as the acting Resident of Malacca in the same year till 1912. From 1912 to 1920, Marriott was appointed as Private Secretary to the Governor and the High Commissioner of Malay States, Sir Arthur Young. Marriott also held several posts of Auditor General, Secretary to the High Commissioner and Custodian of Enemy Property, in additional to his own duty, during the time of shortage of manpower due to the World War I. In 1917 to 1918, Marriott was also appointed as Acting Treasurer. Between 1919 and 1928, Marriott was occasionally appointed as the Officer Administering the Government when the Governor was away or Acting Colonial Secretary when the Colonial Secretary is away or vacant. From 18 December 1920 to 1926, Marriott was appointed General Adviser to Johore, and at the same time as acting colonial secretary. From 1925 to 1928, Marriott was finally appointed as the 15th Colonial Secretary of the Straits Settlement, when Mr Edward Shaw Hose retired.

== Family ==
Hayes Marriott's father was Rev. W. H. Marriott, Vicar of Thrussington, in Leicestershire. Hayes Marriott married Alice Smith, daughter of J. R. Smith of Hasholme Hall, Yorkshire on 2 June 1908 in Singapore and had two sons (John and Richard) from the marriage.

== Retirement and death ==
After over thirty years of service in the British Empire, Marriott intended to retire as a Colonial Secretary of the Straits Settlement at the end of 1927. Due to change in the Governor during the middle of 1928, Marriott stayed on for the entire of 1928 to enable Sir Hugh Clifford to take leave in July 1928 with the knowledge that the Government is in safe and experienced hands.

Marriott finally left Singapore for retirement on 16 December 1928. After arriving at England on 26 January 1929, he contacted pneumonia (due to drastic weather change) and died on 9 February 1929. His wife, Lady Marriott also died a week later (16 February) due to pneumonia.

== Honours ==
Marriott was appointed Companion of St. Michael and St. George (CMG) in the 1924 Birthday Honours on 3 June 1924, and Knight Commander of the Most Excellent Order of the British Empire (KBE) in the 1927 Birthday Honours on 3 June 1927.

Government offices
Preceded by Littleton Edward Pipe-Wolferstan	Resident (Melaka) (acting); 1911 – 1912	Succeeded by Walter Cecil Michell (acting)
Preceded by John Fortescue Owen (Acting)	British General Adviser (Johore); 1920 – 1926	Succeeded by Charles Walter Hamilton Cochrane
Preceded by Edward Shaw Hose	Colonial Secretary of Straits Settlements; 1925 – 1928	Succeeded by George Hemmant (Acting); Sir John Scott
