= Thomas Alexander Vans Best =

British politician (1870–1941)

Sir Thomas Alexander Vans Best KCMG KBE
- Best in 1935

Governor of the Windward Islands
- In office 1930–1935
- Preceded by: Sir Frederick Seton James
- Succeeded by: Sir Selwyn MacGregor Grier

Personal details
- Born: 8 October 1870 United Kingdom
- Died: 24 November 1941 (aged 71)
- Spouse: Lady Helena Leopoldine Montagu

Sir Thomas Alexander Vans Best, KCMG, KBE (8 October 1870 – 24 November 1941) was a British colonial administrator.

He was born the son of Dr Alexander Vans Best of Aberdeen, previously a Staff Surgeon in the Bengal Army.

Thomas Vans Best joined the Colonial Service and served as Acting Governor of the Leeward Islands on behalf of Sir Edward Marsh Merewether from 1916 to 1919 and as Colonial Secretary of Trinidad and Tobago from August, 1919.

He was Lieutenant Governor of Malta from 1925 to 1930 and Governor of the Windward Islands from 1930 to 1935.

Best was appointed a Companion of the Order of St Michael and St George (CMG) in the 1916 New Year Honours, and a Commander of the Order of the British Empire (CBE) in 1918 in recognition of war service. He was promoted to Knight Commander of the Order of the British Empire (KBE) in the 1926 Birthday Honours and to Knight Commander of the Order of St Michael and St George (KCMG) in the 1932 New Year Honours.

He married Lady Helena Leopoldine Montagu, the daughter of Rear-Admiral Hon. Victor Alexander Montagu.
