= W. L. Blythe =

Colonial Administrator (1896–1975)

W. L. Blythe CMG
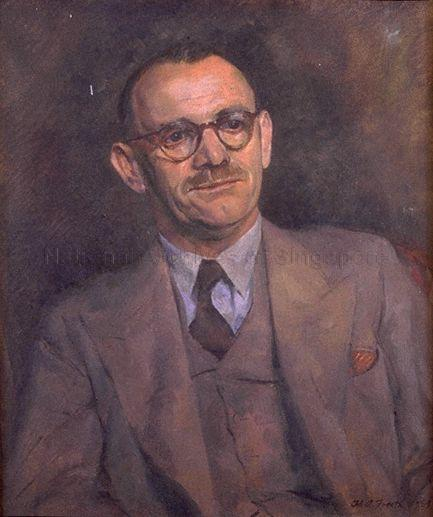
- Portrait of Blythe by H. A. Freeth

2nd Colonial Secretary of Singapore
- In office 30 June 1950 – 30 July 1953
- Monarchs: George VI; Elizabeth II
- Governor: Sir Franklin Gimson; Sir John Nicoll
- Preceded by: Sir Patrick McKerron
- Succeeded by: William Goode

Governor of Singapore (Acting)
- In office 20 March 1952 – 21 April 1952
- Monarch: Elizabeth II
- Preceded by: Sir Franklin Gimson
- Succeeded by: Sir John Nicoll

Personal details
- Born: Wilfred Lawson Blythe; 9 November 1896
- Died: 6 November 1975 (aged 78)
- Spouse: Muriel Gertrude Woodward (m. 1925; died 1969)
- Profession: Colonial administrator

Wilfred Lawson Blythe CMG (9 November 1896 – 6 November 1975) was a British colonial administrator who served as the second Colonial Secretary of Singapore from 30 June 1950 to 30 July 1953.

Blythe joined Malayan Civil Service as a cadet in 1921 and Chinese Protectorate before rising to the high position of Colonial Secretary of Singapore and retired on 30 July 1953.

== Education ==
Blythe completed his education at the Birkenhead Institute and Liverpool University. In 1922, Blythe went to Canton to study Cantonese and has also passed his examinations in Cantonese, Hokkien and Malay.

== Career ==
Blythe joined Malayan Civil Service as a cadet and was attached to Chinese Secretariat at Seremban and then at Kuala Lumpur in 1921.

Between 1922 and before the start of Japan occupation in the Malaya and Singapore, Blythe was appointed as Assistant Protector or Protector of Chinese in Kuala Lumpur, Selangor, Penang, Johore, Negri Sembilan and Singapore in several instants.

While as the assistant Protector of Chinese, Blythe was involved in the bomb incident of D. Richards (Protector of Chinese) in Kuala Lumpur Police Station on 22 January 1925. Both Blythe and the attacker (Wong San, a Chinese woman) had minor injuries while Mr Richards was badly injured. Wong San was later sentence to a 10-year imprisonment.

Blythe was briefly appointed as the Acting Private Secretary to Sir George Maxwell, Chief Secretary of Federated Malay States (1921–1926), in 1925.

In 1929, Blythe was also the Registrar of Societies and First Magistrate. and the Controller of Labour in 1930.

In 1932, Blythe was transferred to Singapore and appointed as Assistant Registrar of Societies and Assistant Secretary of Chinese Affairs, Straits Settlement for brief period of time.

During his tenure in Penang between 1933 and 1934, Blythe was the Municipal Commissioner of George town (Penang). Blythe was asked upon to intervened and acted as arbitrator when the tailors in Penang called for a strike which was later settled.

Between 1935 and 1936, Blythe was the Deputy President of the Municipal Commissioners in George Town (Penang).

Between 1937 and 1947, Blythe was the Assistant Secretary of Chinese Affairs, Malaya.

In 1939, Blythe was also appointed to act as Commissioner of Trade and Customs and Superintendent, Chandu Monpoly (Johore). and the following year as Deputy Controller of Labour (Chinese), S.S. and F.M.S.

In April 1948, Blythe was the Deputy President of the Municipal Commissioners of Singapore and the following year as the President of the Singapore Municipal Commission.

In 1950, Blythe was appointed the Colonial Secretary. During his tenure as Colonial Secretary, Blythe was occasionally sworn in as Officer Administrating the Government when Sir Franklin Gimson (Governor of Singapore) was away. In 1952, Blythe was again appointed as Officer Administrating the Government as Sir Franklin Gimson retired on 20 March and the new governor Sir John Nicoll will only to arrive on 21 April.

In 1953, Blythe finally step down and retires from the post of Colonial Secretary of Singapore on 30 July after servicing 32 years in the Malayan Civil Service.

== Post-retirement ==
Blythe returned to the Malaya in 1955 to write and give talks in 1957 on the Chinese secret societies of Malaya. He released a book "Impact of Chinese Secret Societies in Malaya : A Historical Study" in 1969.

== Personal life ==
Blythe married with Muriel Gertrude Woodward in 1925 and had a daughter (born on 10 July 1927).

Both Mr and Mrs Blythe were active tennis players as they attended tennis tournament organised by the Civil Service Club and State Club.

Blythe died on 6 November 1975.

== Awards and honours ==
Blythe was awarded Companion of St. Michael and St. George (CMG) for his services to Malaya in 1953 New Year Honours.

== Publications ==
- Wilfred Blythe (1 April 1969). Impact of Chinese Secret Societies in Malaya : A Historical Study. Oxford, UK: Oxford University Press. p. 580. ISBN 9780192149749.

Government offices
Preceded by Sir Patrick McKerron; J D M Smith (Acting)	Colonial Secretary of Singapore; 1950 – 1953	Succeeded by Sir William Goode
Preceded by Sir Franklin Gimson as Governor of Singapore	Acting Governor of Singapore; 1952	Succeeded by Sir John Nicoll as Governor of Singapore
