= Edward Bruce Alexander =

British civil servant in Ceylon

Major Edward Bruce Alexander CMG VD

Acting Governor of British Ceylon
- In office 18 October 1925 – 30 November 1925
- Monarch: George V
- Preceded by: Cecil Clementi (Acting governor)
- Succeeded by: Hugh Clifford

Personal details
- Born: 3 March 1872 Mynpoorie, Bengal, British India
- Died: 21 March 1955 (aged 83) London, England

Major Edward Bruce Alexander CMG VD (3 March 1872 – 21 March 1955) was a British civil servant in Ceylon. He served as acting Governor of British Ceylon from October to November 1925.

== Biography ==
Alexander was born in India, where his father, Richard Dundas Alexander, was a member of the Indian Civil Service. Alexander was educated in England, attending Forest School and Trinity College, Oxford. He was a cricketer, playing for the Authentics and the Corinthians. He joined the Ceylon Civil Service at a young age, and continued to play cricket in Ceylon.

During the First World War, he served in France, reaching the rank of major, and was an original member of Toc H.

Alexander returned to Ceylon after the war, and was appointed Controller of Revenue in Ceylon in 1922. He was acting Colonial Secretary from 1925 to 1927, and was acting Governor from 18 October 1925 to 30 November 1925. He was succeeded by Hugh Clifford.

Alexander was appointed a Companion of the Order of St Michael and St George in the 1925 Birthday Honours. He retired in 1927 and returned to England.

In 1899, he married Mabel Eleanor (née Bosanquet). They had two sons and a daughter.

Government offices
Preceded by Cecil Clementi acting governor	Governor of British Ceylon; 1925–1925	Succeeded by Hugh Clifford
