= Ronald MacPherson =

British colonial administrator (1817–1869)

1st Colonial Secretary of Straits Settlements
- In office 1 April 1867 – 6 December 1869
- Preceded by: Position established
- Succeeded by: James Wheeler Woodford Birch

6th Resident Councillor of Singapore
- In office 8 October 1860 – 31 March 1867
- Preceded by: Henry Somerset MacKenzie
- Succeeded by: Position abolished

Personal details
- Born: 14 July 1817 Island of Skye, Scotland
- Died: 6 December 1869 (aged 52) Singapore
- Resting place: Old Bukit Timah Cemetery
- Occupation: Colonial administrator, architect

Military service
- Years of service: 1854–1869
- Rank: Colonel
- Unit: Singapore Volunteer Rifle Corps

Ronald MacPherson (14 July 1817 – 6 December 1869) was a military officer, architect and colonial administrator in Singapore. He is well known for the design of the St Andrew Cathedral.

== Early life and education ==
Born in the Isle of Skye, MacPherson was of Irish-Scots descent. MacPherson was educated at the East India Company's military college in Addiscombe, Croydon between 1834 and 1836.

== Career ==
=== Military ===
MacPherson passed for the Engineers Corps, but as there were few nominations for Engineers Corps. Instead, he was gazetted as 2nd lieutenant in the Madras Artillery on the 10 June 1836 and arrived at India on the 27 November of the same year. In India, he learnt Arabic and Hindustani, studied engineering and helped to prepare the Madras Gunnery Tables, which European artillery companies consulted for many years.

MacPherson served in the First Opium War of 1842 with the Madras Artillery and was later appointed staff officer to the Artillery in the Straits Settlements in 1843.

=== Colonial Service ===
MacPherson started his career in Colonial Service as Executive Engineer and Superintendent of Convicts at Penang in 1849. He constructed many useful works such as Police Office and Court of Requests.

MacPherson was appointed as the first Captain Commandant in 1854–1856 and later Honorary Colonel in 1864 of the Singapore Volunteer Rifle Corps.

Between 1855 and 1857, MacPherson was also the Executive Engineer and Superintendent of Convicts in Singapore.

MacPherson was appointed as the Resident Councillor of Malacca (1858), Penang and Singapore (1860) until 1867 when the British government agreed to establish the Straits Settlements as a distinct Crown Colony as the merchant community and the middle class began agitating against being ruled from British India. MacPherson continued as the 1st Colonial Secretary of the Straits Settlements until his death in 1869.

== St Andrew's Cathedral ==
During his tenure as Executive Engineer, William Butterworth (Governor of Straits Settlement) initiated MacPherson to design a new church (St Andrew Cathedral) in the Gothic Revival style to replace the demolished St Andrew's Church. The completion of the building was overseen by Major John F. A. McNair, John Bennett and W. D. Bayliss in 1861.

A monument cross stands in the south lawn of St Andrew's Cathedral was dedicated to MacPherson.

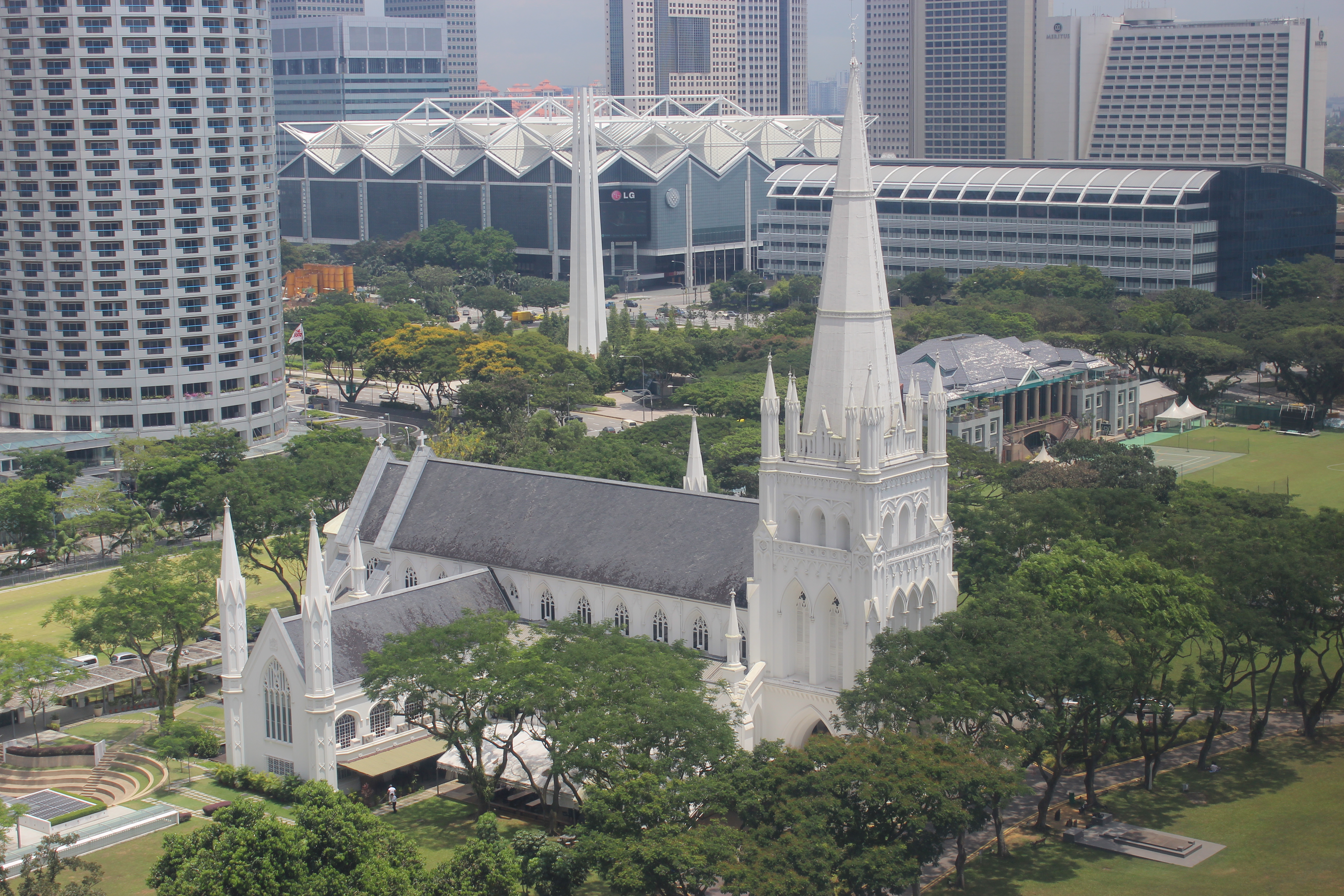
Aerial photograph of St Andrew Cathedral

== Death ==
MacPherson died on 6 December 1869 and was buried at the Old Bukit Timah Cemetery in Singapore.

== Legacy ==
Jalan Klapa was renamed as MacPherson Road in Singapore to commemorate Ronald MacPherson's achievements.

Government offices
New title	Colonial Secretary of Straits Settlements; 1867-1869	Succeeded by James Wheeler Woodford Birch
Preceded by Henry Somerset MacKenzie	Resident Councillors of Singapore; 1860-1867	Post abolished
