= Frank Baddeley =

British Colonial Administrator

Baddeley in 1931.

Sir Frank Morrish Baddeley, KBE CMG (30 November 1874 – 18 April 1966) was a British colonial administrator.

== Life ==
Educated at the Liverpool Institute and Magdalene College, Cambridge, Baddeley joined the Malayan Civil Service in 1897, rising to the rank of Under Secretary of the Straits Settlements. He became Chief Secretary to the Government of Nigeria in 1924. He was acting Governor of Nigeria in 1925, 1927, and in 1928–1929. He represented Nigeria at the 1930 Colonial Office Conference.

He was appointed Companion of the Order of St Michael and St George in the 1925 Birthday Honours, knighted in the 1928 New Year Honours, and appointed Knight Commander of the Order of the British Empire in the 1930 New Year Honours.
