= Frederick George Penney =

Colonial Administrator

9th Colonial Secretary of Straits Settlements
- In office 1 January 1905 – 13 April 1905
- Governor: Sir John Anderson
- Preceded by: Sir William Thomas Taylor
- Succeeded by: Edward Lewis Brockman (acting); Captain Arthur Young

Colonial Treasurer of Straits Settlements
- In office 24 August 1898 – 31 December 1904

Personal details
- Born: c. 1856
- Died: 5 August 1928 (aged 71–72) Bexhill-on-Sea
- Parents: William Penney (father); Louisa Jane Campbell (mother)
- Education: University of Edinburgh
- Profession: Colonial Administrator

Frederick George Penney or Frederick Gordon Penney (c.1856 – 5 August 1928) was a colonial administrator. He was a cadet of Straits Settlement in 1876 and retired as the Colonial Secretary of Straits Settlements in 1906.

== Education ==
Penney graduated from University of Edinburgh with a M.A.

== Personal life ==
He is the son of William Penney and Louisa Jane Campbell.

== Career ==
In 1876, Penney appointed Cadet of Straits Settlement, and in 1879 as Acting Coroner, Singapore.

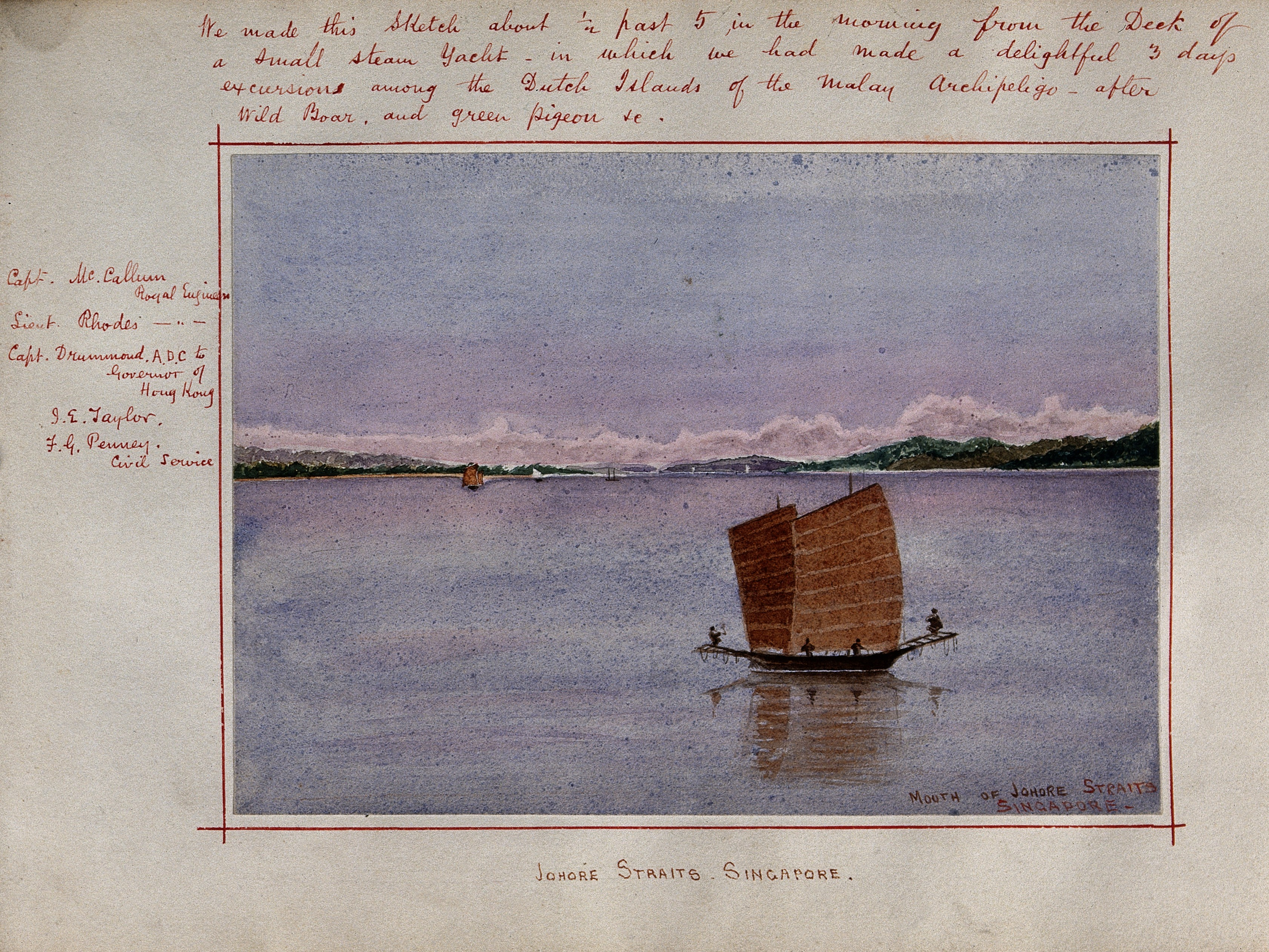
Penney visited the Johore Straits in 1879, with John Edmund Taylor, a fellow civil servant

In 1880, he was the Acting Collector of Land Revenue, Penang. and in 1883 was appointed Second Magistrate and Commissioner of the Court of Requests, Penang and, in the same year, transferred to Singapore as Second Magistrate and Commissioner of the Court of Requests.

In 1884, he was the Acting First Magistrate and Commissioner of the Court of Requests, Singapore and in July 1886 to June 1887, he was Acting Second Assistant Colonial Secretary when Mr E. W. Birch was on leave of absence.

On 23 June 1887, he was appointed as Inspector of Schools for Straits Settlements when Mr E. C. Hill went for a long leave of absence and in 1889, he was the Acting Assistant Colonial Secretary.

On 4 July 1890, he was promoted to Senior District Officer (Province Wellesley) and continue as Acting Assistant Colonial Secretary.

On 12 April 1897, he was appointed Acting Colonial Treasurer and Collector of Stamp Duties and member of the Legislative Council as a consequence of the death of Mr H. A. O'Brien (Acting Colonial Treasurer) and continued as Senior District Officer (Province Wellesley).

On 24 August 1898, he was appointed as Colonial Treasurer and continued as Collector of Stamp Duties.

On 5 July 1904, he was appointed as Resident Councillor of Malacca and continued as Colonial Treasurer and on 1 January 1905, he was appointed as Colonial Secretary to succeed Sir William Thomas Taylor, who was appointed as the Resident General of the Federated Malaya States (F.M.S.).

== Retirement and death ==
On 13 April 1905, Penney took an eight and a half months leave of absence and later retired in 1906 due to poor health. He died on 5 August 1928 at the age of 72.

Government offices
Preceded by Sir William Thomas Taylor	Colonial Secretary of Straits Settlements; 1905	Succeeded by Edward Lewis Brockman (acting); Captain Arthur Young
Preceded by Mr H A O'Brien as Acting Colonial Treasurer	Colonial Treasurer of Straits Settlement; 1898–1904	Unknown
