= Robert Ibbetson =

The Honourable Robert Ibbetson
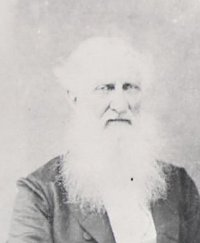

2nd Governor of the Straits Settlements
- In office 12 November 1830 – 7 December 1833
- Monarch: William IV (1830–1837)
- Preceded by: Robert Fullerton
- Succeeded by: Kenneth Murchison

Personal details
- Born: 4 May 1789 England
- Died: 4 November 1880 (aged 91) Portsmouth, England
- Resting place: Highland Road Cemetery, Portsmouth, England
- Spouse(s): Harriet Georgina Hutchings Bennett, née Caunter
- Relations: Myra Grace Kerr (granddaughter)
- Children: Robert, Harriet Grace, Elvira, Samuel Kerr, Georgina Fanny

Robert Ibbetson (4 May 1789 – 4 November 1880) was a colonial governor of the Straits Settlements of Penang, Malacca, and Singapore from 1832 to 1834.

== Biography ==
Born on 4 May 1789. Little is known of his parents, in 1804 his father took him to the offices of the East India Company in Leadenhall Street, London to thank the directors for giving Robert a cadet-ship with their company, in Penang. Steadily climbed the ranks within the company. Robert Ibbetson joined the service in 1804 as a writer. In 1807 he was appointed an assistant in the Secretary's Office. In 1808 he was appointed to assistant in the Collector's Office. In 1810 he was made Deputy Collector at Malacca and promoted in 1810 to Collector and his responsibilities expanded to include Paymaster and Commissary of Provisions, at Malacca. In 1811 he was Factor, Paymaster and Storekeeper. In 1814 he was Junior Merchant and Commissary for the Recovery of Small Debts.

In 1817 Ibbetson married a widow, Harriet Georgina Hutchings Bennett, in Penang; she was a daughter of the late George Caunter, acting superintendent of Penang. That same year Ibbetson was promoted to Senior Merchant and Sheriff. In 1820 he was Paymaster and Storekeeper and Suptd of the company's Law Suits. In 1824 he was Secretary and acting Accountant.

By the time from 3 February 1825, he was Provisional Member of Council for the Straits Settlements in Malacca. In 1826 he was Fourth in Council and Resident Councillor at Malacca, Ibbetson had been Resident Councillor at Penang from 1826, In 1827 his responsibilities expanded to include Suptd of Landed Tenures, Collector of Quit Rents, and Civil & Marine Warehouse Keeper. In 1828 he was made Second in Council. In 1829 he was assisted by James William Salmond, Second Assistant to the Resident Councillor at Penang. Prior to Governor Fullerton's move of the seat of the Straits Government from Penang to Singapore on 12 November 1829, after which time Ibbetson assumed the role of governor of Penang, as the sole survivor of the officials appointed to the new Penang Presidency in 1805.

The departure of the last Governor Robert Fullerton is also recorded in the Gazette. The issue of 29 August 1829 carries the following notification:

The Honorable the Governor, being about to proceed to Singapore and Malacca, NOTICE is hereby given that this station will cease to be the seat of Government from the date of his departure, and the charge of the settlement will devolve upon the Honorable Robert Ibbetson, Resident Councillor; to whom all local references will be made.

On 12 November 1830, he became the 2nd Governor of the Straits Settlements and Treasurer of the Presidency of the Straits Settlements of Singapore, Penang and Malacca for three years. Not much is known about his influence on the history of the Straits Settlements, but it is said that at that time Government business there was performed in a slovenly manner, with property registration being as impenetrable as the jungle which surrounded many properties, and with Government accounts being very casually audited.

== Retirement and death ==
About 1841, he returned to England, In 1848 he was living in Marylebone, London, but later returned to Penang where he would remained till well into his eighties. At some point his nutmeg plantations were converted to cocoa, after the price of nutmeg fell, and the trees became plagued with disease. There are several records of him during the 1860s, dining with the then Lieutenant Governor of Penang, Major-General Archibald Edward Harbord Anson.

Around April 1874 he returned to England for the last time and settled in Portsmouth. He died on 4 November 1880 and was buried at Highland Road Cemetery.

Political offices
Preceded by Robert Fullerton	Governor of the Straits Settlements; 12 November 1830 – 7 December 1833	Succeeded by Kenneth Murchison
