= Edward Shaw Hose =

British colonial administrator (1871–1946)

Edward Shaw Hose CMG
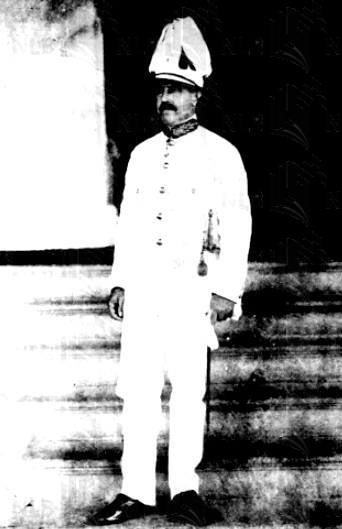
- Hose in 1925

14th Colonial Secretary of Straits Settlements
- In office 2 April 1924 – 21 November 1925
- Monarch: George V
- Governor: Sir Laurence Guillemard
- Preceded by: Sir Frederick Seton James; George Hemmant (Acting)
- Succeeded by: Sir Hayes Marriott

British Resident of Negri Sembilan
- In office 1921–1925
- Preceded by: Arthur Henry Lemon; J. R. O. Aldworth (acting)
- Succeeded by: Ernest Charteris Holford Wolff

Personal details
- Born: 25 November 1871 Malacca, Straits Settlements
- Died: 12 September 1946 (aged 74) Normandy, Surrey, England
- Parent: Right Rev. George Frederick Hose (father)
- Profession: Colonial Administrator

Edward Shaw Hose, CMG (25 November 1871 – 12 September 1946) was a colonial administrator. He served his civil service career in Federated Malay States and Straits Settlements and was the British Resident of Negri Sembilan and Colonial Secretary of Straits Settlements.

== Career ==
E S Hose joined the Malayan Civil Service as a junior officer in Perak in 1891. He served five months in 1904 as Magistrate in Singapore. Between 1904 and 1921, he was in charge of many Federal departments in Food, Labour and Agriculture. In 1919, he was the District Officer of Lower Perak and Director of Food Production (Kuala Lumpur). In 1921, he was appointed as the British Resident of Negri Sembilan. In 1924, he was appointed as the Colonial Secretary of Straits Settlements to succeed Sir Frederick Seton James whom became the Governor of the Windward Islands.

== Personal life ==
E S Hose was born on 25 November 1871 in Malacca to the Right Rev. George Frederick Hose, who was Chaplain at Malacca from 1868 to 1872 and later Bishop of Singapore from 1881 to 1908. Before entering the civil service, he was educated at Blundell's School in Tiverton, Devon.

E S Hose died on 12 September 1946 at his home in Normandy, Surrey near Guildford.

== Awards and honour ==
E S Hose was invested with Companion of the Most Distinguished Order of St. Michael and St. George (CMG) during the 1924 New Year Honours.

Government offices
Preceded by Sir Frederick Seton James; George Hemmant (Acting)	Colonial Secretary of Straits Settlements; 1924–1925	Succeeded by Sir Hayes Marriott
Preceded by Arthur Henry Lemon; J. R. O. Aldworth (Acting)	British Resident of Negri Sembilan; 1921–1925	Succeeded by Ernest Charteris Holford Wolff
