= Alexander Sym Small =

Colonial administrator (1887–1944)

Sir Alexander Sym Small CMG KBE
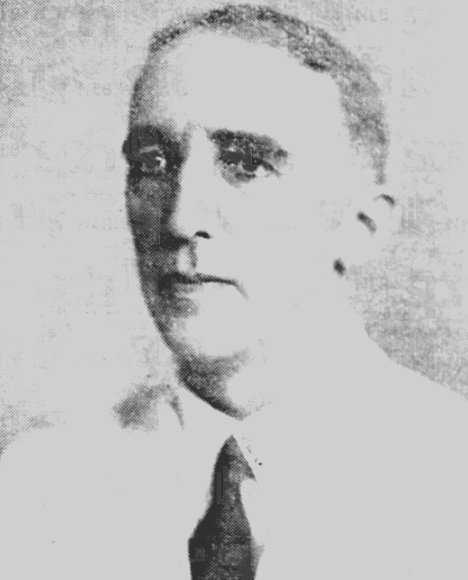

18th Colonial Secretary of Straits Settlements
- In office 7 December 1935 – 19 January 1940
- Monarchs: George V Edward VIII; George VI
- Governor: Sir Shenton Thomas
- Preceded by: Sir Andrew Caldecott
- Succeeded by: Stanley Wilson Jones

Personal details
- Born: 3 November 1887 Motherwell, North Lanarkshire, Scotland
- Died: 13 August 1944 (aged 56) Cottesloe, Perth, Western Australia
- Spouse: Hazel Stubbs (m. 1922–1944)
- Children: Irene Small (daughter)
- Education: Glasgow University
- Profession: Colonial Administrator

Sir Alexander Sym Small CMG KBE (3 November 1887 – 13 August 1944) was a colonial administrator. He joined the Malayan Civil Service and was a cadet in January 1911 and served most of his Civil Service career in Federated Malay States (FMS) and Straits Settlements (SS). He retired as the Colonial Secretary of Straits Settlements in 1940.

== Career ==
=== Federated Malay States and Straits Settlements ===
Small came to Malaya as a cadet in January 1911 and was appointed Acting Assistant Secretary to British Resident of Selangor. In 1912, he was the Acting District Officer in Kuala Langat and Acting Secretary to the British Resident of Negri Sembilan in 1913. In 1918, he was seconded for service in Johore and held the post of Acting Assistant Adviser (Endau) and Acting Assistant Adviser (Muar) in 1920. In 1921, he was Acting Assistant Director of Education (SS and FMS) and temporarily as Commissioner of Customs (Johore). Between 1923 and 1926, he was Acting Treasurer (FMS) and State Treasurer (Selangor). Towards the end of 1926, he took up the duties of Town Planning Administrator in Kuala Lumpur. In March 1927, he was Financial Commissioner and Auditor (Johore). Between 1929 and 1930, he was made Acting Treasurer (SS) and later given additional responsibilities as Financial Adviser and Treasurer (FMS). In June 1932 to 1935, he was Treasurer (SS).

=== Colonial Secretary of Straits Settlements ===
In December 1935, he was given the post of Colonial Secretary of Straits Settlements to succeed Andrew Caldecott whom was to be the new Governor of Hong Kong. During his tenure as Colonial Secretary, he was sworn in in several occasions as Officer Administrating the Government when the Governor was away. In 1940, Small retired and handed over the position of Colonial Secretary of Straits Settlements to Mr. Stanley Wilson Jones.

== Post-retirement ==
After retirement, Small settled near Perth, Australia. He was on the point of leaving for India to take up the position to represent the Colonies on the Eastern Supplies Council in New Delhi when the Pacific war broke out, but he voluntarily returned to Singapore on 22 December 1941 from the safety of Australia to do his bit for the defence of Singapore in which his working life was spent. He remained in Singapore till January 1942 and left for India.

He served as honorary director of the West Australian division of the Red Cross Society of the Bureau for Wounded, Missing and Prisoners of War and was also a vice-president of the Malayan and Far Eastern Association of Western Australia.

== Awards and honour ==
Small was invested with Companion of the Most Distinguished Order of St. Michael and St. George (CMG) in 1937 and with Knight Commander of the Most Excellent Order of the British Empire (KBE) in 1939.

== Personal life ==
Small was educated in Dalziel High School and Glasgow University where he graduated in law and took the degrees of BSc and M.A. in 1908.

Small married Hazel Stubbs, eldest daughter of Sydney Stubbs, on 4 January 1922.

Government offices
Preceded by Sir Andrew Caldecott	Colonial Secretary of Straits Settlements; 1935–1940	Succeeded by Stanley Wilson Jones
