= Kenneth Murchison =

British colonial administrator in Southeast Asia (1794–1854)

The Honourable Kenneth Murchison
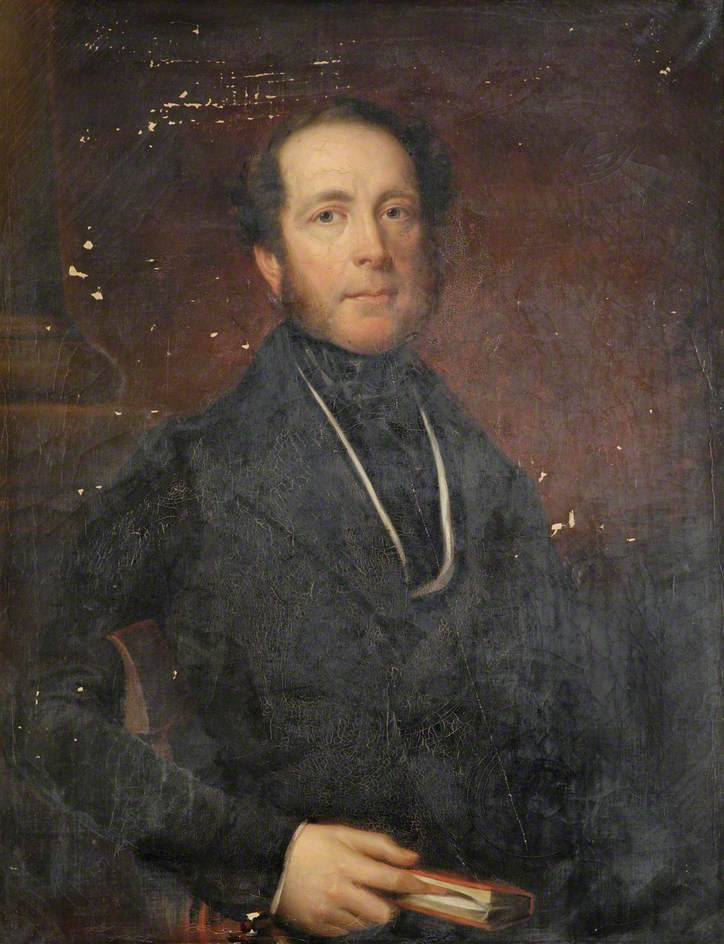

3rd Governor of the Straits Settlements
- In office 7 December 1833 – 17 November 1836
- Monarch: William IV (1830–1837)
- Preceded by: Robert Ibbetson
- Succeeded by: Samuel George Bonham

Resident Councillor of Straits Settlements
- In office 29 November 1827 – 6 December 1833
- Preceded by: John Prince
- Succeeded by: Samuel George Bonham

Personal details
- Born: 1794 Scotland
- Died: 1 August 1854 (aged 59–60) Bathampton, Bath, Somerset, England
- Spouse(s): Charlotte Pryce (m. 1815; died 1816) Anne Nesham (m. 1826; died 1846)
- Children: 3
- Relatives: Roderick Murchison (brother)
- Occupation: Colonial administrator

Kenneth Murchison (1794 - 1 August 1854) was a Scottish colonial administrator who served as the Resident Councillor of Penang and Resident Councillor of Singapore, as well as the third Governor of the Straits Settlements.

== Early life ==
Kenneth Murchison was born in Scotland in 1794 to Kenneth Murchison. The Murchisons were a Scottish landowning family that suffered from their support of the House of Stuart and participation in Jacobite uprisings. His elder brother was geologist Roderick Murchison. His father died in 1796, and his widowed mother married Robert Murray MacGregor. The family moved from Ross-shire in Scotland to Bathampton in Somerset England for his father to recuperate from an illness, but he would die there in 1796. His mother then took the family to Edinburgh and remarried.

== Career ==
Murchison began his working career with the East India Company. He was appointed the Resident Councillor of Penang on 29 November 1827, he was also appointed the Resident Councillor of Singapore. While he was Resident in Penang, he conducted a geological survey of Penang on behalf of his brother Roderick Murchison, who was President of the Geological Society. He became the Governor of the Straits Settlements on 7 December 1833, however, he spent much of his time as Governor outside of Southeast Asia, and the administrative duty was performed by his deputy George Bonham. Bonham took over as Governor on 18 November 1836.

== Personal life ==
Murchison was married to Charlotte Pryce in 1815 and had a daughter Charlotte. His first wife died in 1816, and he married Anne Nesham in 1826 with whom he had two surviving sons, Kenneth-Robert and Roderick.

Political offices
| Preceded by John Prince | Resident Councillor of Straits Settlements; 1827 – 1833 | Succeeded by Samuel George Bonham |
| Preceded by Robert Ibbetson | Governor of the Straits Settlements; 1833 – 1836 | Succeeded by Samuel George Bonham |
