= Frederick Seton James =

Colonial Administrator

Sir Frederick Seton James KCMG KBE
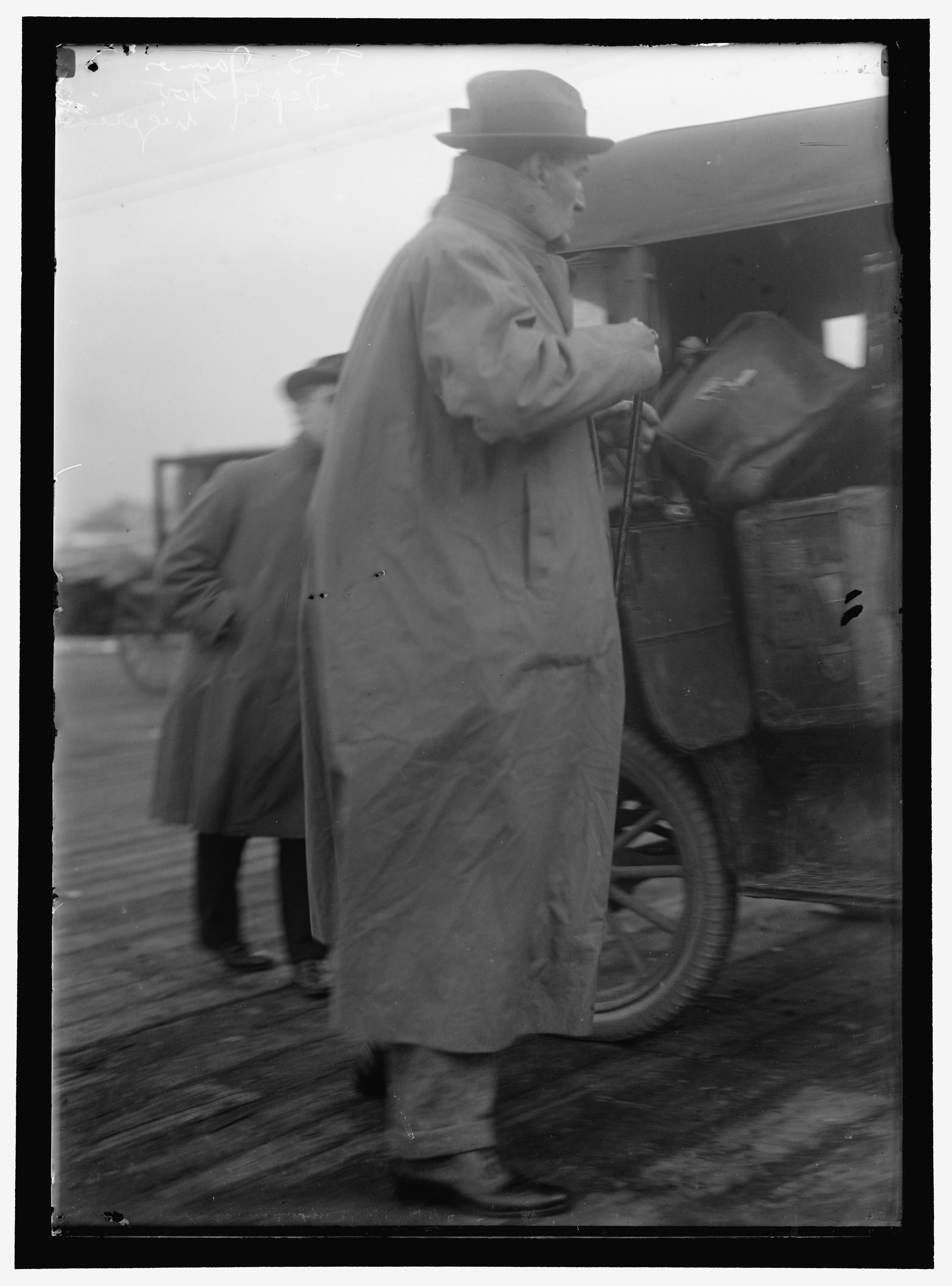

Governor of the Windward Islands
- In office March 1924 – 1930
- Preceded by: Sir George Basil Haddon-Smith
- Succeeded by: Sir Thomas Alexander Vans Best

13th Colonial Secretary of the Straits Settlements
- In office 1916 – 11 March 1924 (Note: 7 March 1924 is a Friday, 11 March will the Tuesday said in the article.)
- Monarch: George V
- Governor: Sir Arthur Young; Sir Laurence Guillemard
- Preceded by: Richard James Wilkinson
- Succeeded by: George Hemmant (Acting); Edward Shaw Hose

Personal details
- Born: 8 April 1870; Northumberland, United Kingdom
- Died: 13 February 1934 (aged 63); Chichester, Sussex, England
- Spouse: Doris Basevi (m. 1917–1934)
- Children: 2 sons
- Profession: Colonial Administrator

Sir Frederick Seton James KCMG KBE (8 April 1870 – 13 February 1934) was a British colonial administrator. He was the Colonial Secretary of the Straits Settlements (1916–1924) and Governor of the Windward Islands (1924–1930).

== Education ==
James was educated at Charterhouse School and overseas.

== Career ==
=== Colonial Nigeria ===
He joined the Colonial Service and was posted to the Niger Coast Protectorate in 1896 as Assistant District Commissioner and was in charge at Opobo and Akwete in 1897. He served as Tavelling Commissioner in 1897 and in the expedition against the Ekuris, Cross River in 1898. He settled disputes in Qua country after Central Division Expedition, 1899, received thanks of Mr Chamberlain. He served as Divisional Commissioner in 1901 and was Intelligence and Political Officer with the Aro Field Force in 1901-02 and was mentioned in dispatches for this and received the thanks of the Director of Military Intelligence and Secretary of State in connection with the preparation of map subsequent to Aro operations. He was also with the Kwale Field Force and was appointed Acting Secretary and Deputy High Commissioner in 1905. He became Provincial Commissioner and Member of the Executive and Legislative Councils of Southern Nigeria in 1906 and was Deputy Governor in 1907 and 1908. He was Acting Colonial Secretary several times and acted as Governor and Commander-in-Chief of Southern Nigeria during 1912.

After Southern Nigeria was joined with Northern Nigeria in 1914, he was made Administrator of the Colony of Lagos until 1916. He was returning home on the SS Appam when it was captured as a prize by the German raider SMS Möwe.

=== Federated Malay States and Straits Settlements ===
From 1916 to 1924, he was Colonial Secretary of the Straits Settlements and was a Food Controller for Malaya between December 1918 and May 1919. He was the Officer Administering the Government and High Commissioner for the Federated Malay States (F.M.S.) between August 1919 and January 1920, and was officiating Chief Secretary F.M.S. 1920.

=== Windward Islands ===
In 1924, he was transferred to the Caribbean as Governor of the Windward Islands, where he served until a serious accident in 1930 that force him to retire.

== Awards and honours ==
He was appointed Companion of the Order of St Michael and St George (CMG) in 1902, Knight Commander of the Order of the British Empire (KBE) in 1923 and Knight Commander of the Order of St Michael and St George (KCMG) in 1929.

== Personal life ==
He was born the son of William James, lately of the 42nd Royal Highlanders, of Otterburn Tower, Northumberland. He had married Doris Basevi on 20 January 1917 and had two sons.

== Retirement ==
He retired at Ellerslie near Chichester, Sussex and died in 1934.

== Notes ==
Government offices
Preceded by Sir George Basil Haddon-Smith	Governor of the Windward Islands; 1924 – 1930	Succeeded by Sir Thomas Alexander Vans Best
Preceded by Richard James Wilkinson	Colonial Secretary of Straits Settlements; 1916 – 1924	Succeeded by George Hemmant (Acting); Edward Shaw Hose
