= John Scott (colonial administrator) =

British colonial administrator (1878-1946)

Sir John Scott KBE CMG
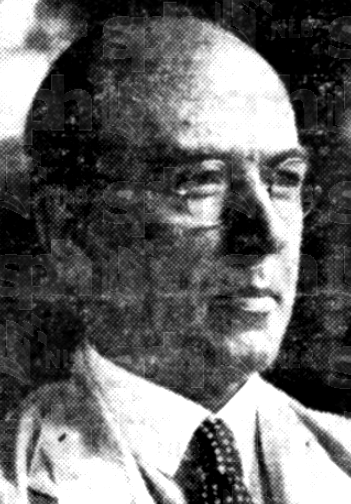

16th Colonial Secretary of Straits Settlements
- In office 9 February 1929 – 23 May 1933
- Monarch: George V
- Governor: Sir Hugh Clifford; Sir Cecil Clementi
- Preceded by: Sir Hayes Marriott; George Hemmant (Acting)
- Succeeded by: Sir Andrew Caldecott

Acting Governor of the Straits Settlements
- In office 21 October 1929 – 5 February 1930
- Preceded by: Sir Hugh Clifford
- Succeeded by: Sir Cecil Clementi

Chief Secretary of Tanganyika Territory
- In office January 1924 – 1928

Acting Governor of Tanganyika Territory
- In office 1924 – 5 March 1925

Deputy Chief Secretary of Nigeria
- In office February 1921 – 1923

Personal details
- Born: 24 April 1878
- Died: 19 January 1946 (aged 67)
- Spouse: Mary Kathrine Adams (m. 1905; died 1941)
- Parent: Canon John Scott (father)
- Education: King's College, Cambridge
- Occupation: Colonial Administrator

Sir John Scott KBE CMG (24 April 1878 – 19 January 1946) was a British colonial administrator. Scott joined the Ceylon Civil Service as a cadet in 1901 before retiring as Colonial Secretary of the Straits Settlement in 1933.

== Early life and education ==
John Scott was born on 24 April 1878, the eldest son of Canon John Scott, Vicar of St Mary's Church, Hull, then St John the Evangelist's Church, Leeds.

He was educated at Leeds Grammar School, Bath College, and King's College, Cambridge, where he matriculated in 1897, graduating B.A. in 1900.

== Career ==
Scott joined the Ceylon Civil Service in November 1901, was appointed principal assistant colonial secretary in April 1917 and have been in Ceylon till 1921 when he was appointed Deputy Chief Secretary of Nigeria.

Between 1924 and 1928, he was the Chief Secretary of Tanganyika Territory and acting Governor (1924 – 5 March 1925)

He was appointed as Colonial Secretary of Straits Settlements in 1929. During his tenure as Colonial Secretary of Straits Settlements, he was sworn in as Deputy-Governor for several occasions during the absence from the Settlement of H. E. Governor. In October 1929, Scott was again sworn in as Officer Administering the Government as Sir Hugh Clifford whose sudden decision to resign from the post of Governor of Straits Settlement. This is due to Lady Clifford's gravely illness and had to leave for England. Scott resumed his post as Colonial Secretary of Straits Settlements when Sir Cecil Clementi sworn in as Governor of Straits Settlement on 5 February 1930. On 23 May 1933, Scott retired and hand over the post of Colonial Secretary of Straits Settlements to Andrew Caldecott.

== Post-retirement ==
Scott and his wife resided at Manor House, Hartford, Huntingdon after Scott's retirement in 1933.

== Personal life ==
Scott married Mary Kathrine Adams, daughter of Francis Adams of Greswold, Worcestershire in 1905 and Mary died in 1941. He died on 19 January 1946.

== Awards and honours ==
John Scott was invested with Companion of the Most Distinguished Order of St. Michael and St. George (CMG) in 1923 and Knight Commander of the Most Excellent Order of the British Empire (KBE) in 1932.

- Companion of Order of St Michael and St George (CMG) (1923)
- Knight Commander of the Order of the British Empire (KBE) - Sir (1932)

Government offices
Preceded by Sir Hayes Marriott; George Hemmant (Acting)	Colonial Secretary of Straits Settlements; 1929–1933	Succeeded by Sir Andrew Caldecott
Preceded by Sir Hugh Clifford	Acting Governor of the Straits Settlements; 1929–1930	Succeeded by Sir Cecil Clementi
Preceded by –	Chief Secretary of Tanganyika Territory; 1924–1928	Succeeded by –
Preceded by Sir Horace Byatt	Acting Governor of Tanganyika Territory; 1924–1925	Succeeded by Donald Charles Cameron
Preceded by –	Deputy Chief Secretary of Nigeria; 1921–1923	Succeeded by –
