= Edward Anson =

British Army officer, administrator (1826–1925)

Major-General Sir Edward Anson KCMG JP
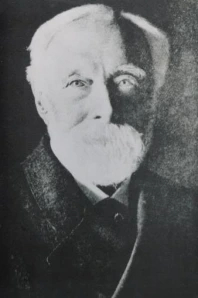

Lieutenant Governor of Penang
- In office 1867–1882
- Preceded by: Major General Henry Stuart Man
- Succeeded by: Major John Frederick Adolphus McNair

Acting Governor of the Straits Settlements
- In office 10 February 1879 – 16 May 1880
- Preceded by: Sir William Cleaver Francis Robinson
- Succeeded by: Sir Frederick Aloysius Weld
- In office 3 April 1877 – August 1877
- Preceded by: Sir William Jervois
- Succeeded by: Sir William Cleaver Francis Robinson
- In office 3 November 1873 – 4 November 1873
- Preceded by: Sir Harry St. George Ord
- Succeeded by: Sir Andrew Clarke
- In office 4 March 1871 – 22 March 1872
- Preceded by: Sir Harry St. George Ord
- Succeeded by: Sir Harry St. George Ord

Personal details
- Born: 16 April 1826 Devonshire Place, London, England
- Died: 26 February 1925 (aged 98) Hastings, England
- Spouses: Elizabeth Mary Bourchier (m. 1851; died 1891); Isabella Jane Armistead (m. 1906; died 1923)
- Children: 3
- Parent: Major-General Sir William Anson, 1st Baronet (father)
- Occupation: Colonial administrator; British Army officer

Major-General Sir Archibald Edward Harbord Anson KCMG JP (16 April 1826 – 26 February 1925) was a British Army officer from the Anson family.

== Background and education ==
Anson was born at 32 Devonshire Place, London, the youngest son of Major-General Sir William Anson, 1st Baronet, and Louisa Frances Mary Dickenson, only child of John Dickenson, by Mary Hamilton his wife, only child of Charles Hamilton, son and heir of Lord Archibald Hamilton, 7th son of William, 3rd Duke of Hamilton. He had three brothers and three sisters, one of whom was his twin sister Louisa Frances Maria. He was taught Latin grammar by his father before he went to school. In 1834 he went to Reverend Dr. Pincknay's School and later in 1837 to Mr. Miller's school on Woolwich Common.

== Career ==
Anson's military experience began from 1844 to 1847. He served in England, Ireland and Scotland from 1847 to 1855, Crimea 1855, Mauritius 1857–1862, and Madagascar 1862–1865. He returned to England and, after serving with the army in India, was appointed as the last Lieutenant Governor of Penang from 1867 to 1882. In his memoirs About Others and Myself, he describes the feeling of depression upon his appointment as Penang's Resident Councillor. It was during his appointment that the Penang Riots occurred. When the riots ended he negotiated a peace agreement between the contending parties; Red Flag and Tua Pek Kong members against the White Flag and the Ghee Hin. He was the acting Governor of Straits Settlements on several occasions; 4 March 1871 – 22 March 1872, 3 November 1873 – 4 November 1873, 3 April 1877 – 29 October 1877 and 10 February 1879 – 16 May 1880. Upon retirement from the army, he was appointed as an honorary major-general. He later served as Sussex Inspector-General of Police and was a justice of the peace.

== Family ==
Anson married in Limerick on 9 January 1851 to Elizabeth Mary Bourchier (died 23 September 1891), daughter of Richard Bourchier, and by her, he had two sons and one daughter: Archibald John George Anson (1851–1929), Elizabeth Mary Louisa Anson (1852–1934), and John William Henry Anson (1856–1889). He married again on 15 May 1906 to Isabelle Jane Armistead (died 11 May 1923), daughter of Robert Armistead of Dunscar, Lancashire.

Sir Edward Anson died, aged 98, in February 1925 and is buried at Hastings Borough Cemetery, Hastings, East Sussex.

== Awards and honours ==
Anson was invested with Companion of the Most Distinguished Order of St. Michael and St. George (CMG) in 1876 and Knight Commander of the Most Distinguished Order of St. Michael and St. George (KCMG) in 1882.

== See also ==
- Anson baronets
- Corresp: Actions of Perak Expeditionary Force post-murder of Birch
