= Hugh Clifford (colonial administrator) =

British colonial administrator (1866–1941)

Sir Hugh Clifford GCMG GBE
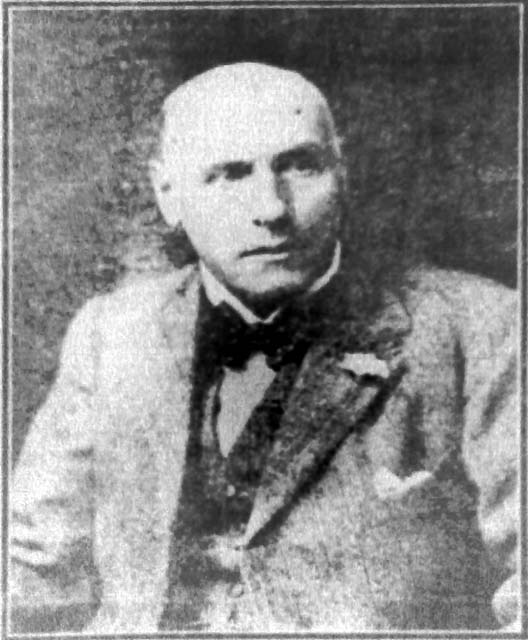

19th Governor of the Straits Settlements
- In office 3 June 1927 – 21 October 1929
- Monarch: George V
- Preceded by: Sir Laurence Guillemard
- Succeeded by: Sir John Scott (Acting); Sir Cecil Clementi

24th Governor of British Ceylon
- In office 30 November 1925 – June 1927
- Monarch: George V
- Preceded by: Edward Bruce Alexander (Acting)
- Succeeded by: Arthur George Murchison Fletcher (Acting)

Governor of Nigeria
- In office 8 August 1919 – 13 November 1925
- Monarch: George V
- Preceded by: Sir Frederick Lugard (Governor-General of Nigeria)
- Succeeded by: Sir Graeme Thomson

Governor of Gold Coast
- In office 26 December 1912 – 1 April 1919
- Monarch: George V
- Preceded by: James Jamieson Thorburn; Herbert Bryan (Acting)
- Succeeded by: Alexander Ransford Slater

Acting Governor of British Ceylon
- In office 11 July 1907 – 24 August 1907
- Monarch: Edward VII
- Preceded by: Henry Arthur Blake
- Succeeded by: Henry Edward McCallum

5th Governor of North Borneo
- In office 1900–1901
- Monarch: Victoria
- Preceded by: Leicester P. Beaufort
- Succeeded by: Ernest W. Birch

Personal details
- Born: 5 March 1866 Roehampton, London, England, United Kingdom
- Died: 18 December 1941 (aged 75) Roehampton, London, England, United Kingdom
- Spouse(s): Minna à Beckett (m. 1896; died 1907) Elizabeth de la Pasture (m. 1910; died 1941)
- Children: 3
- Parent(s): Henry Hugh Clifford; Josephine Elizabeth Anstice
- Profession: Colonial administrator

Sir Hugh Charles Clifford (5 March 1866 – 18 December 1941) was a British colonial administrator who had held several governorships.

== Early life ==
Clifford was born in Roehampton, London, the sixth of the eight children of Major-General Sir Henry Hugh Clifford and his wife Josephine Elizabeth, née Anstice; his grandfather was Hugh Clifford, 7th Baron Clifford of Chudleigh.

== Career ==
Clifford intended to follow his father, Sir Henry Hugh Clifford, a distinguished British Army general, into the military, but later decided to join the civil service in the Straits Settlements, with the assistance of his relative Sir Frederick Weld, the then Governor of the Straits Settlements and also the British High Commissioner in Malaya. He was later transferred to the British Protectorate of the Federated Malay States. Clifford arrived in Malaya in 1883, aged 17.

He first became a cadet in the State of Perak. During his twenty years there and on the east coast of the Malay Peninsula in Pahang, Clifford socialised with the local Malays and studied their language and culture deeply. He came to sympathise strongly with and admire certain aspects of the traditional indigenous cultures, while recognising that their transformation as a consequence of the colonial project which he served was inevitable. He was a Government agent of Pahang (1887–1888), Superintendent of Ulu Pahang (1889), served as British Resident at Pahang, 1896–1900 and 1901–1903, and Governor of North Borneo, 1900–1901.

In 1903, he left Malaya to take the post of Colonial Secretary of Trinidad and Tobago. Later he was appointed Governor of British Ceylon (1907–1912), Governor of the Gold Coast, 1912–1919, Nigeria, 1919–1925, and Ceylon, 1925–1927. During his service in Malaya and afterwards he wrote numerous stories, reflections and novels primarily about Malayan life, many of them imbued with an ambivalent nostalgia. His last posting was, for him, a welcome return to the Malaya he loved, as Governor of the Straits Settlements and British High Commissioner in Malaya, where he served from 1927 until 1929, after which Lady Clifford's ill-health forced his retirement. Alongside his other books he wrote Farther India (the book title itself is referencing an old term referring to Southeast Asia) which chronicles European explorations and discoveries in Southeast Asia.

== Personal life ==
On 15 April 1896, Clifford married Minna à Beckett, the only child of Gilbert Arthur à Beckett. Before her death on 14 January 1907, they had one son and two daughters:

- Hugh Gilbert Francis Clifford (1897–1916), who was killed on 1 July 1916, on the first day of the Battle of the Somme, aged 19.
- Mary Agnes Philippa Clifford (1898–1978), who married Maj.-Gen. Sir Noel Galway Holmes, a son of Capt. Harry W. Holmes, in 1920.
- Monica Elizabeth Mary Clifford (1903–1965), who married Maj. Cecil Edward Trafford, son of Edward Southwell Trafford and Hon. Eleanor Mary Petre (a daughter of the 12th Baron Petre), in 1925. After his death, she married Maj. Richard Desiré Girouard, a son of Maj.-Gen. Sir Edward Percy Cranwell Girouard and widower of Blanche Girouard (née Lady Blanche Beresford), in 1952.

On 24 September 1910 Clifford remarried, to Elizabeth Lydia Rosabelle Bonham, CBE, daughter of Edward Bonham of Bramling, Kent, a British consul. A Catholic, she was the widow of Henry Philip Ducarel de la Pasture of Llandogo Priory, Monmouthshire. Clifford thus became stepfather to E. M. Delafield, author of the Provincial Lady series.

Clifford died peacefully on 18 December 1941 in his native Roehampton. His widow, Elizabeth, died on 30 October 1945.

== Legacy ==
Several schools in Malaysia are named Clifford School in his honour, such as;

- SK Clifford, Kuala Lipis
- SMK Clifford, Kuala Lipis
- SK Clifford, Kuala Kangsar
- SMK Clifford, Kuala Kangsar

Clifford Pier in Singapore was built between 1927 and 1933, and was named after Sir Hugh Clifford when he was the former Governor of the Straits Settlements between 1927 and 1930. It was opened on 3 June 1933.

=== In popular culture ===
Clifford is briefly referred to in V. S. Naipaul's The Mimic Men. Though he was Colonial Secretary of Trinidad and Tobago (second in command to the Governor), in the book he is named as a former Governor of Isabella, a fictitious Caribbean island based on Trinidad. He was depicted by David Abraham in 2022 Malaysian epic Mat Kilau.

He was a friend of Joseph Conrad. In 1914, Conrad dedicated his novel “Chance” to Clifford, commenting that his “steadfast friendship is responsible for the existence of these pages”.

=== Honours ===
Clifford was appointed a Companion of the Order of St Michael and St George (CMG) in 1900, promoted to Knight Commander of the Order (KCMG) in the 1909 Birthday Honours, and further promoted to Knight Grand Cross of the Order (GCMG) in the 1921 Birthday Honours, and appointed a Knight Grand Cross of the Order of the British Empire (GBE) in the 1925 Birthday Honours.

== Publications ==
- A Dictionary of the Malay Language (1894–1902). Co-authored with Frank Swettenham, the dictionary, which was published in stages between 1894 and 1902, was abandoned after the letter 'G' as by then it had been made redundant by the publication of R.J. Wilkinson's A Malay English Dictionary.
- Studies in Brown Humanity: Being Scrawls and Smudges in Sepia, White, and Yellow (1898).
- Clifford, Hugh (1911) The Downfall of the Gods. Historical novel about the decline of the Khmer Empire in the 13th century AD. London, John Murray.
- Clifford, Hugh (1970) In a corner of Asia; being tales and impressions of men and things in the Malay Peninsula. Freeport, New York : Books for Libraries Press.
- Clifford, Hugh (1978) Journal of a mission to Pahang : 15 January to 11 April 1887. Honolulu : University of Hawaii, Southeast Asian Studies Program.
- Clifford, Hugh (1989) Saleh : a prince of Malaya. Singapore : Oxford University Press.

Originally published: A prince of Malaya. New York : Harper & Brothers, 1926.

- Clifford, Hugh (1989) In Court and Kampung. Singapore : Graham Brash (Pte.) Ltd. ISBN 9971-4-9199-0

First published as: East coast etchings. Singapore : Straits Times Press, 1896.

- Clifford, Hugh (1992) Report of an expedition into Trengganu and Kelantan in 1895. Kuala Lumpur : MBRAS.

"First published in the Journal of the Malayan Branch of the Royal Asiatic Society, v. 34 pt. 1 in 1961" --T.p. verso.

- Clifford, Hugh (1993) At the court of Pelesu and other Malayan stories. Kuala Lumpur : Oxford University Press, 1993.

First published as: Stories by Sir Hugh Clifford. Kuala Lumpur : Oxford University Press, 1966.

"An expedition to Kelantan and Trengganu : 1895"--cover title.

Government offices
| Preceded by John Pickersgill Rodger | British Resident of Pahang; 1896–1900 | Succeeded by Arthur Butler |
| Preceded by D.H. Wise | British Resident of Pahang; 1901–1905 | Succeeded by Cecil Wray |
| Preceded by Leicester Paul Beaufort | Governor of North Borneo; 1900–1901 | Succeeded by Sir Ernest Woodford Birch |
| Preceded by Henry Arthur Blake | Acting Governor of Ceylon; 1907 | Succeeded by Henry Edward McCallum |
| Preceded by Herbert Bryan (acting) | Governor of Gold Coast; 1912–1919 | Succeeded by Sir Alexander Ransford Slater (acting) |
| Preceded by Sir Frederick Lugard as Governor-General of Nigeria | Governor of Nigeria; 1919–1925 | Succeeded by Sir Graeme Thomson |
| Preceded by Edward Bruce Alexander acting governor | Governor of Ceylon; 1925–1927 | Succeeded by Arthur George Murchison Fletcher acting governor |
| Preceded by Sir Laurence Nunns Guillemard | Governor of Straits Settlements and British High Commissioner in Malaya; 1927–1930 | Succeeded by Sir John Scott (Acting); Sir Cecil Clementi |
