= George Bonham (disambiguation) =

George Bonham (1803–1863) was Governor of Hong Kong.

George Bonham may also refer to:

- Sir George Francis Bonham (1847–1927), British diplomat, ambassador to Serbia and Switzerland
- Sir (George) Martin Anthony Bonham, 5th Baronet (born 1945) of the Bonham baronets

== See also ==
- Bonham (disambiguation)
