= William Bonham =

William Bonham may refer to:

- William Bonham, High Sheriff of Wiltshire for 1514
- Sir William Bonham, High Sheriff of Essex in 1526
- William Bonham (MP) (1513–1547 or later), MP for Maldon
- Bill Bonham (born 1948), American baseball player

== See also ==
- Bonham (disambiguation)
