= Governor Blundell =

Governor Blundell may refer to:

- Edmund Augustus Blundell (1804–1868), 6th Governor of the Straits Settlements from 1855 to 1859
- Denis Blundell (1907–1984), 12th Governor-General of New Zealand from 1972 to 1977
