= Harry Ord =

British colonial administrator (1819–1885)

Major-General Sir Harry Ord GCMG CB
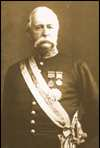
- In his official uniform as Governor of Western Australia

10th Governor of Western Australia
- In office 12 November 1877 – 9 April 1880
- Preceded by: Sir William Robinson
- Succeeded by: Sir William Robinson

8th Governor of the Straits Settlements
- In office 16 March 1867 – 4 November 1873
- Monarch: Queen Victoria
- Colonial Secretary: Ronald MacPherson; James W.W. Birch
- Preceded by: Sir William Orfeur Cavenagh
- Succeeded by: Sir Andrew Clarke

Governor of Bermuda
- In office 1861–1864
- Preceded by: Freeman Murray
- Succeeded by: William Munroe

Personal details
- Born: 17 June 1819 North Cray, Kent, England
- Died: 20 August 1885 (aged 66) Homburg, Germany
- Cause of death: Heart attack
- Resting place: Fornham St Martin
- Spouse: Julia Graham (m. 1846)
- Relations: Craven Ord (paternal grandfather)
- Children: 3
- Parents: Henry Gough Ord (father); Louisa Latham (mother)
- Occupation: Colonial administrator

Sir Harry St George Ord GCMG CB (17 June 1819 – 20 August 1885) was a British colonial administrator who served as Governor of Bermuda between 1861 and 1864, Governor of the Straits Settlements between 1867 and 1873, and Governor of Western Australia between 1877 and 1880.

== Education and career ==
Ord was the son of Henry Gough Ord and grandson of Craven Ord (1756–1832) of Greenstead Hall, Essex, a prominent antiquarian. He was educated at the Royal Military Academy at Woolwich, (1835–1837). He served in the Royal Engineers, (1837–1856), principally in the West Indies, West Africa, and the Anglo-French expedition to the Baltic (1854), during the Crimean War.

Ord later held many important colonial posts, including:

- Commissioner of the Gold Coast (1855–1856)
- Commissioner at the Courts of Paris and The Hague (1856–1857)
- Governor of Dominica (1857–1861)
- Governor of Bermuda (1861–1864)
- Special Commissioner to West Africa (1864–1867)
- Governor of the Straits Settlements (1867–1873)
- Governor of Western Australia (1877–1880)

== Governor of Straits Settlements ==
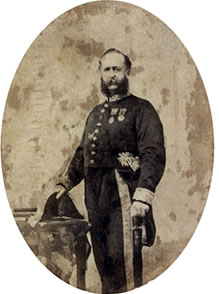
The official picture of Sir Harry Ord as the Governor of the Straits Settlements

Ord, whom the second Colonial Office appointed in 1867 as the Governor of the Straits Settlements, was at first given no instructions regarding the Colony's relations with the Malay States. His appointment did not start well; he would arrive at the Settlements two weeks before his term began, and by the time he was inaugurated, had managed to offend almost everyone in the capital including Chief Justice Designate Peter Benson Maxwell with his crusty demeanor and insistence on being referred to as 'Excellency'. He was unpopular in the Straits Settlements, but was an ambitious and energetic man, who was ready to do what he could to restore order and promote trade in the Peninsula. Conditions in Malaya at that time were extremely unsettled. Within months of his arrival, representatives of the leading firms had formed the Straits Settlement Association under the leadership of John Crawfurd, which vigorously opposed any increase in government power and would bombard his administration with numerous petitions to the House of Lords criticising many of his policies.

More pressing however were the numerous quarrels of the Malays, intensified by feuds between competing groups of Chinese miners, and the links of the Chinese with the British settlements threatened to involve these too in the trouble. After some experience of negotiating with Malays and Siamese, Ord worked out a policy under which he proposed to share the supervision of the Peninsula between Britain and Siam. This policy was disapproved by the Colonial Office, and Ord was directed to abstain from all interference in the affairs of the Malay States.

== Personal life ==
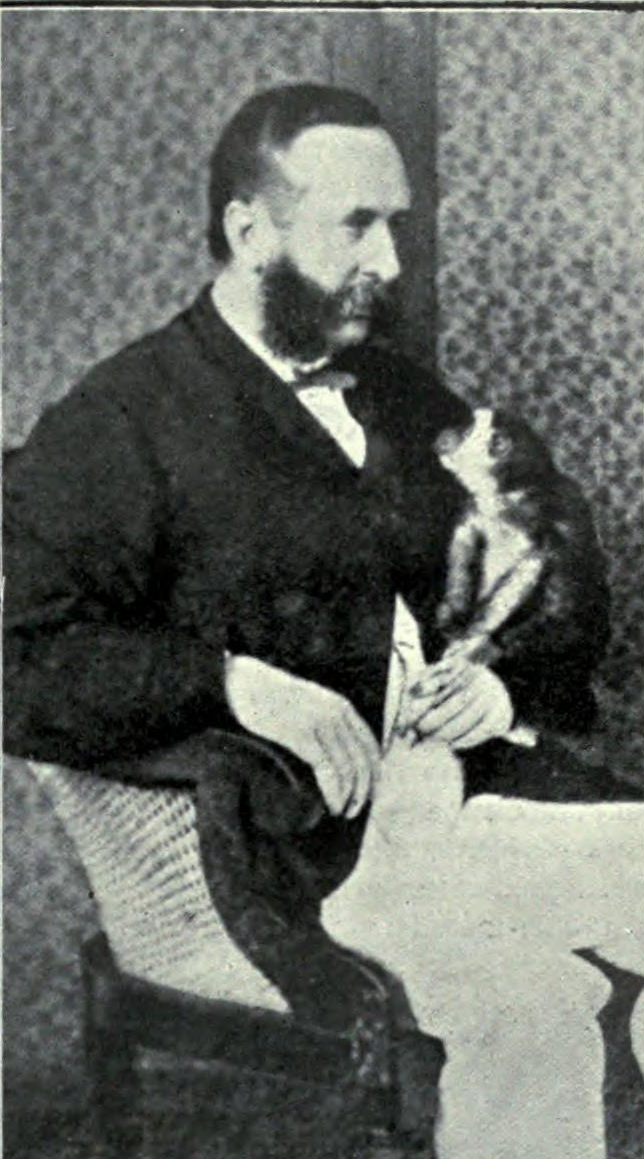
Harry Ord in 1869 with a primate.

Ord married Julia Graham of Exmouth daughter of Admiral James Carpenterin on 28 June 1846 by whom he had three sons.

Ord died on 20 August 1885 from heart attack and was buried in the churchyard of St. Martin's parish church in Fornham St. Martin, Suffolk, England.

== Legacy ==
The village institute in Fornham was built in Ord's memory with funds donated by the Abu Bakar of Johor.

The Ord River in the Kimberley region of Western Australia and Ord Street, Fremantle were named in his honour.

== Awards ==
- K.C.M.G., 1877
- G.C.M.G., 1881

== Sources ==
- Colonial Office List, various list, DNB
- One Hundred Years of Singapore (1819)
- C.D. Cowan, Nineteenth Century Malaya: The Origins of British Political Control, (1961)

Government offices
Preceded by Freeman Murray	Governor of Bermuda; 1861–1864	Succeeded by William Munroe
Preceded by Sir William Orfeur Cavenagh	Governor of Straits Settlements; 1867–1873	Succeeded by Sir Andrew Clarke
Preceded by Sir William Robinson	Governor of Western Australia; 1877–1880	Succeeded by Sir William Robinson
