= William John Butterworth =

Colonial Administrator

Major-General William John Butterworth CB
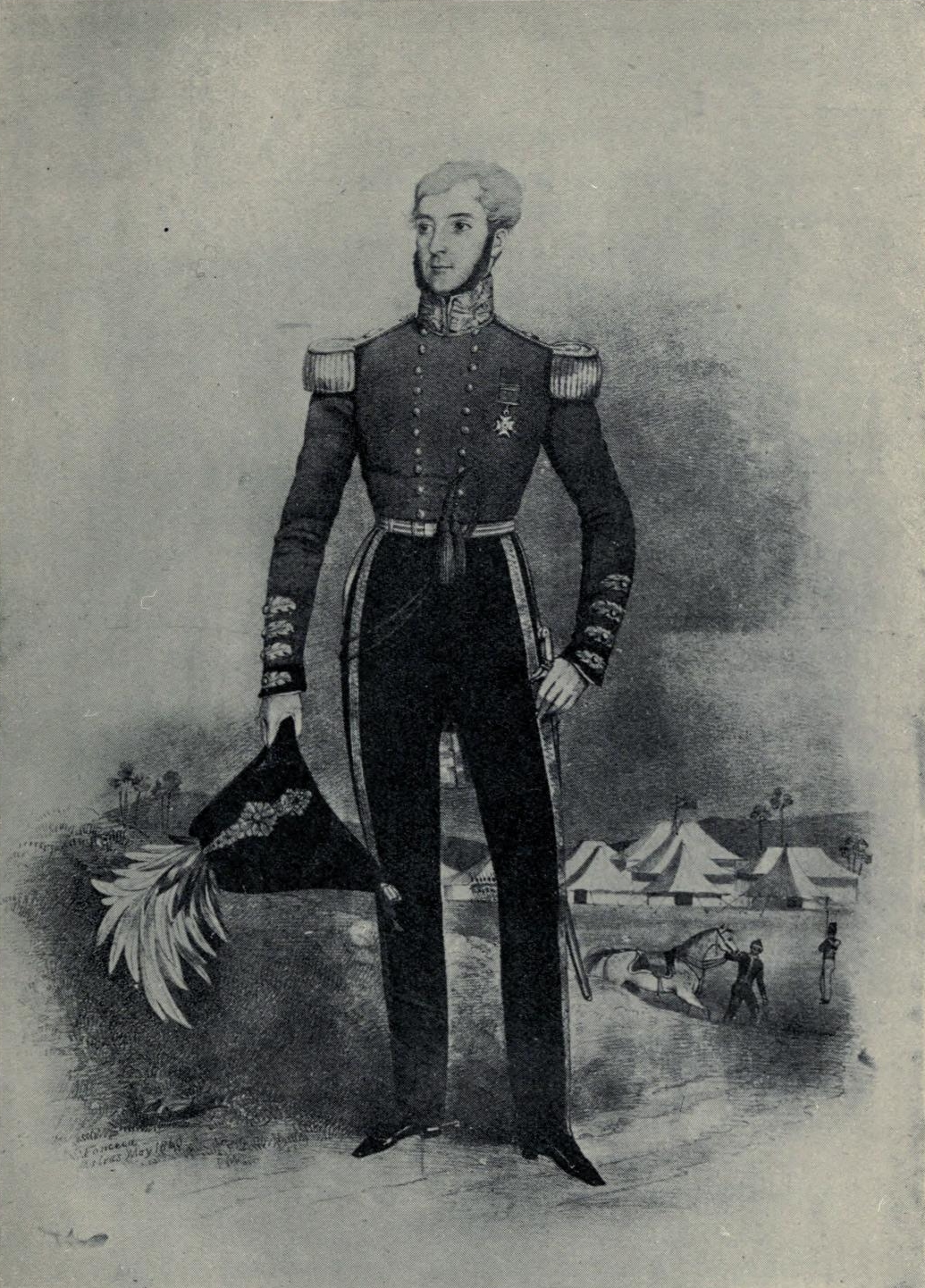

5th Governor of the Straits Settlements
- In office August 1843 – 21 March 1855
- Monarch: Queen Victoria
- Preceded by: Sir Samuel George Bonham
- Succeeded by: Edmund Augustus Blundell

Personal details
- Born: 10 June 1801
- Died: 4 November 1856 (aged 55)
- Parents: Captain William Butterworth (father); Ann Hodgkinson (mother)
- Profession: Colonial administrator, Military officer

Major-General William John Butterworth CB (10 June 1801 – 4 November 1856) was the governor of the Straits Settlements from August 1843 to 21 March 1855. In 1851, when the Straits Settlements were transferred from the authority of the Governor of Bengal to be directly under the control of the Governor-General of India, Butterworth remained as governor.

== Career ==
Butterworth joined the army in Madras and rose to the rank of lieutenant-colonel in the 38th Madras Regiment. While he was governor of the Straits Settlements, Butterworth was instrumental in establishing the Singapore Volunteer Corps. Butterworth was later promoted to major general in 1855.

== Personal life ==
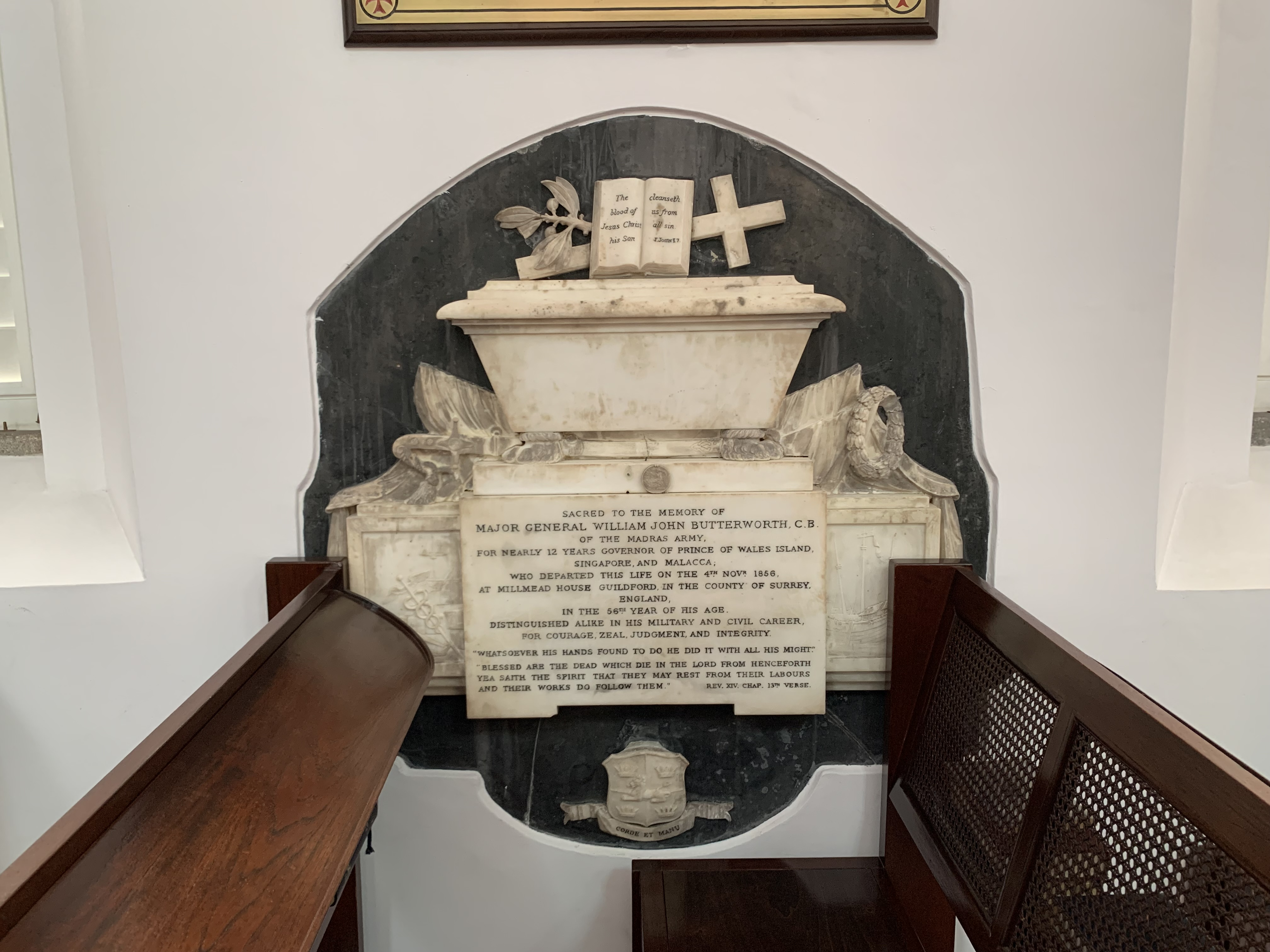
Butterworth's memorial inside the Saint Andrew's Cathedral, Singapore

Butterworth's parents were Captain William Butterworth RN and his wife Ann (née Hodgkinson). Captain Butterworth died at the Battle of Trafalgar in 1805.

== Awards and honours ==
Butterworth was appointed a Companion of the Order of the Bath (CB) in the 1838 Coronation Honours.

== Legacy ==
The town of Butterworth, Penang is named after him.

Government offices
Preceded by Samuel George Bonham	Governor of the Straits Settlements; 1843 – 1855	Succeeded by Edmund Augustus Blundell
