= Edmund Augustus Blundell =

Colonial administrator

6th Governor of the Straits Settlements
- In office 21 March 1855 – 6 August 1859
- Monarch: Queen Victoria
- Preceded by: Major General William John Butterworth
- Succeeded by: Major General Sir William Orfeur Cavenagh

Resident Councillor of Penang
- In office 1849–1855

Resident Councillor of Malacca
- In office 1847–1849

Commissioner of Tenasserim
- In office 1833–1843

Personal details
- Born: 8 August 1804 Taunton, Somerset, England
- Died: 12 October 1868 (aged 64) Harrogate, Yorkshire, England
- Spouse: Mellor Mynors Farmer
- Parents: William Blundell (father); Mary Ann Horniblow (mother)
- Profession: Colonial administrator

Edmund Augustus Blundell (8 August 1804 – 12 October 1868) was a British colonial administrator who served as governor of the Straits Settlement from 1855 to 1859. He was the resident councillor of Malacca and Penang prior to his governorship.

== Early life and education ==
Edmund Augustus Blundell was educated at the East India Company's Addiscombe Military Seminary.

== Career ==
Blundell arrived in Penang on 6 August 1821, and took office as the administrative officer and collector of customs. Blundell succeeded A.D. Maingy as the British Commissioner at Tanintharyi and served from 1834 to 1843. He was transferred back to the Straits Settlements on 3 June 1843, as he was appointed to replace George Bonham as governor, but his appointment was nullified. He served as resident councillor of Malacca and Penang. He became acting governor of the Straits Settlements in 1852, as William John Butterworth was on leave for two years; Butterworth returned in 1854.

Blundell served as governor of the Straits Settlements from 1855 to 1859. As governor Blundell initially supported penal transportation from India to the Straits Settlements, but came to oppose it by 1857. He disliked the Chinese population of Singapore and described them as "dangerous to the lives and property of all persons within the immediate vicinity of the uproar".

Whilst in Asia he had a Burmese mistress who he had 11 children with. He gave them his name and sent them to be educated in Calcutta and England. He married Mellor Mynors Farmer on 22 January 1861 after he had returned to England.

== Works cited ==
=== Books ===
- Anderson, Clare (2007). The Indian Uprising of 1857-8: Prisons, Prisoners and Rebellion. Anthem Press. ISBN 9781843312499.

=== Journals ===
- Cherry, Haydon (2016). "The State in Vietnam". Journal of Vietnamese Studies. 11 (4). University of California Press: 1–16. doi:10.2307/26377917. JSTOR 26377917.
- Li, Yi (2016). "Governing the Chinese in multi-ethnic colonial Burma between the 1890s and 1920s". South East Asia Research. 24 (1). SOAS University of London: 135–154. doi:10.2307/26372031. JSTOR 26372031.
- Mills, L.; Turnbull, Constance; Bassett, D. (1960). "British Malaya 1824-67". Journal of the Malaysian Branch of the Royal Asiatic Society. 33 (3). Malaysian Branch of the Royal Asiatic Society: 1–424. doi:10.2307/41505499. JSTOR 41505499.
- Rai, Rajesh (2013). "The 1857 Panic and the Fabrication of an Indian 'Menace' in Singapore". Modern Asian Studies. 47 (2). Cambridge University Press: 365–405. doi:10.2307/23359825. JSTOR 23359825.

=== Web ===
- Singh, Jatswan (1992). The Origins of British Burma: Arakan and Tenasserim, 1826-1852 (Thesis). University of Malaya.

Government offices
Preceded by William John Butterworth	Governor of the Straits Settlements; 1855–1859	Succeeded by William Orfeur Cavenagh
