= Craven Ord =

English antiquarian

Craven Ord (1756–1832) was an English antiquarian. He was particularly noted for his brass rubbings.

== Life ==
The younger son of Harry Ord, of the king's remembrancer's office, by Anne, daughter of Francis Hutchinson of Barnard Castle, County Durham, he was born in London in 1756; his uncle, Robert Ord, was Chief Baron of the Scottish Exchequer. To 1829 Ord resided mainly at Greenstead Hall in Essex (near Greenstead Green), where most of his children were born; he died at Woolwich Common in January 1832.

Ord was elected a Fellow of the Society of Antiquaries of London on 26 January 1775, and of the Royal Society on 3 May 1787. He was for several years vice-president of the Society of Antiquaries.

== Works ==
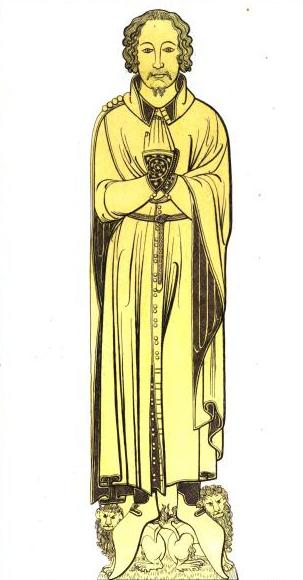
Engraving after a 1780 brass rubbing by Craven Ord from King's Lynn Minster, the brass having been removed by the early 19th century

Ord's life was mainly devoted to antiquarian researches, but he published nothing separately. He contributed to Archæologia. Ord's support was acknowledged by John Nichols, by Gideon Algernon Mantell, and by George Ormerod in their county histories (respectively of Leicestershire, Surrey, and Cheshire).

With Sir John Cullum, Ord assisted Richard Gough in his major work Sepulchral Monuments of Great Britain; in September 1780 he went on a tour in search of church brasses in East Anglia, with Gough and Cullum. His method of obtaining impressions of brasses involved: French paper kept damp in a specially prepared case; printer's ink; and rags. He inked the brass, wiped it clean, laid on the paper, covered it with some thicknesses of cloth, and then trod on it. He finished the outlines at home, cut out the figures, and pasted them in a large portfolio. His collection of impressions of brasses, bound in two volumes, in deal boards over six feet in height, was purchased by Thorpe the bookseller in 1830.

== Legacy ==
Ord's library was mostly dispersed in June 1829, on the occasion of his leaving England for the sake of his health; at the same time was sold some of his historical manuscripts. His Registrum de Bury, temp. Edward III was purchased by Frederic Madden for £126, and his Liber Garderobæ ab anno 18 Edw. II ad annum 15 Edw. III by Thorpe for £110 15s. His Suffolk collections in twenty folio volumes went to Thorpe and then the British Museum, with a series of illustrative drawings. He had acquired drawings by Robert Hawes and Isaac Johnson.

A second sale of Ord's manuscripts took place in January 1830, when many small ancient deeds were sold in bags; many of them had previously belonged to Thomas Martin the Thetford antiquary, and were acquired by Ord for a few shillings. The collections of Francis Douce and of Sir Thomas Phillipps were substantially built up from Ord's sale. The remainder of his library was sold after his death, in May 1832. At the sale John Gage bought a monumental brass that had been in Gorleston church, and returned it.

== Family ==
Ord married, in June 1784, Mary Smith, daughter of John Redman of Greenstead Hall, Essex, by whom he had five sons:

1. Rev. Craven Ord (1786–1836), vicar of Wigtoft, Lincolnshire, 1809, prebendary of Lincoln, 1814, married in 1814 Margaret Blagrave, a niece of Lady Cullum, wife of Sir John Cullum, succeeded his father in his property at Greenstead, and died 14 December 1836;
2. Major Robert Hutchinson Ord, K.H., of the Royal Artillery, who married in 1817 Elizabeth Blagrave, a sister of Margaret;
3. Captain William Redman Ord of the Royal Engineers;
4. John Ord, M.D., of Hertford;
5. Captain Harry Gough Ord, father of Sir Harry St. George Ord.

There was one daughter, Harriot Mary, who married in 1815 Rev. George Hughes.

== Notes ==
Attribution

This article incorporates text from a publication now in the public domain: Lee, Sidney, ed. (1895). "Ord, Craven". Dictionary of National Biography. Vol. 42. London: Smith, Elder & Co.
