= Orfeur Cavenagh =

British colonial administrator (1820–1891)

Orfeur Cavenagh KCSI
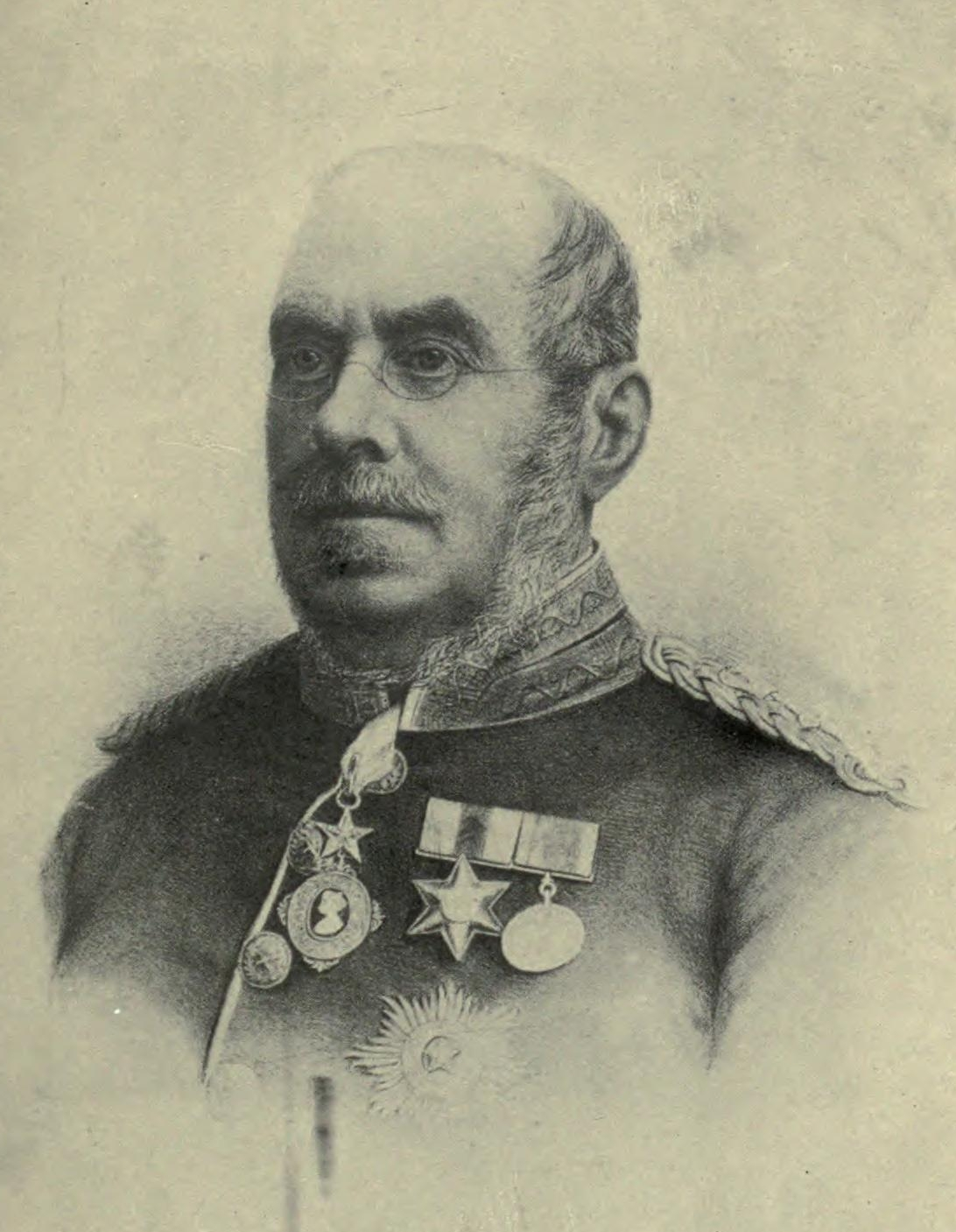
- 1921 portrait of Cavenagh

7th Governor of Straits Settlements
- In office 6 August 1859 – 16 March 1867
- Monarch: Queen Victoria
- Preceded by: Edmund Augustus Blundell
- Succeeded by: Harry Ord

Personal details
- Born: 8 October 1820 Hythe, Kent
- Died: 3 July 1891 (aged 70) St. Aubyn, Sussex
- Spouse: Elizabeth Marshall Moriarty (m. 1842–1891)
- Children: 2
- Profession: Colonial administrator, British Army officer
- Awards: Knight Commander of the Order of the Star of India

Military service
- Allegiance: United Kingdom
- Branch/service: British Indian Army
- Rank: General
- Battles/wars: Gwalior campaign First Anglo-Sikh War; Indian Rebellion

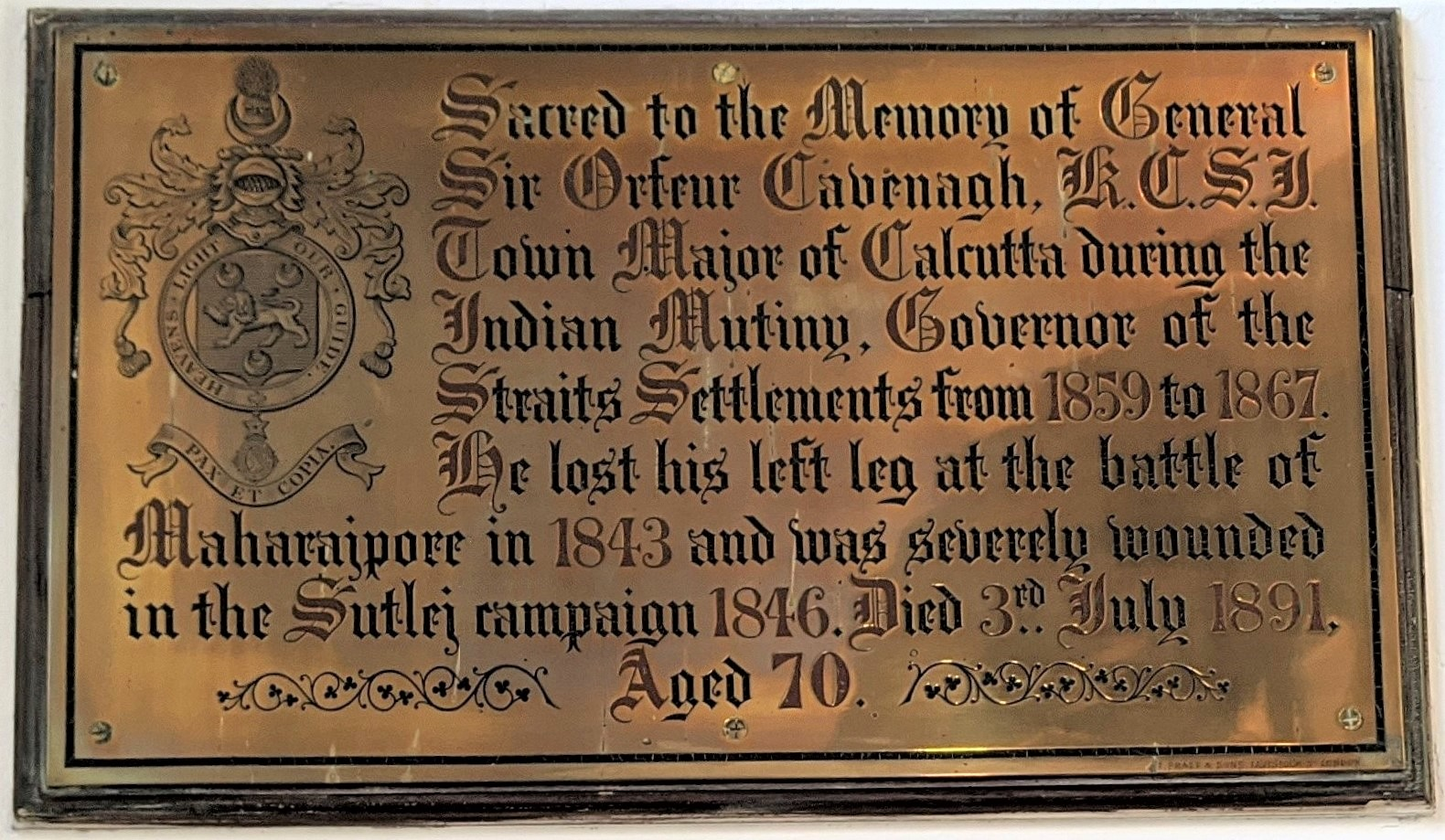
Memorial plaque to Cavenagh in St Mary's Church, Long Ditton, Surrey

General Sir Orfeur Cavenagh KCSI (8 October 1820 – 3 July 1891) was the last Governor of the Straits Settlements to be appointed by the East India Company, governing from 1859 to 1867 under the India Office.

== Family background ==
Cavenagh was the third son of James Gordon Cavenagh and Ann née Coates.

== Career ==
Cavenagh trained at Addiscombe Military Seminary, the military academy of the British East India Company. He passed his examination in June 1837, and in early 1838 joined the 32nd Regiment Native Infantry. In 1840, he passed the prescribed examination at Fort William College, Calcutta. He was appointed interpreter and quartermaster to the 41st Regiment Native Infantry. In 1840 and 1841, he was attached to the force employed in watching the Nepalese frontier.

He was adjutant of the 4th Irregular Cavalry (Skinner's Horse), and in December 1843 was badly wounded in the Battle of Maharajpore. His leg was severed just above the ankle by a round shot and his horse was killed under him. He was wounded again in January 1846 during the First Anglo-Sikh War, when he was struck in the left arm by a ricochetting round shot. After this he was appointed as Superintendent of the Mysore Princes and of the ex-Ameers of Sindh.

In 1850, he travelled to Britain and France in political charge of the Nepalese Embassy under Jung Bahadur Rana. In 1854, he was appointed Town and Fort Major of Calcutta. In this role he was responsible to the governor-general, the Marquess of Dalhousie followed by Lord Canning, for the safety of Fort William during the Indian Rebellion.

Lord Canning offered him the post of Governor of the Straits Settlements on 1 July 1859, In recognition of his services during the rebellion. He servered ties with Fort Williams on the 19 July and departed 28 July for Singapore on the steamer Lancefield arriving on 7 August where he took up the post on 8 August 1859 relieving his predecessor Edmund Augustus Blundell. Under a royal charter of 1826, Singapore, Malacca, Penang and Dindings had been combined to form the Straits Settlements. The Governor of the Settlements and his council were answerable to the Governor-General of India in Calcutta. The Governor had little formal power, but was able to influence the Calcutta authorities who relied largely on the recommendations of these representatives on legislation and policy in each settlement. Control passed from Bengal to the Colonial Office in London on 1 April 1867 and the Settlements became a Crown colony. Cavenagh was the last Governor who reported to the Governor-General in Calcutta. His successor, Sir Harry Ord, reported to the Colonial Office in London.

On 5 December 1866, he received unofficial word that he was to be removed from office on 1 April 1867 and resigned the commission himself on 15 March 1867. Cavenagh continued as a general officer in the Bengal Staff Corps, with promotion to lieutenant general in September 1874 and to general in August 1877.

== Personal life ==
Cavenagh married Elizabeth Marshall Moriarty on 7 September 1842 at Dinapore, India. They had two sons.

In retirement he lived in Long Ditton, Surrey, and in June 1884, he was made honorary colonel of the 5th Surrey Volunteer Corps. He died on 3 July 1891, aged 70, and was buried in the St Mary's churchyard in Long Ditton. There is also a memorial plaque inside the church.

== Honours ==
Cavenagh was appointed Knight Commander of the Most Exalted Order of the Star of India (KCSI) in the 1881 Birthday Honours on 24 May 1881.

== Legacy ==
Singapore's Cavenagh Road and Cavenagh Bridge is named in honour of the governor. The coat of arms of the Cavenagh family can still be seen atop the signage at both ends of the bridge.

== Bibliography ==
- Cavenagh, Orfeur (1884). Reminiscences of an Indian Official. W.H. Allen.
- Cavenagh-Mainwaring, J. G. The Mainwarings of Whitmore and Biddulph in the County of Stafford. pp. 180–181.
- Vibart, H.M. (1894). Addiscombe: its heroes and men of note. Westminster: Archibald Constable. pp. 473–4. OL 23336661M.

Government offices
Preceded by Edmund Augustus Blundell	Governor of Straits Settlements; 1859–1867	Succeeded by Major-General Sir Harry St. George Ord
