= Parliament House, Singapore =

Parliament House
- Dewan Parlimen (Malay) 国会大厦 (Chinese) நாடாளுமன்ற மாளிகை (Tamil)
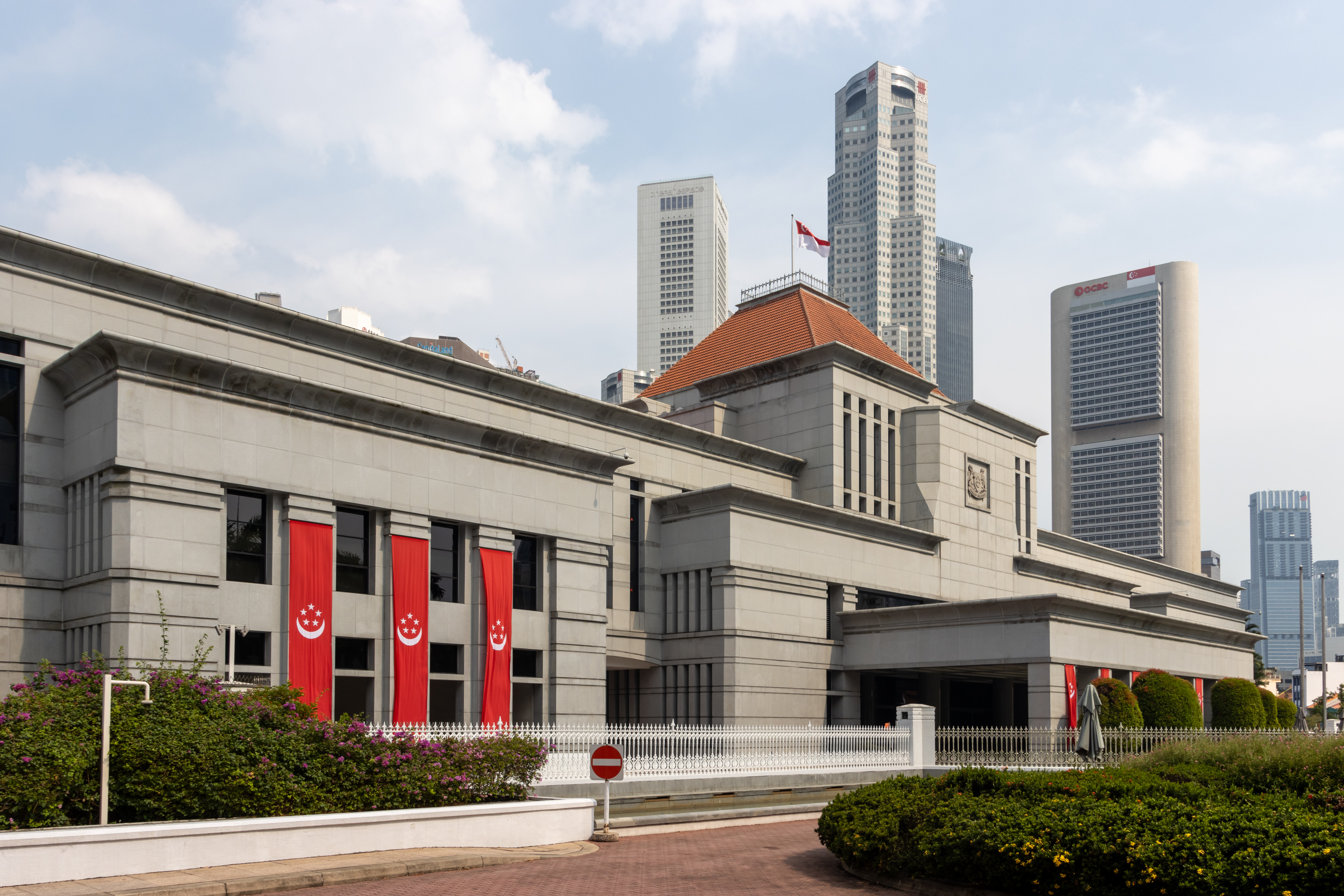
- The northern front of the Parliament House
- Interactive map of the Parliament House area

General information
- Type: Government building
- Location: 1 Parliament Place, Singapore 178880
- Coordinates: 1.2891°N 103.8504°E
- Construction started: 1995; 31 years ago
- Completed: July 1999; 26 years ago
- Cost: S$115.2 million
- Client: Government of Singapore

Design and construction
- Architects: Urban Redevelopment Authority; Public Works Department of Singapore
- Structural engineer: Urban Redevelopment Authority; Public Works Department of Singapore

Website
- Official website

Parliament House

Chinese name
- Chinese: 国会大厦
Transcriptions
Standard Mandarin
- Hanyu Pinyin: Guóhuì dàshà

Malay name
- Malay: Dewan Parlimen

Tamil name
- Tamil: நாடாளுமன்ற மாளிகை

The Parliament House is the seat and meeting place of the Parliament of Singapore, located within the Civic District of the Downtown Core in Singapore's Central Area. Situated along North Bridge Road near the banks of the Singapore River, the building lies opposite Raffles Place and faces the Supreme Court across the road. It is situated near other prominent landmarks within Singapore's administrative and civic centre, including the historical City Hall which has since been converted into the National Gallery Singapore.

Designed to conceive a modern expression of sovereignty and authority, it combines contemporary and classical influences. It features a prism-shaped roof designed by President Ong Teng Cheong, who was also an architect by profession, as a reinterpretation of the traditional dome. The project was carried out by the Public Works Department, now known as CPG Corporation, with private architectural firms and was completed in 1999.

It replaced the Old Parliament House, a neoclassical building that had served as the legislative chamber since the 1950s and especially after self-government was achieved in 1959. The older structure, which dates back to the 1820s, was later restored and repurposed as The Arts House, a multidisciplinary arts and heritage venue.

== Planning and construction ==
The space constraints faced by the Old Parliament House were felt since the early 1980s, when the members of parliament grew from 51 in 1963 to 75 in 1983, a point made by then Leader of the House, Edmund William Barker during a parliamentary debate on 16 March 1983. The old building had been renovated several times to accommodate the demand for space, but there was a limit as to how much the building could be widened without disrupting the Chamber's configuration and causing discomfort to its members. The debate concluded in 1989, when the First Deputy Prime Minister Goh Chok Tong proposed the idea to build a new parliament house.

The project started in earnest in May 1989, when a project team was formed to design and build the new house. Headed by Liu Thai Ker, CEO and Chief Planner of the Urban Redevelopment Authority (URA), it comprised architects and engineers from the URA and the Public Works Department (PWD). Various designs were put forth by PWD architects for the new site next to the existing parliament house, led by PWD Director Chua Hua Meng and Deputy Director Lee Kut Cheung.

In 1992, the project was approved by the government with a budget of S$148.2 million. The following year, the Committee on the Parliament Complex Development Project was established, headed by the Speaker of Parliament Tan Soo Khoon, and with Wong Kan Seng, Lee Boon Yang, and Lim Hng Kiang as its members. Tasked to liaise with architects in the planning and construction of the building, the committee members also went on two overseas study missions to gather ideas to be incorporated into the building's design. The first trip was made to Australia, where visits were made to the newly built Parliament House in Canberra. Here, extensive attention was paid to public education of the parliamentary system in the form of galleries, moot parliaments. A second visit was made to Europe, to incorporate contrasting older, traditional ideas into the building's design.

With these ideas incorporated, the new building's concept plan was approved by the Cabinet in 1994. Construction began in 1995 on the expunged Hallpike Street under the direction of PWD Director Chua Hua Meng and Deputy Director Tan Chee Wee, and was completed in July 1999 at a cost of S$115.2 million.

On 6 September 1999, the flag of Singapore was lowered for the last time at the old Parliament House, before the ceremonial "walk over" was conducted from the old building to the new. Led by the Speaker of Parliament and the Prime Minister, the entourage of MPs walked along Parliament Place, a renamed segment of High Street, Singapore, before reaching the new Parliament House where the flag was unfurled and hoisted with the national anthem being played. The entourage then filed into the new Chamber, where the parliamentary debate resumed. On 4 October 1999, the building was officially opened with a simple ceremony held at the building's foyer, where a stainless steel plaque was unveiled before 100 MPs and invited guests.

== Architecture ==
The new Parliament House was designed by the Public Works Department, and comprises three new blocks (Chamber Block, Front Block and Public Block) integrated with an existing restored building built in 1864 and which once housed the Attorney-General's Chambers. This block was gazetted as a national monument on 14 February 1992. The building was built not only as a venue for parliamentary debates, but also a research centre and meeting place for the members of parliament (MPs), as well as a place of interest for students and the general public.

Due to its setting in the richly historical area, the building's overall design harks back to its more historical neighbours with its slate grey external colour scheme and liberal use of accentuated columns reflective of the colonnade design common in classical architecture.

The main entrance from North Bridge Road is preceded by a grand ceremonial driveway flanked by palm trees, an iconic tree peculiar to the tropical region and complemented by fountain pools. The building's grand foyer is topped by the timber atrium, seen from the outside as the building's signature prism-shaped pinnacle.

With 100 seats and room for 20 more, the new Chamber features contemporary IT features like an electronic voting system, an integrated congress system, IT terminals and so on. Generous space is devoted to the Strangers' Gallery and the Press Gallery, allowing for more members of the public to observe proceedings. In addition, a new sound-proofed Educational Gallery was built on the top floor of the chamber allowing for staff and teachers to verbally explain live parliamentary proceedings to students, as well as a moot parliament, history corner, and multimedia information kiosks to provide a full educational programme, as is the case in the Parliament House in Canberra.

Also part of the new building are a 170-seat auditorium, a library, range of meeting and IT rooms and media facilities, a dining room, a 100-seat public cafeteria and even a gymnasium. Car parking is available below ground, leaving much valuable space above to include lush landscaping and a 2,770 square metre garden.

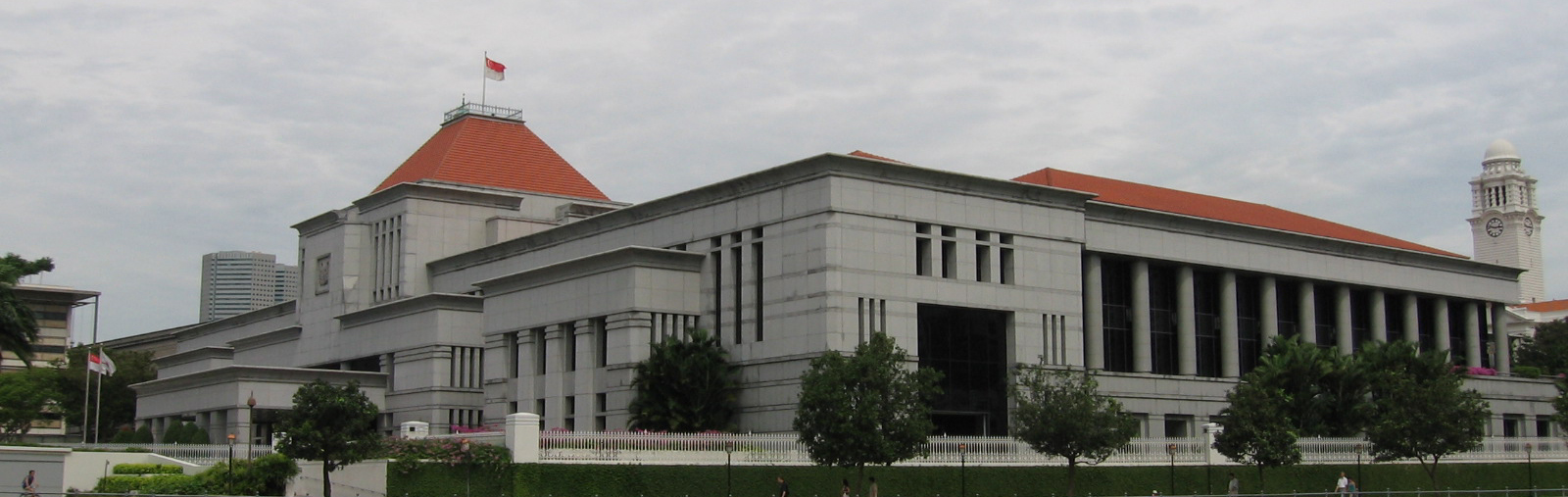
Parliament House, Singapore

== Gallery ==
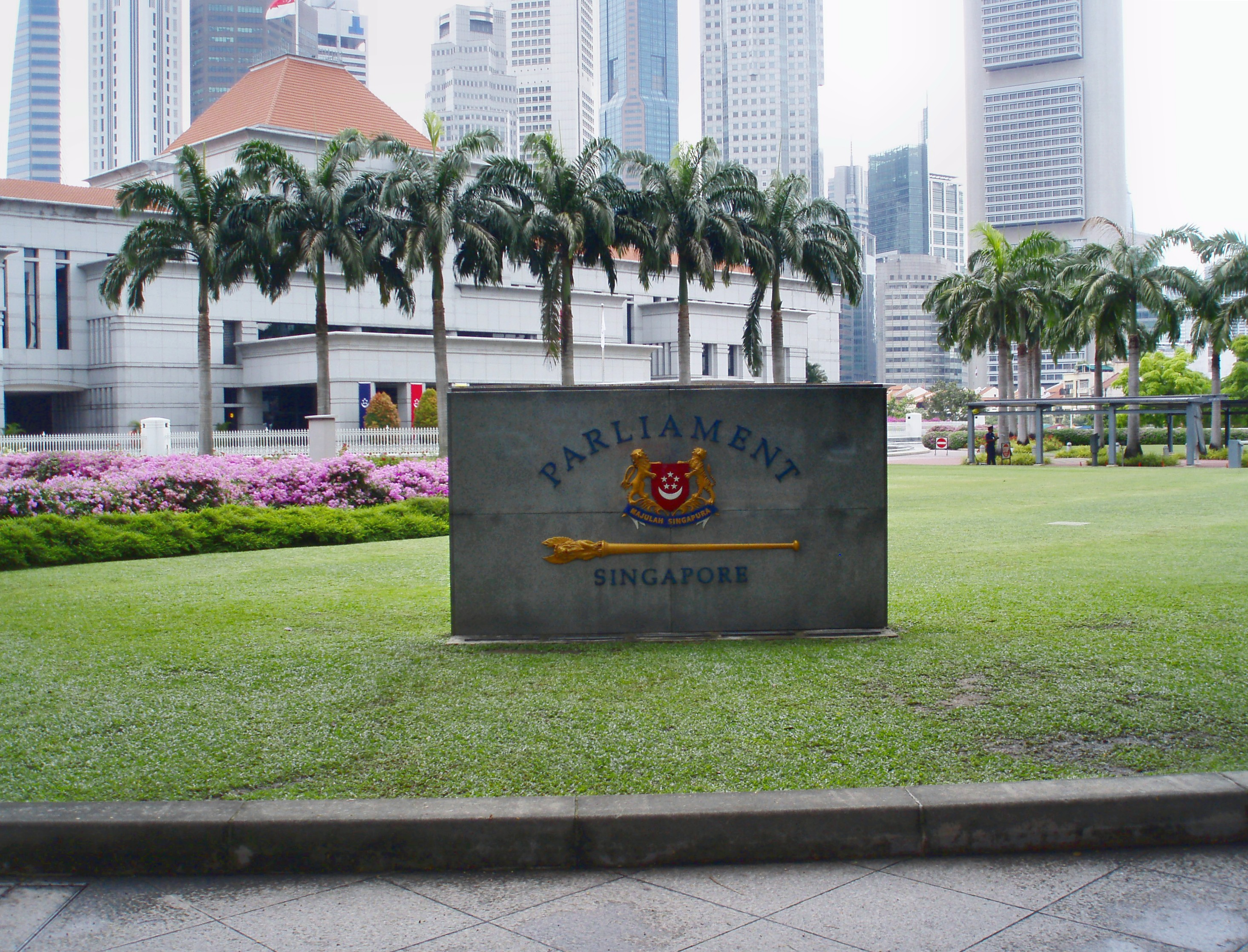

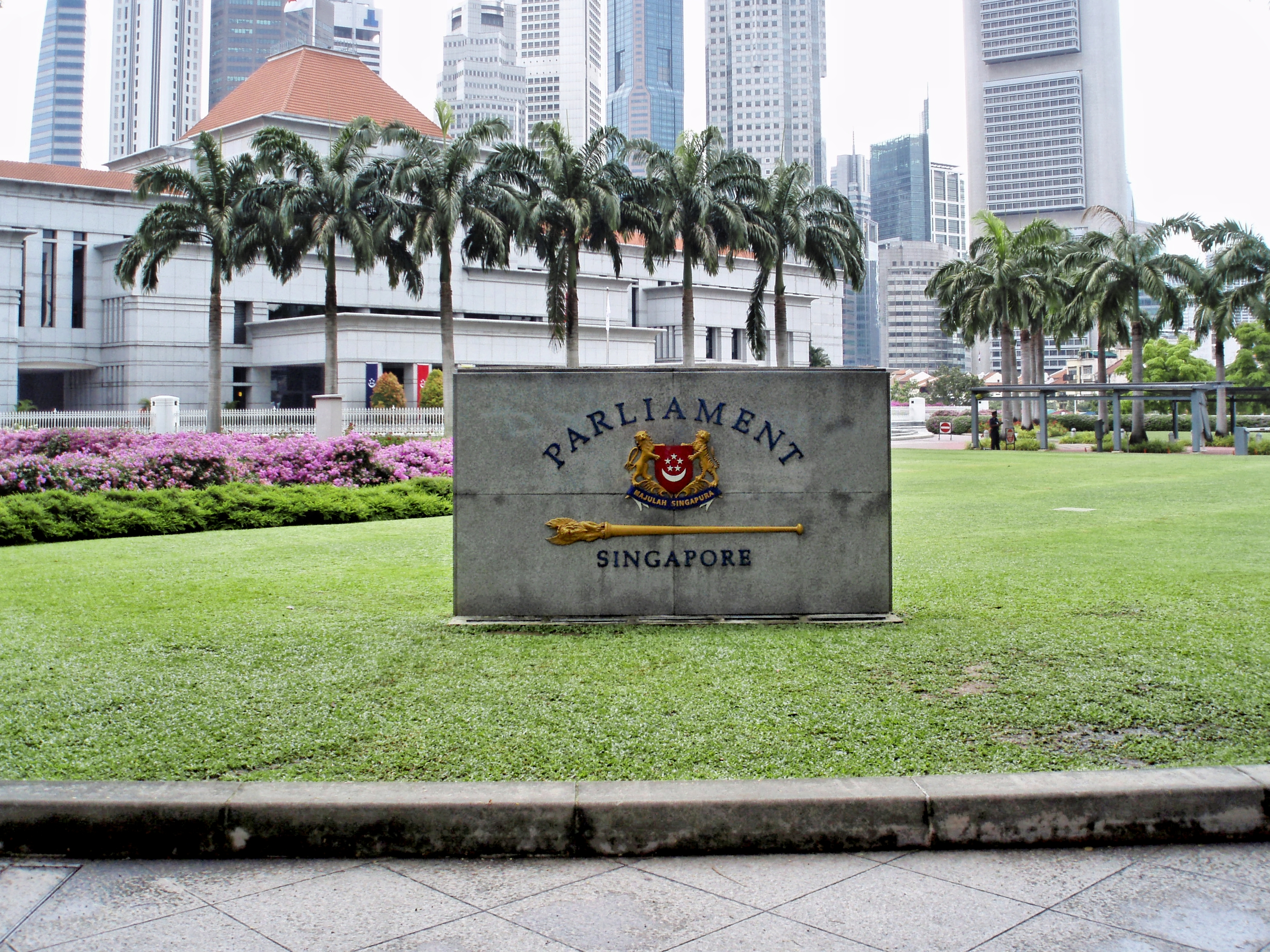

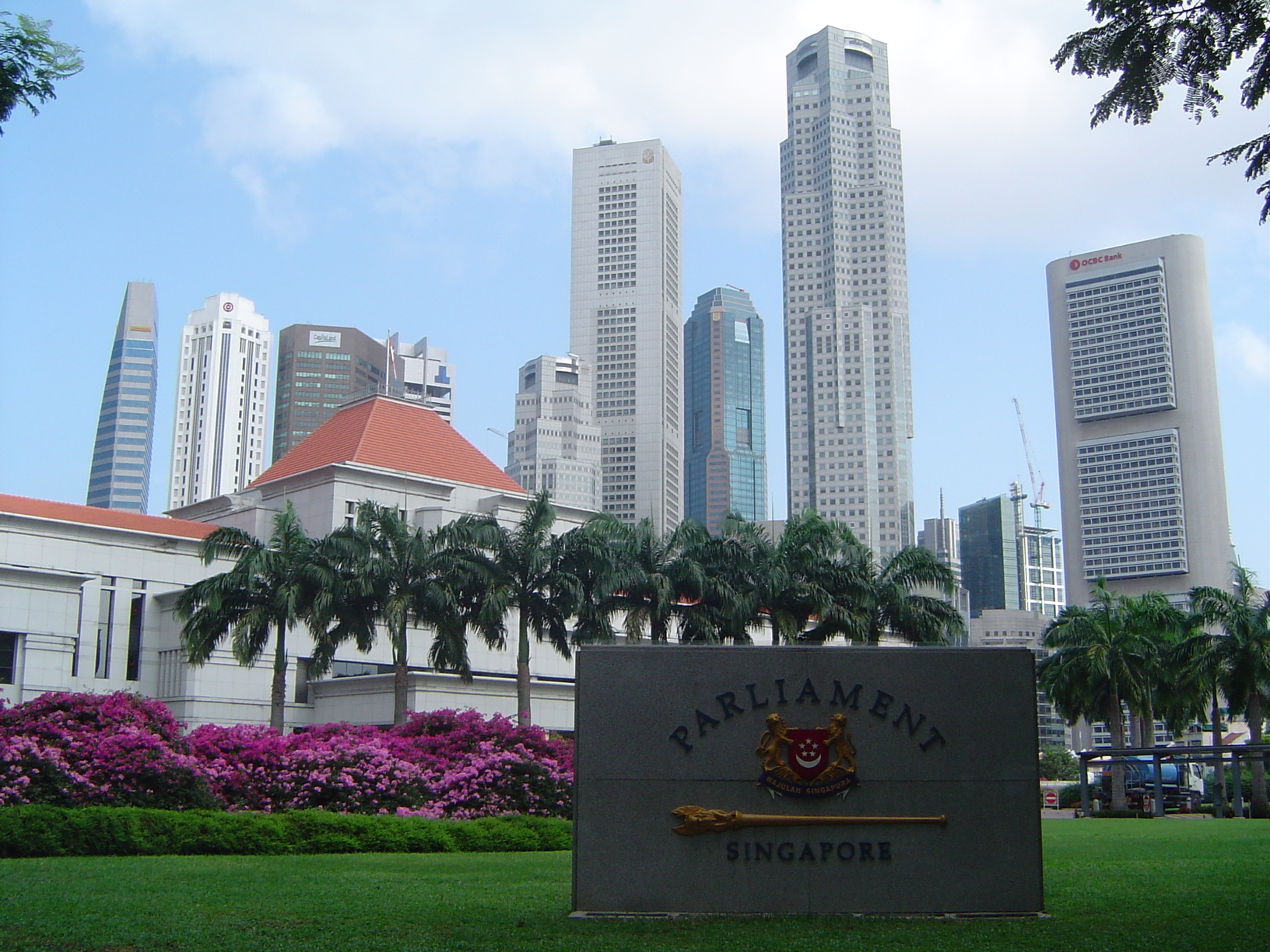

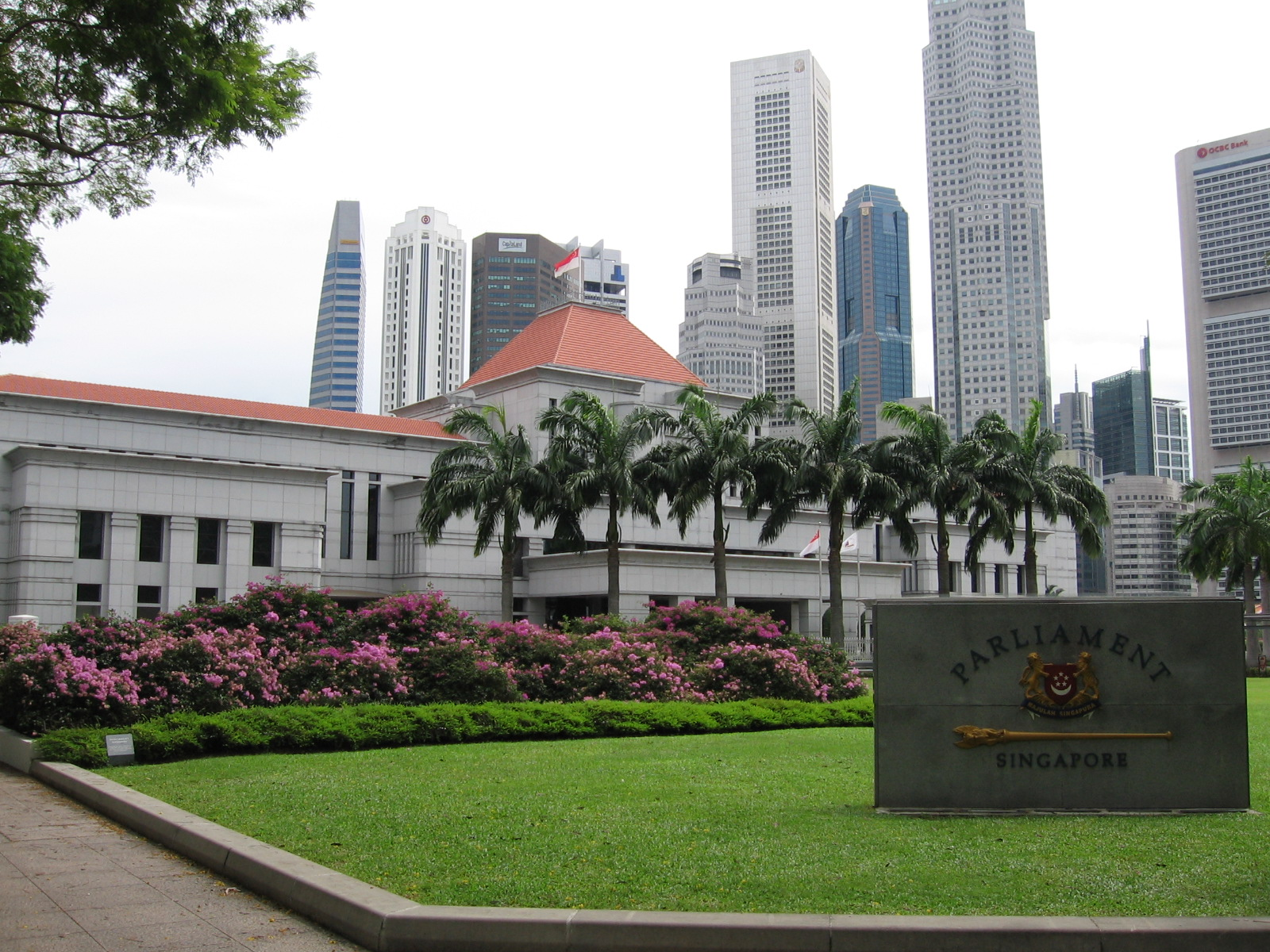

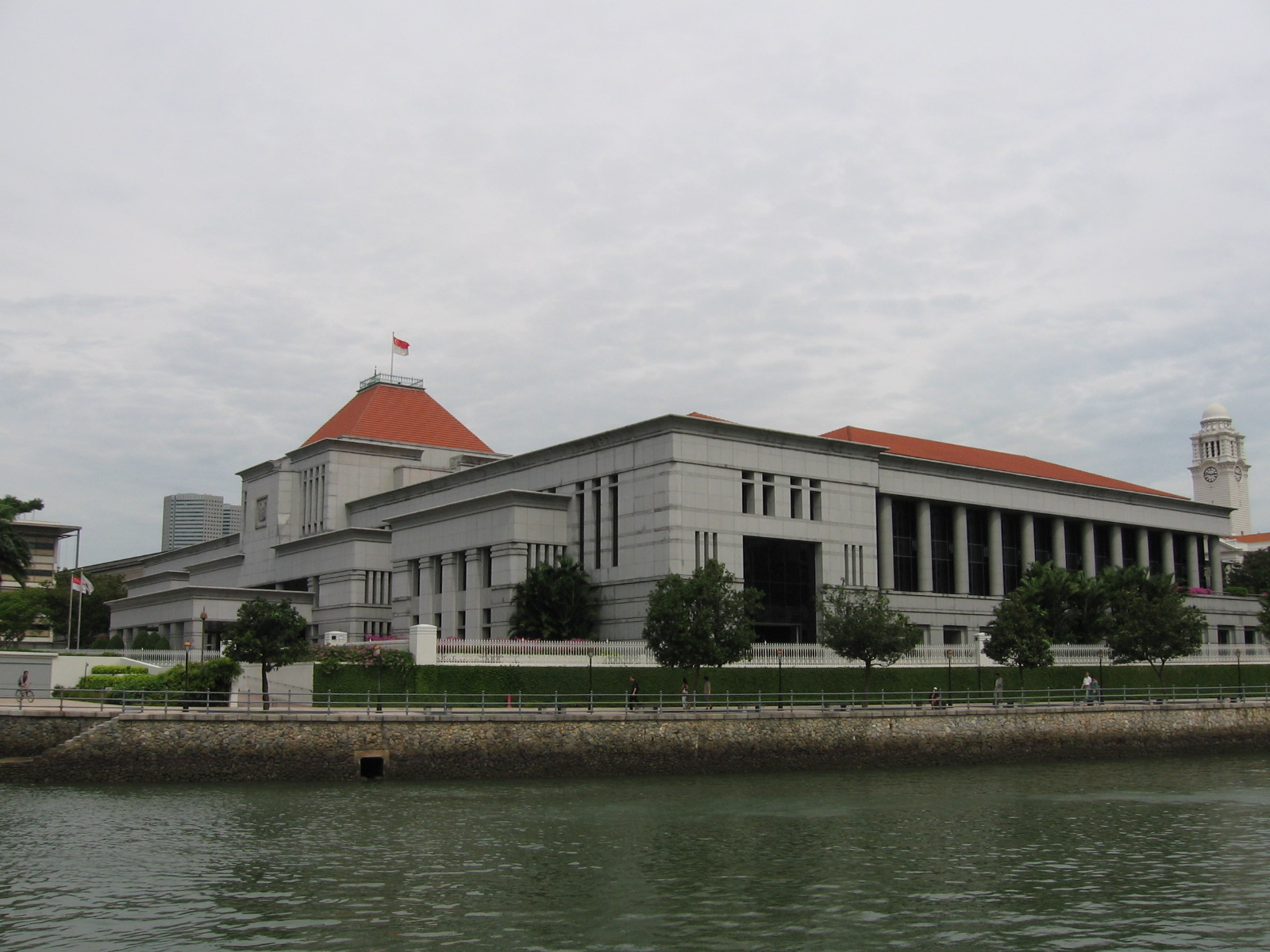

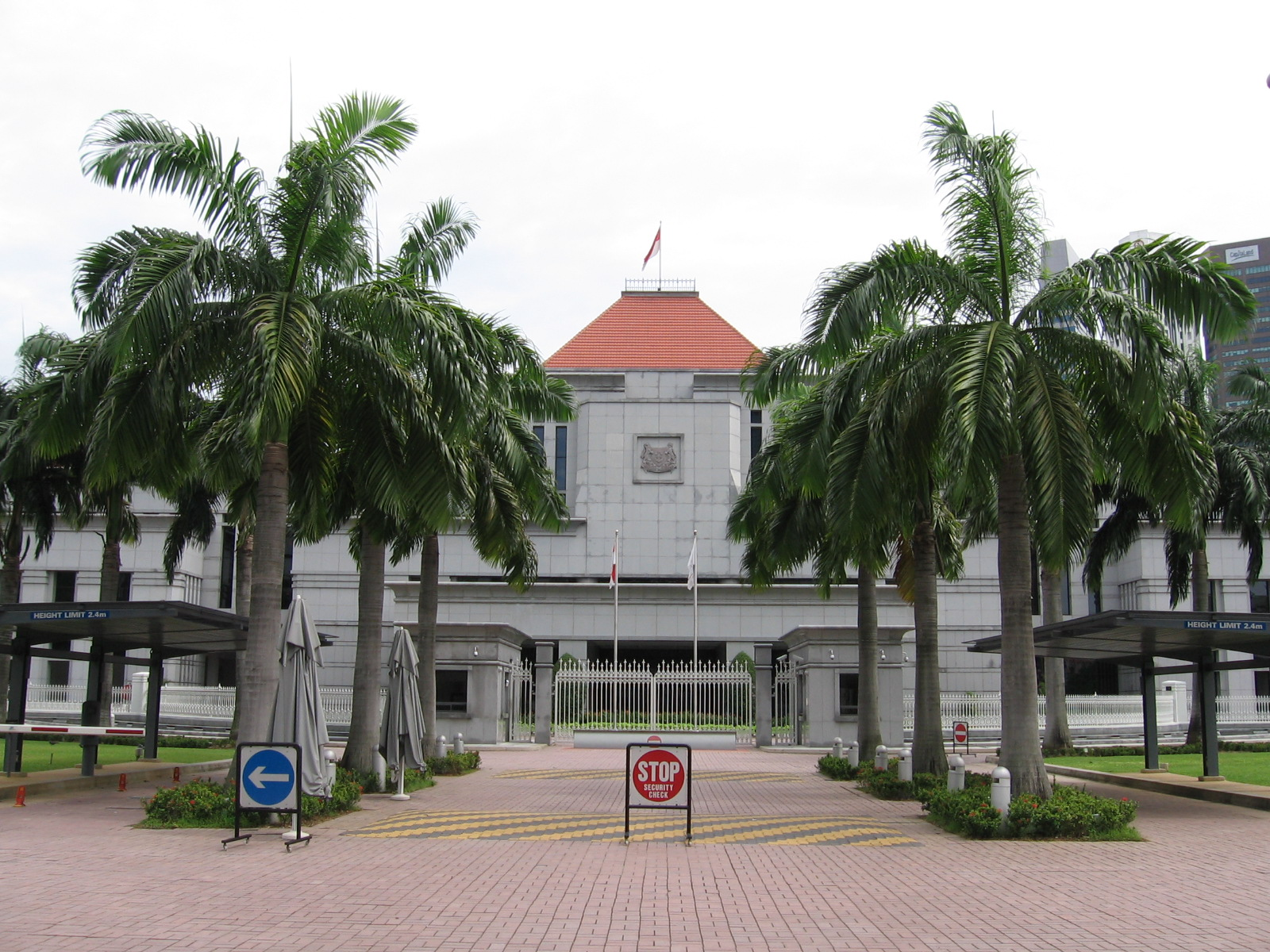

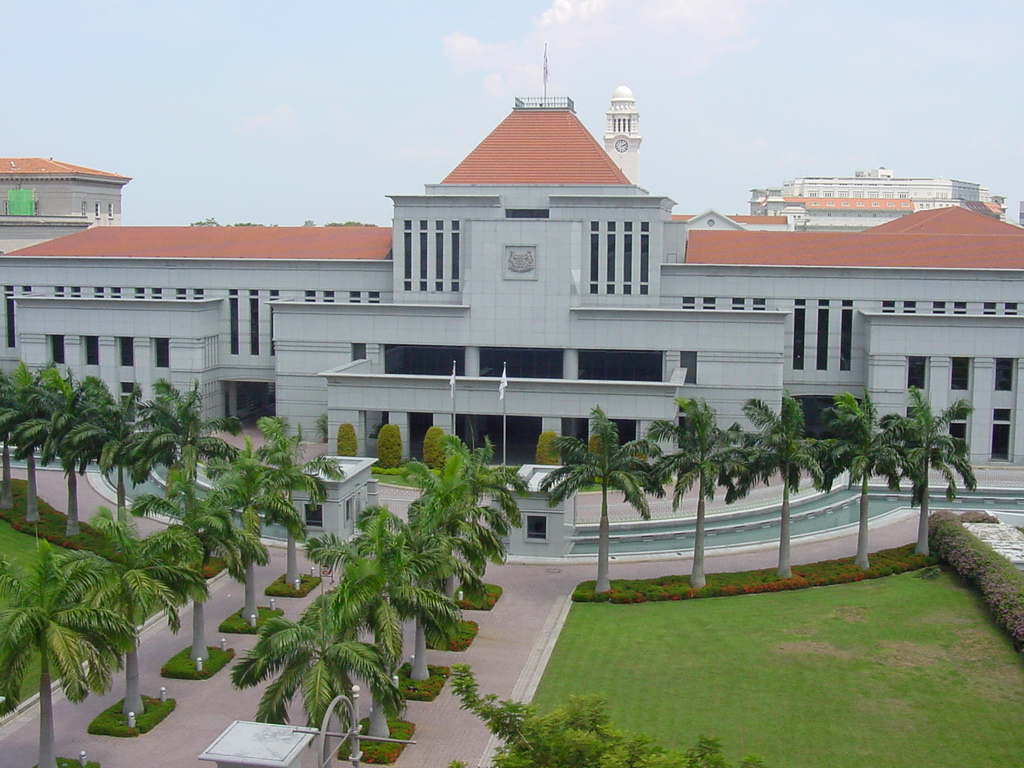

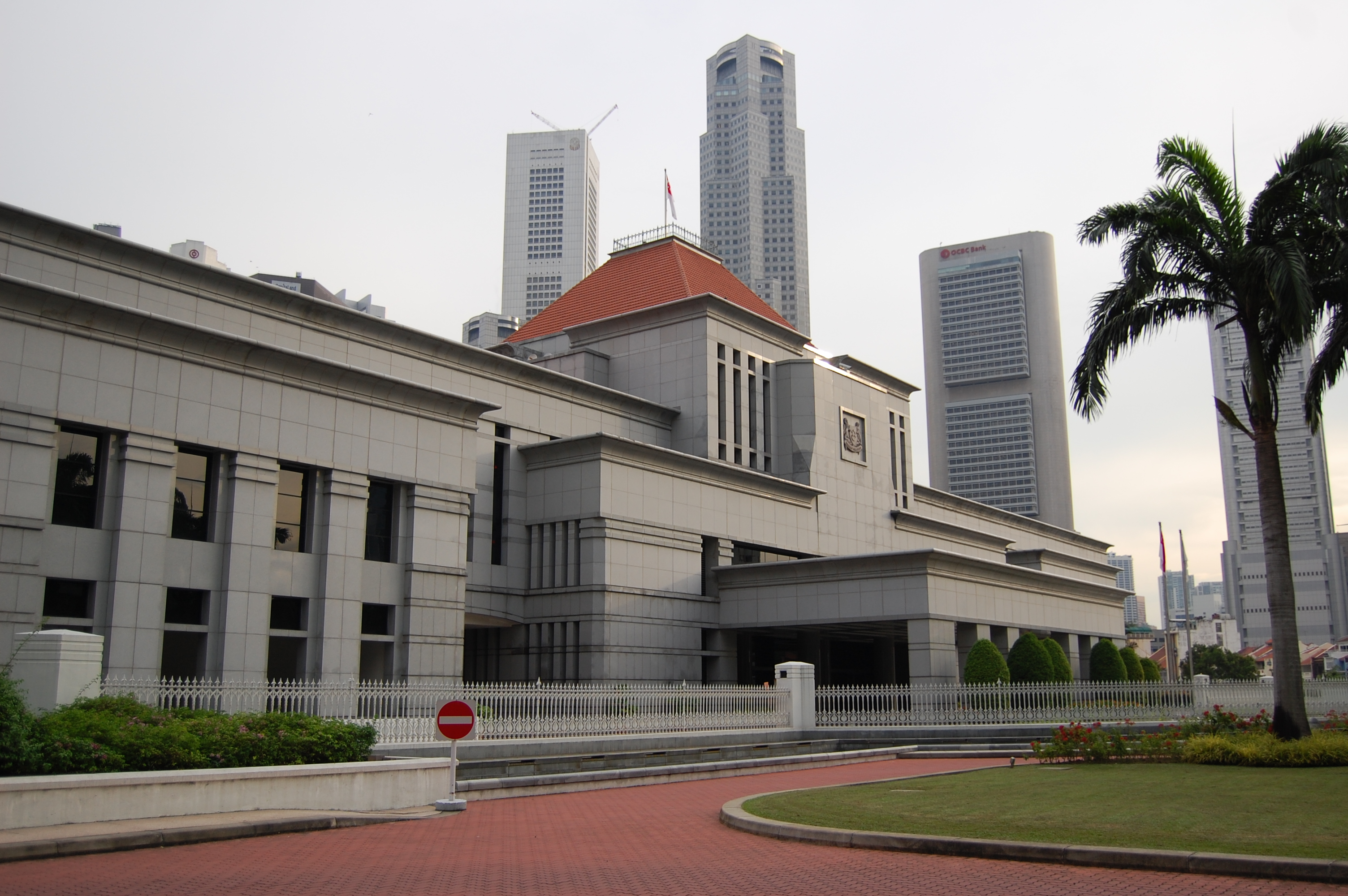

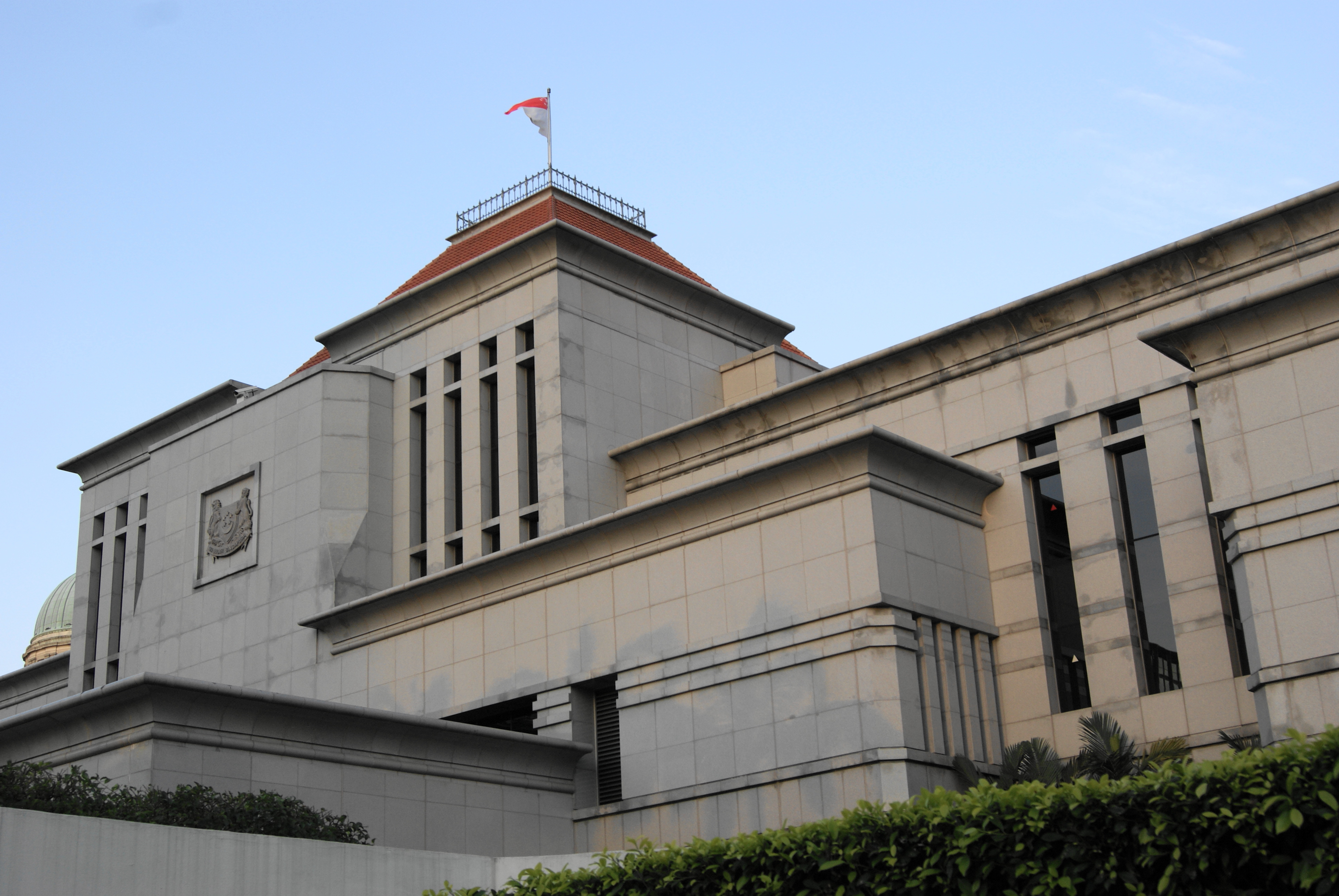

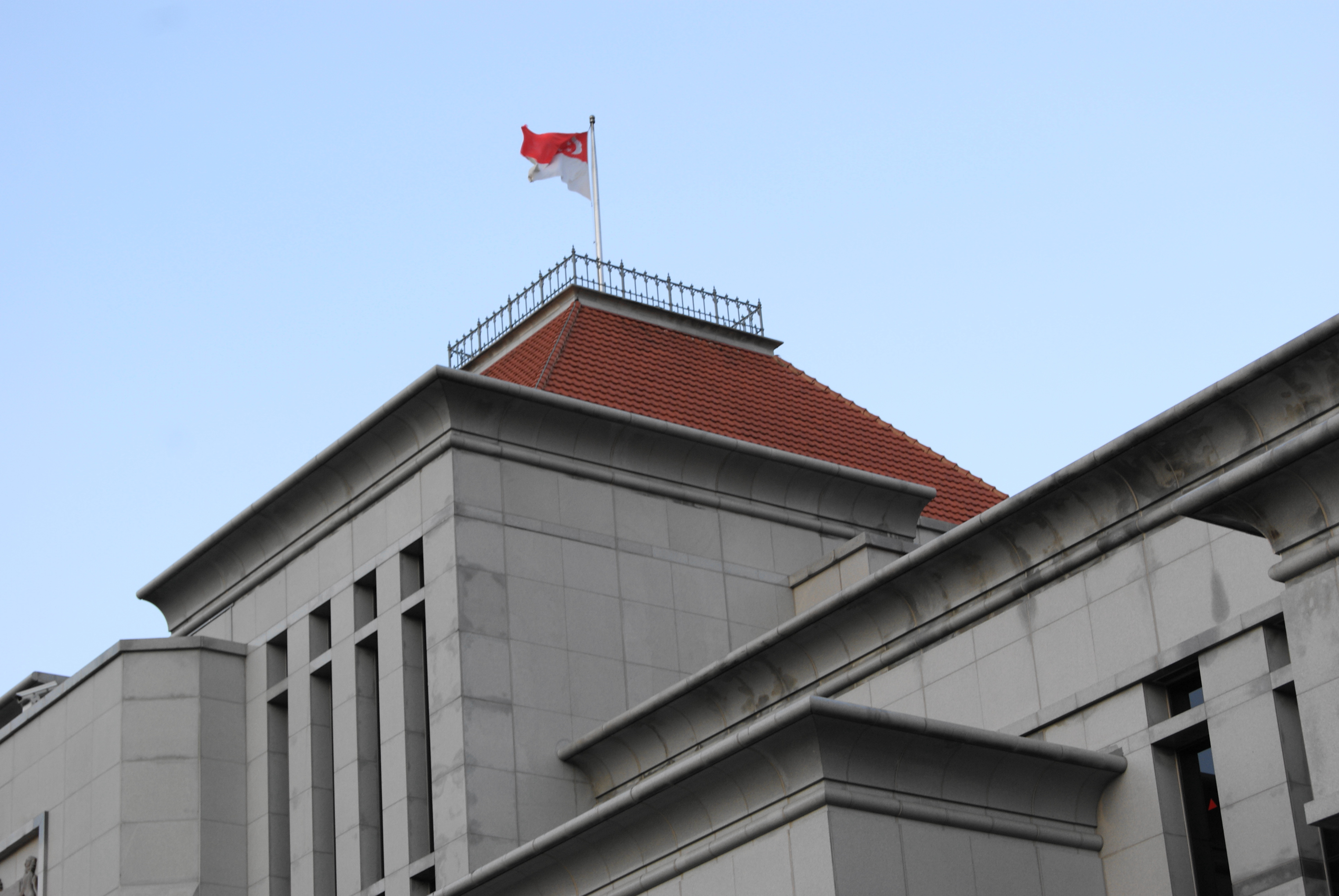

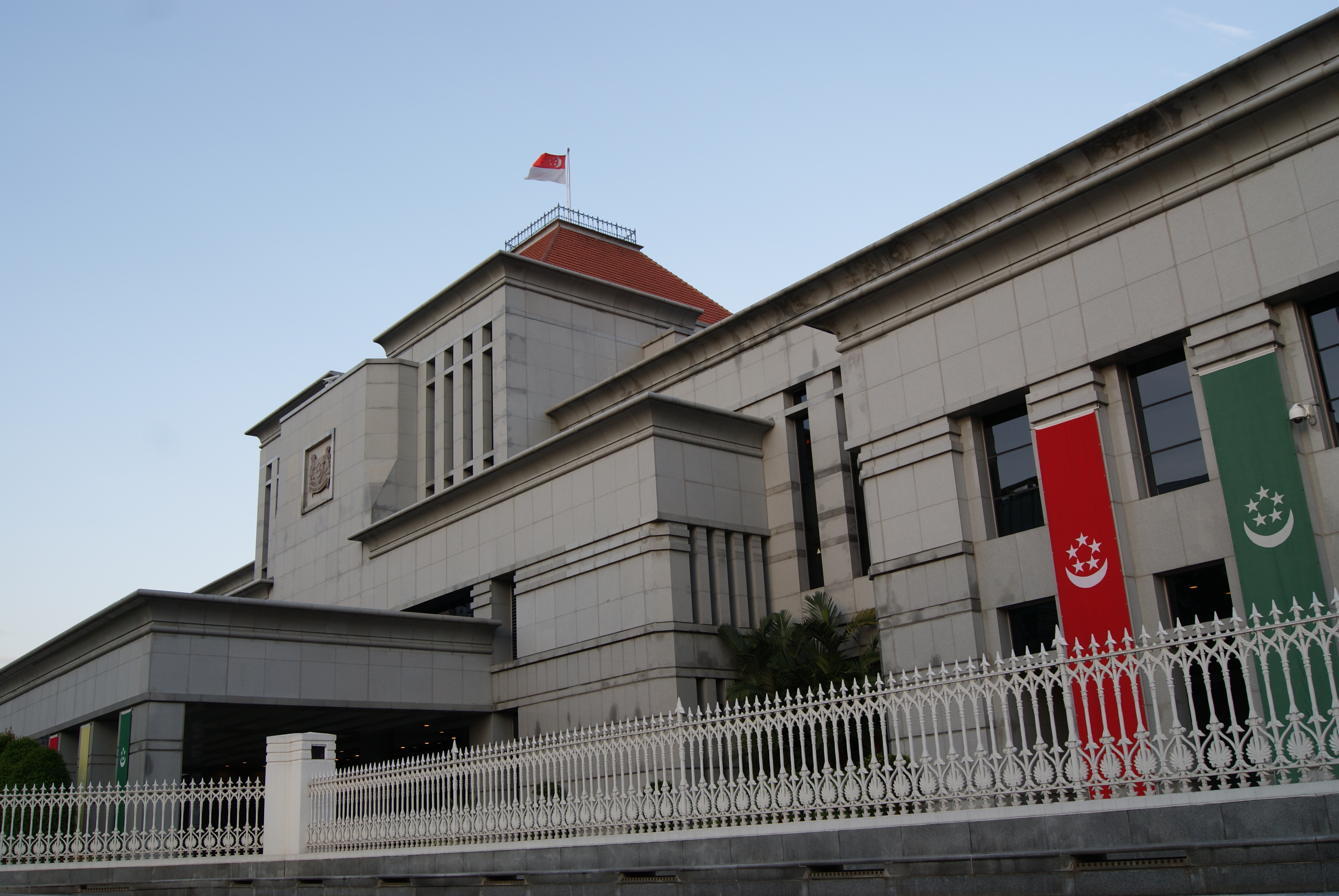

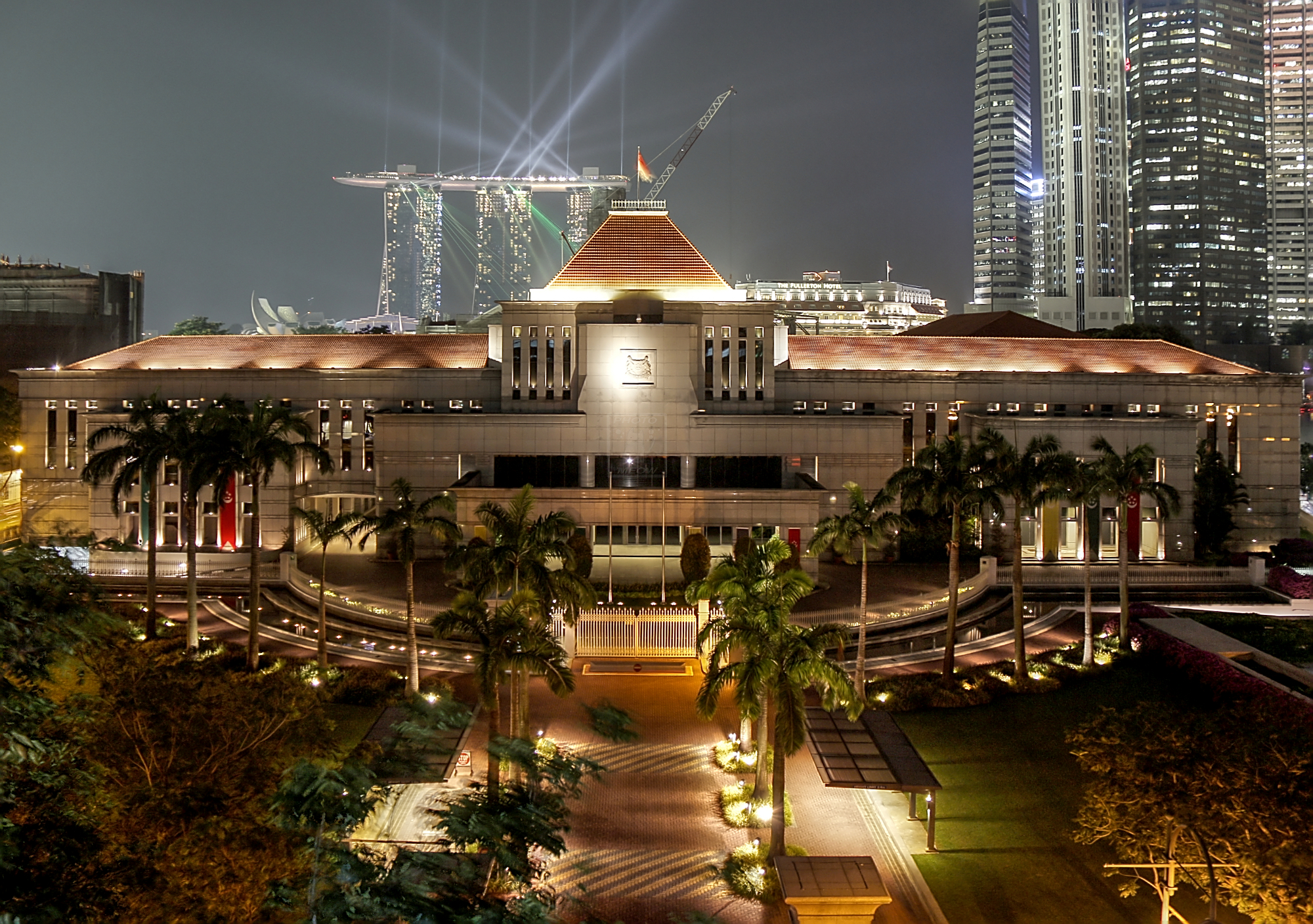

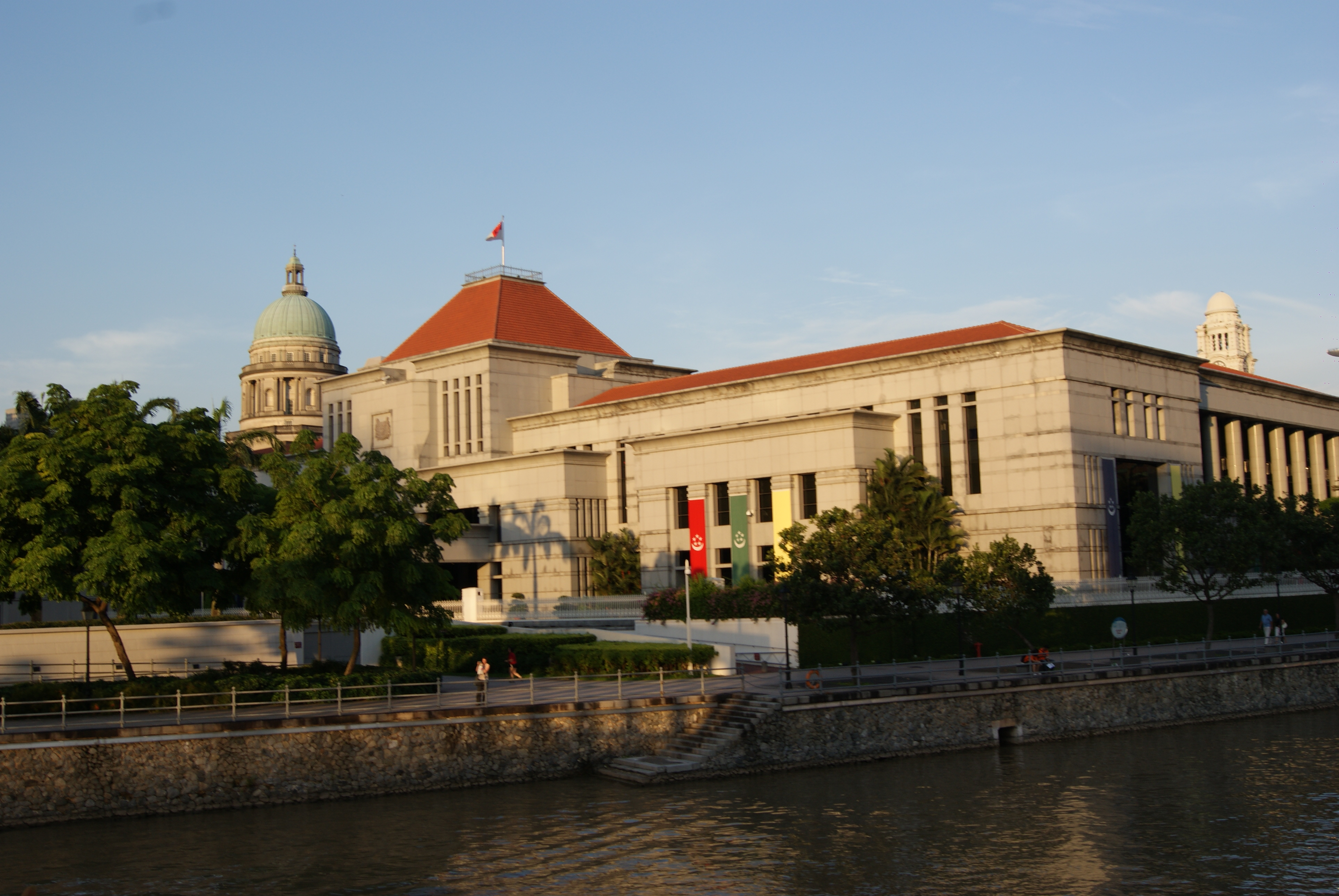

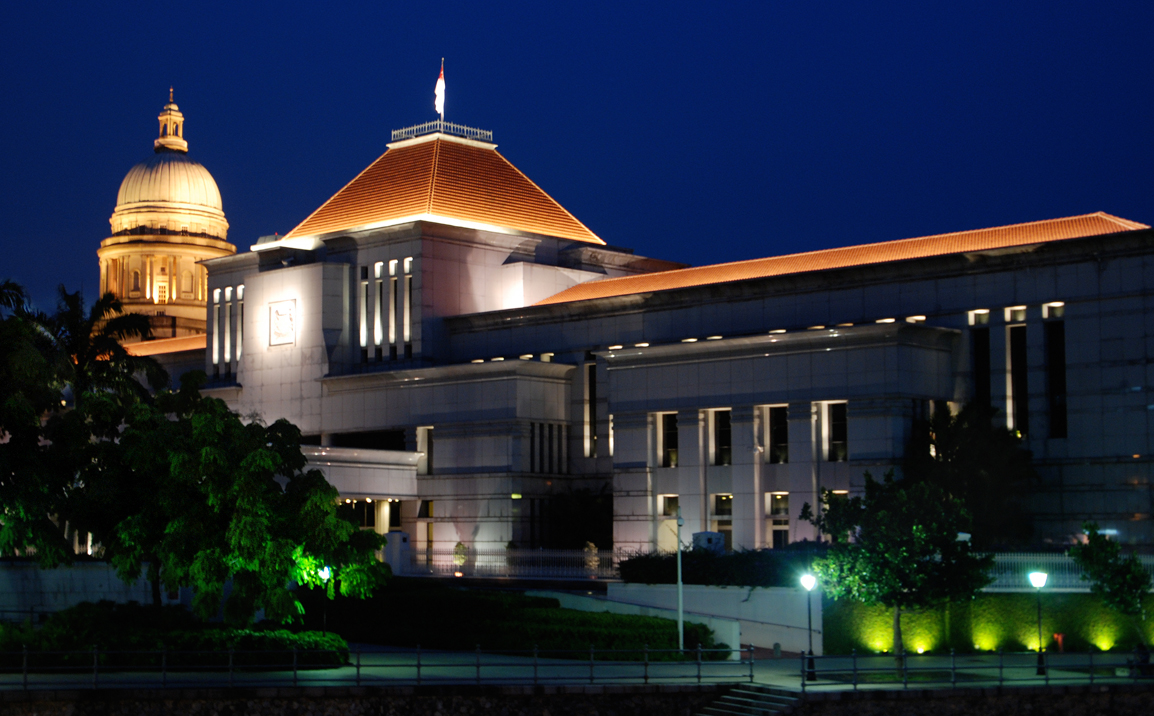

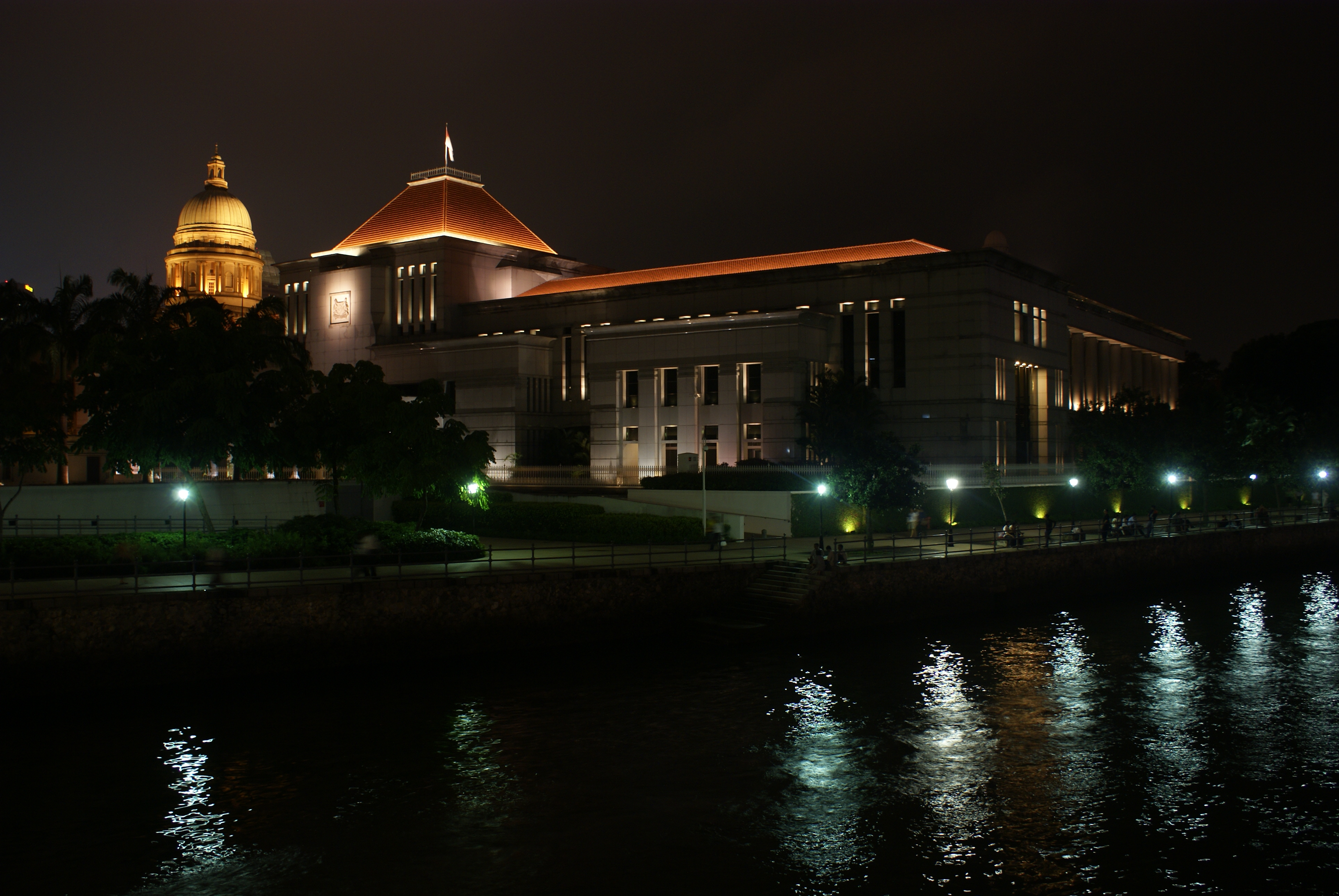

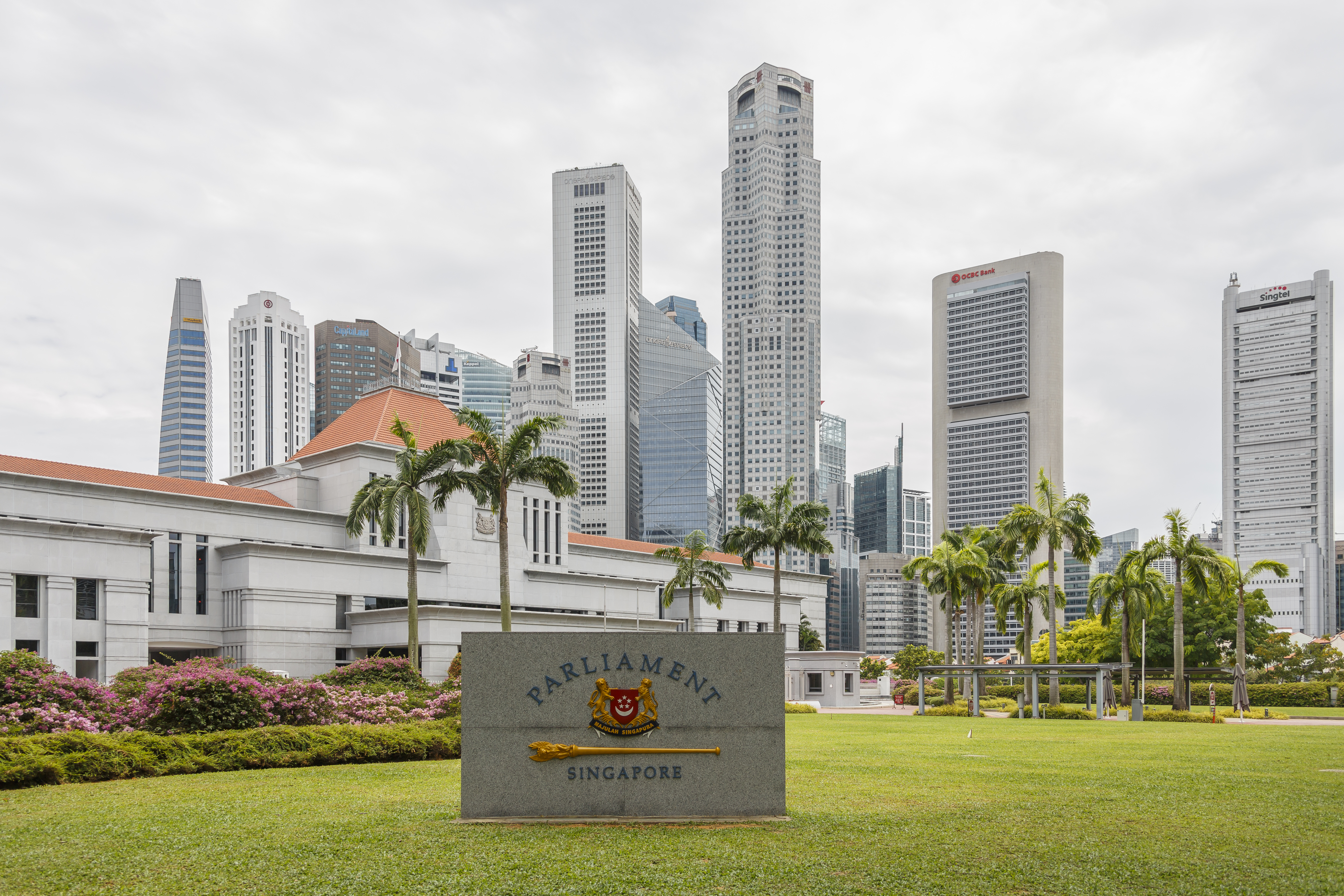

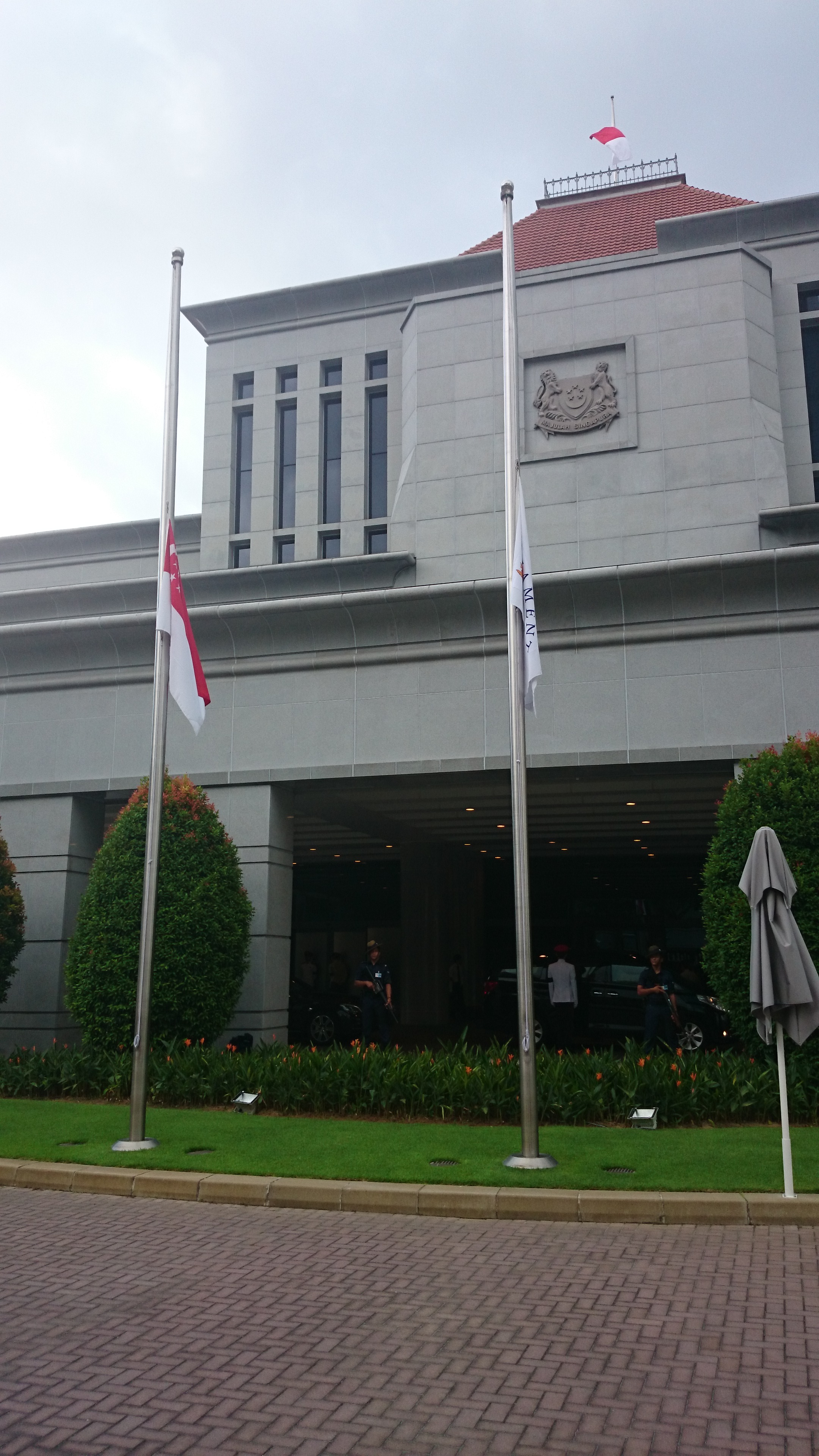

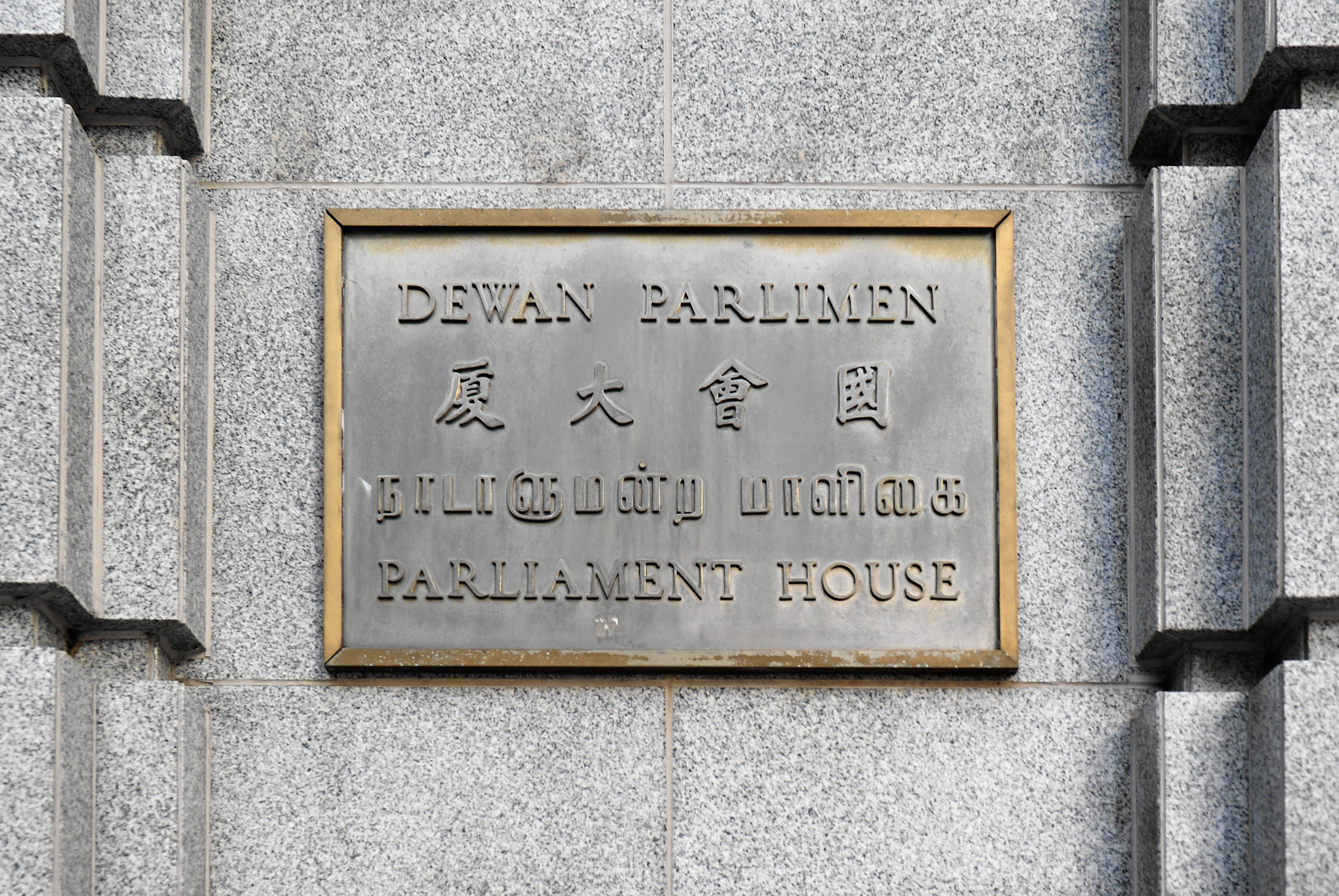

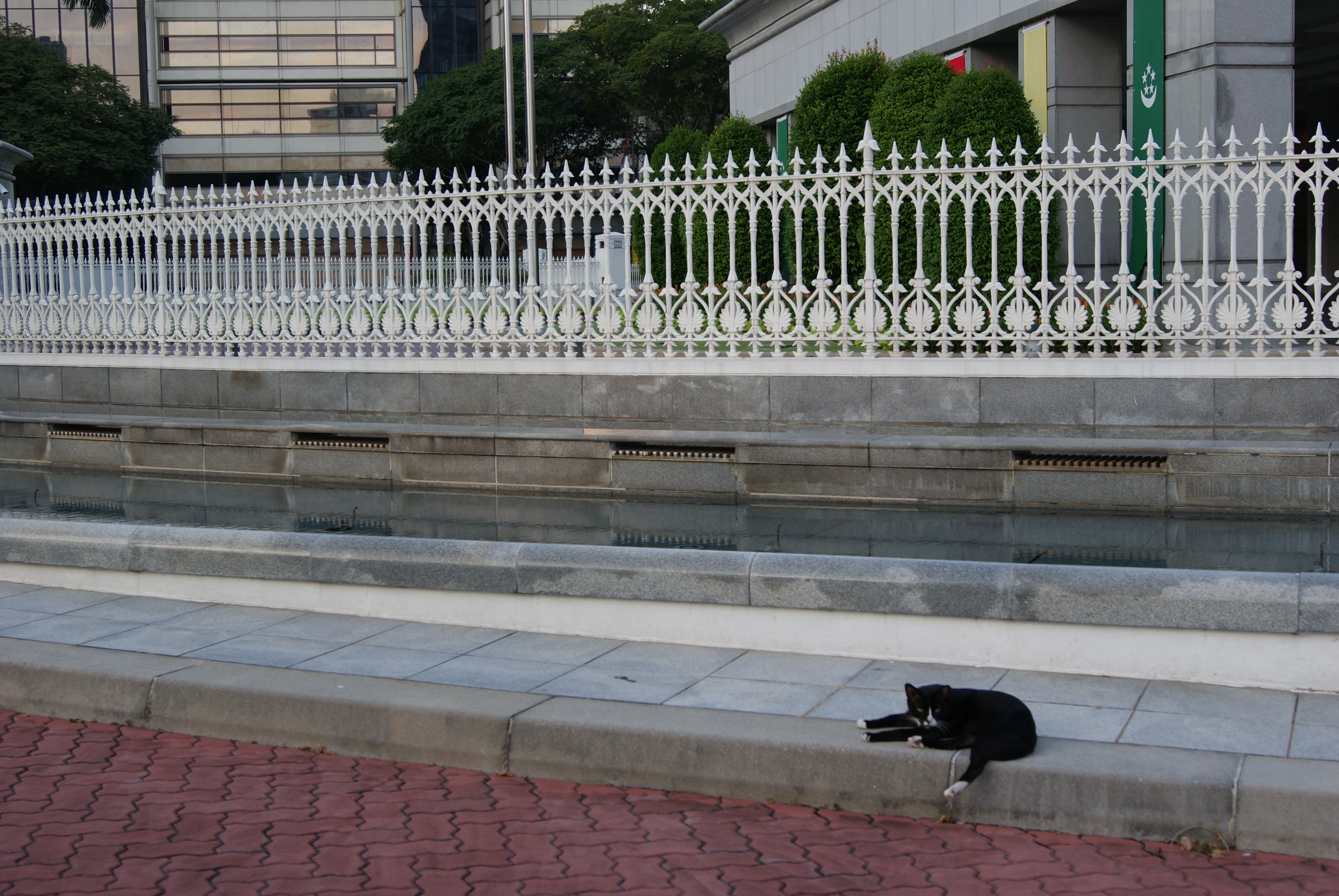

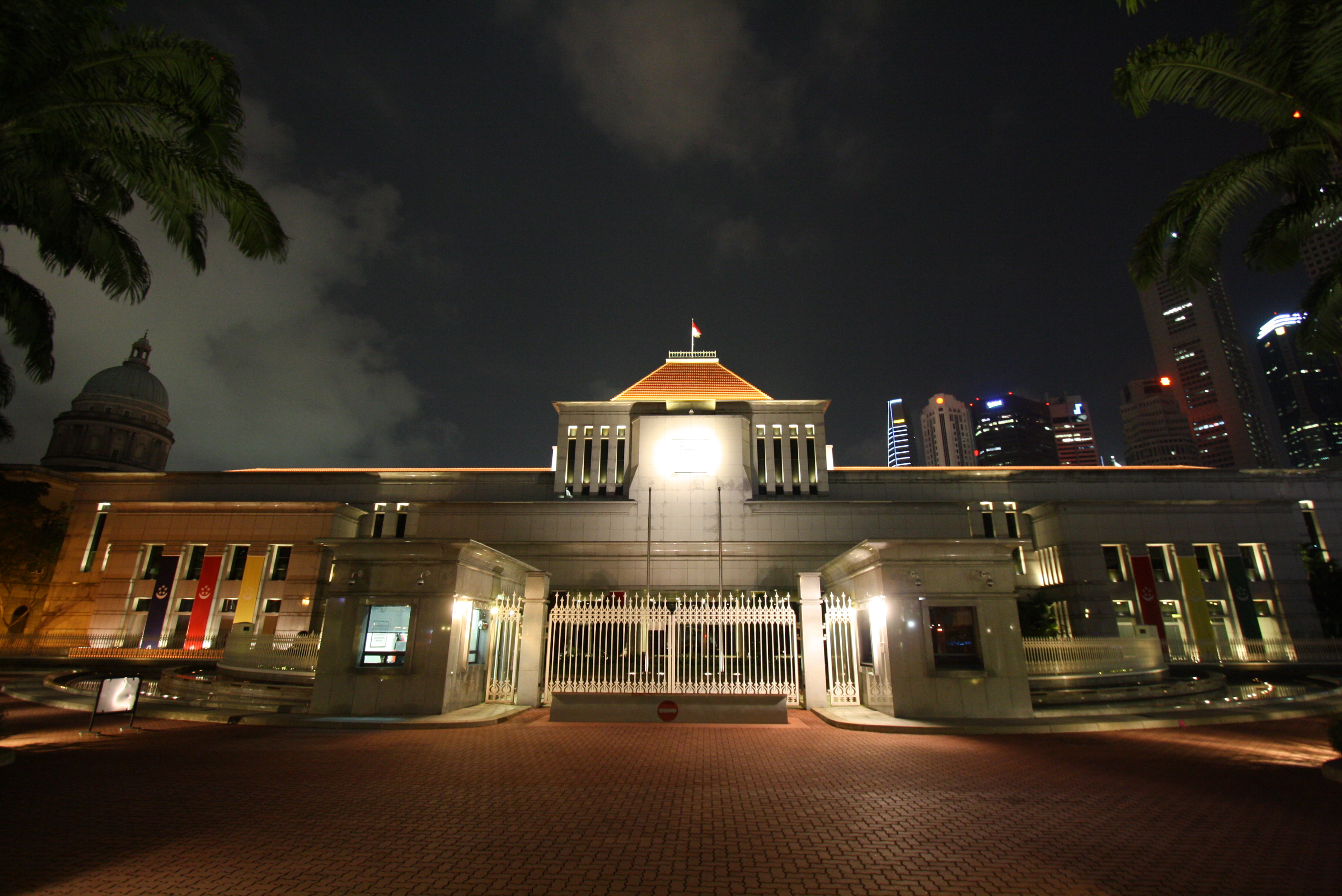
