= Bonham =

Bonham may refer to:

- Bonham (surname), an English and Welsh surname
- Bonham (band), a British hard rock band formed by Jason Bonham
- Bonham (Rouse), a percussion work by Christopher Rouse
- Bonham, Wiltshire, a place in the United Kingdom
- Bonham, Texas, a place in the United States

== See also ==
- Justice Bonham (disambiguation)
- Bonham Carter family, British surname
- Dr. Bonham's Case, a legal case decided in 1610 concerning the supremacy of the common law in England
- Bonhams, British auction house
