= Bonham Baronetcy =

Baronetcy in the Baronetage of the United Kingdom

Bonham baronets
- Escutcheon of the Bonham baronets of Malmesbury
- Creation date: 1852
- Status: extant
- Motto: Esse quam videri, To be, rather than to seem to be

The Bonham Baronetcy, of Malmesbury in the County of Wiltshire is a title in the Baronetage of the United Kingdom. It was created on 27 November 1852 for the colonial administrator George Bonham. He was Governor of Hong Kong from 1848 to 1854.

He was succeeded by his son, the second Baronet. He was a diplomat and served as Envoy Extraordinary and Minister Plenipotentiary to Serbia between 1900 and 1903 and to Switzerland between 1905 and 1909. His eldest surviving son, the third Baronet, was a Major in the Scots Greys and also held several offices within the Royal Household. His son, the fourth Baronet, who succeeded in 1937, was also a Major in the Scots Greys and served as a deputy lieutenant of Gloucestershire. He died in 2009 and was succeeded by his eldest son, who currently serves as Clerk to the Worshipful Company of Firefighters.

== Bonham, of Malmesbury, baronets (1852) ==
- Sir Samuel George Bonham, KCB, 1st Baronet (1803–1863)
- Sir George Francis Bonham, 2nd Baronet (1847–1927)
- Sir Eric Henry Bonham, CVO, 3rd Baronet (1875–1937)
- Sir Antony Lionel Thomas Bonham, 4th Baronet (1916–2009)
- Sir George Martin Anthony Bonham, 5th Baronet (born 1945)

The heir apparent to the baronetcy is Michael Francis Bonham (born 1980), only son of the 5th Baronet.
