= George Francis Bonham =

British diplomat

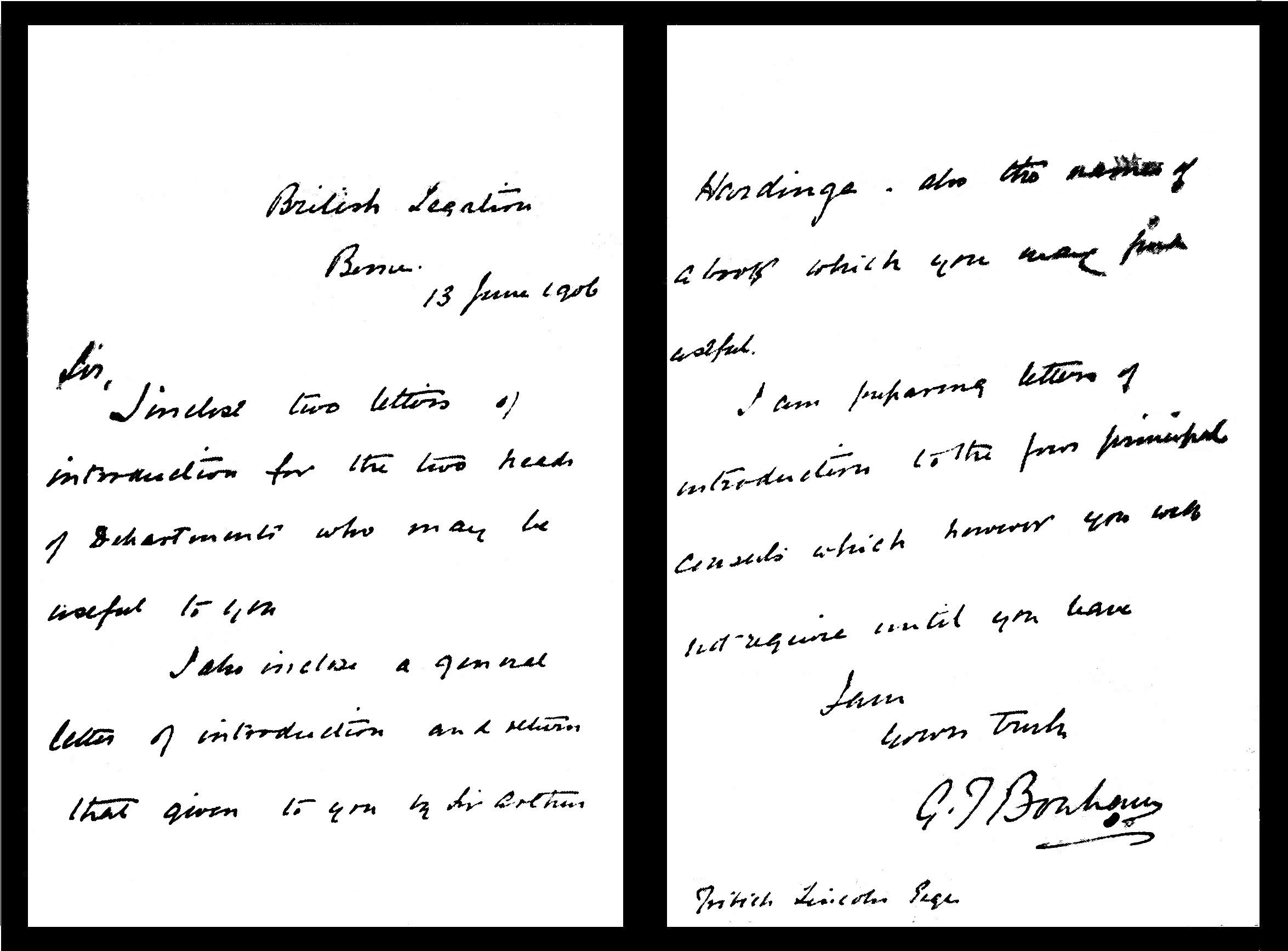
A letter from Sir George Bonham to Ignaz Trebitsch-Lincoln, 1906

Sir George Bonham, 2nd Baronet (28 August 1847 – 31 July 1927), was a British diplomat, ambassador to Serbia and Switzerland.

== Career ==
George Francis Bonham was educated at Eton College and Exeter College, Oxford. He succeeded to the baronetcy at the age of 16 on the death of his father, the 1st baronet. He joined the Diplomatic Service in 1869 and served at the embassies in St Petersburg, Vienna, Rome, Lisbon, Madrid, Paris and The Hague. He was Secretary of the Embassy at Madrid 1893–1897 and at Rome 1897–1900. He was Minister to Serbia 1900–1903 and Minister to the Swiss Confederation 1905–1909.

== Family ==
Bonham was succeeded by his son, Eric Henry Bonham (1875–1937). His eldest daughter Edith Florence Bonham married in March 1903 Evelyn Mountstuart Grant Duff, son of Sir Mountsuart Grant Duff.

Diplomatic posts
Preceded by Edward Goschen	Envoy Extraordinary and Minister Plenipotentiary to His Majesty the King of Serbia; 1900–1903	Succeeded by James Beethom Whitehead
Preceded by Sir Conyngham Greene	Envoy Extraordinary and Minister Plenipotentiary to the Swiss Confederation; 1905–1909	Succeeded by Henry Bax-Ironside
Baronetage of the United Kingdom
Preceded by George Bonham	Baronet (of Malmesbury); 1863–1927	Succeeded by Eric Henry Bonham
