= Justice Bonham =

Justice Bonham may refer to:

- Benjamin F. Bonham (1828–1906), chief justice of the Oregon Supreme Court
- Milledge Lipscomb Bonham (1854–1943), chief justice of the South Carolina Supreme Court
