= George Bonham =

British colonial governor (1803-1863)

Sir George Bonham Bt KCB
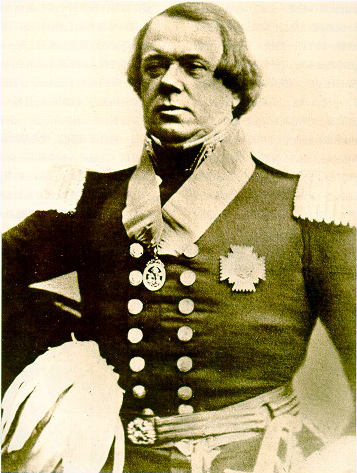

3rd Governor of Hong Kong
- In office 21 March 1848 – 13 April 1854
- Monarch: Victoria
- Lieutenant Governor: Maj Gen William Staveley; Maj Gen William Jervois
- Preceded by: Sir John Davis
- Succeeded by: Sir John Bowring

4th Governor of the Straits Settlements
- In office 18 November 1836 – January 1843
- Monarchs: William IV; Queen Victoria
- Preceded by: Kenneth Murchison
- Succeeded by: William Butterworth

3rd Resident Councillor of Singapore
- In office 7 December 1833 – 18 November 1836
- Preceded by: Kenneth Murchison
- Succeeded by: Thomas Church

Personal details
- Born: Samuel George Bonham; 7 September 1803 Faversham, Kent
- Died: 8 October 1863 (aged 60) Paddington, London
- Resting place: Kensal Green Cemetery, London
- Spouse: Ellen Emelia Barnard (m. 1846; died 1859)
- Children: George Francis Bonham
- Relatives: Isabella Charlotte Bonham (sister)
- Profession: Colonial Administrator

Sir Samuel George Bonham, 1st Baronet KCB (Chinese Translated Name 般咸, 文咸 or 文翰) (7 September 1803 – 8 October 1863) was a British colonial governor, who became the 4th Governor of the Straits Settlements and the 3rd Governor of Hong Kong.

== Early life ==
Samuel George Bonham was born in Faversham, Kent on 7 September 1803. He was the son of Captain George Bonham, of the maritime service of the East India Company. His mother, Isabella, the daughter of Robert Woodgate, was his father's second wife. He had one sister, also called Isabella, who married the Belgian count Ferdinand d'Oultremont. His father drowned in 1810.

When he was fifteen, he started working for the East India Company in Bencoolen, Sumatra.

== Governor of Straits Settlements ==
Bonham became deputy to the Governor of the Straits Settlements, Kenneth Murchison, in 1833. However, as Murchison was away from Southeast Asia for much of his governorship, Bonham was in effect responsible for the administration of the Straits Settlements. He took over from Murchison as Governor on 18 November 1836, a post he held until January 1843. He first governed from Penang, but later made Singapore the permanent residence of the Governor. During his governorship, Singapore grew in commercial importance as well as strategic significance as it supplied provisions for warships on their way to the Opium War in China. He was involved in the partial abolition of bond slavery, and provided a ship to combat piracy in the region. In an attempt to reduce the cost of administration, he reduced the number of senior officials from 19 to 8.

== Governor of Hong Kong ==
After a period of service with the East India Company, Bonham was appointed Governor of Hong Kong and plenipotentiary and superintendent of trade in China on 21 March 1848. During his tenure Bonham cut government spendings to balance the budget and also stimulated the Real Estate market in order to increase government income. His method of increasing government income eventually became the major source of income for the Hong Kong government a century later.

Bonham was appointed a Companion of the Order of the Bath (CB) in April 1848.

Bonham was known for his calm demeanor and gentle nature. It was due to these qualities that he gained the trust of the British Government and the good relationship of many Hong Kong people.

In 1850, upon his request to the Viceroy, a successful expedition was conducted against the pirates in the neighborhood of Hong Kong, and Bonham attempted to open direct communication with the central government at Peking, and in furtherance of this object sent Mr Medhurst to the Hai River with a dispatch, but the effort proved fruitless.

In 1853 after fall of Nanjing in 1853 during the Taiping Rebellion, the British became fearful of their foreign concession in Shanghai. After realizing the potential danger, Bonham called for a volunteer force to be created in Shanghai which would ultimately become the Shanghai Volunteer Corps which would participate in the Battle of Muddy Flat.

Bonham retired from the position of Governor in Hong Kong in April 1854 and returned to England.

== Baronet of Malmesbury ==
In November 1850 Bonham was promoted to Knight Commander of the Order of the Bath (KCB) as a reward for his services in China, and following his return to England a Baronetcy was conferred upon him on 27 November 1852.

== Personal life ==
In 1846, Bonham married Ellen Emelia Barnard, the eldest daughter of Thomas Barnard. They had one son, George Francis Bonham (28 August 1847 – 31 July 1927), who succeeded to the Baronetcy. Bonham's wife died in 1859 and he survived her until 8 October 1863, dying aged 60, of undisclosed causes. He was buried at Kensal Green Cemetery, London.

== Legacy ==
Fort Canning Hill in Singapore was formerly named after Bonham as Bukit Tuan Bonham (Malay: Sir Bonham's Hill), as was Bonham Street near Raffles Place, Singapore. Bonham Road and Bonham Strand on Hong Kong Island were also named after him.

== Bibliography ==
- Dod, Robert P. (1860). The Peerage, Baronetage and Knightage of Great Britain and Ireland. London: Whitaker and Co.
- Endacott, G. B. (2005) [1962]. A biographical sketch-book of early Hong Kong. Hong Kong University Press. ISBN 978-9622097421.

Government offices
Preceded by Kenneth Murchison	3rd Resident Councillor of Singapore; 1833 – 1836	Succeeded by Thomas Church
Preceded by Kenneth Murchison	4th Governor of the Straits Settlements; 1836 – 1843	Succeeded by William Butterworth
Preceded by Sir John Davis	3rd Governor of Hong Kong; 1848 – 1854	Succeeded by Sir John Bowring
Baronetage of the United Kingdom
New creation	Baronet (of Malmesbury); 1852 – 1863	Succeeded by George Francis Bonham
