= 1896 Cypriot legislative election =

Legislative elections were held in Cyprus between 4 and 6 November 1896.

== Electoral system ==
The Legislative Council consisted of six official members appointed by the High Commissioner and twelve elected members, three of which were Muslims and nine of which were non-Muslims.

The island was divided into three constituencies, each formed of two districts. Each constituency elected one Muslim and three non-Muslims. Muslim voters had one vote, whilst non-Muslims could vote for up to three candidates. Due to the high levels of illiteracy, voting was not secret, with voters required to tell the polling officers their candidates of choice, which they were required to do in front of the candidates or their agents.

Suffrage was limited to men aged over 21 who had been permanent residents during the five years prior to the elections, and who had paid either the verghi tax (which was levied as an annual payment of one four-thousandth of a property's value, 4% of rental income or 3% on profits or salaries) or rent for a dwelling or shop within the last year. The number of registered voters for the non-Muslim seats increased from 10,030 in 1891 to 12,093, while the number of Muslim voters increased from 2,303 to 2,670.

== Campaign ==
=== Muslim ===
The Larnaca–Famagusta constituency was contested by Evkaf official Ahmed Nafiz, lawyer Ahmed Mumtaz, Ahmed Naim and editor of the Zaman newspaper Ahmed Dervish.

The Limassol–Paphos constituency was contested by lawyer Ahmed Rashid Hadji Mehmet, landowner Emin Moustafa and merchant Hafuz Ramadan Eyoub.

The Nicosia–Kyrenia constituency was contested by incumbent MLC Hadji Hafuz Zyai, Mehmed Faik Bey, Abdullah Nadri and Hadji Halil Effendi Mehmed.

=== Non-Muslim ===
For the first time since the 1883 elections, all three non-Muslim seats were contested.

== Results ==
=== Muslim seats ===
In the Muslim seats, 1,540 of the 2,670 registered voters voted.

Constituency	Elected member	Notes
Larnaca–Famagusta	Ahmed Dervish	
Limassol–Paphos	Hafuz Ramadan Eyoub	
Nicosia–Kyrenia	Hadji Hafuz Zyai	Re-elected
Source: Cyprus Blue Book

=== Non-Muslim seats ===
Voting took place in Nicosia–Kyrenia on 4 November, in Larnaca–Famagusta on 5 and 6 November and in Limassol–Paphos on 6 November.

Constituency	Candidate	Votes	%	Notes
Larnaca–Famagusta	Ioannis Economidis	1,840	83.0	Re-elected
Larnaca–Famagusta	Achillea Liasides	1,686	76.0	Re-elected
Larnaca–Famagusta	Ioannis Vontitsianos	1,626	73.3	Elected
Larnaca–Famagusta	Nikolaos Rossos	781	35.2	Unseated
Larnaca–Famagusta	O. Iasonidis	186	8.4	
Limassol–Paphos	Onufrios Iasonidis	385	70.1	Elected
Limassol–Paphos	Kyrillos Papadopoulos	371	67.7	Elected
Limassol–Paphos	Socrates Fragoudis	261	47.5	Re-elected
Limassol–Paphos	Georgios Pavlidis	231	42.1	Unseated
Nicosia–Kyrenia	Theofanis Theodotou	1,512	83.6	Elected
Nicosia–Kyrenia	Paschalis Constantinides	1,488	82.3	Re-elected
Nicosia–Kyrenia	Yerasimo Christodulides	1,463	80.9	Elected
Nicosia–Kyrenia	Miltiadis Siakallis	433	23.9	
Total ballots cast		4,575		
Registered voters/turnout		12,093	37.83	
Source: Protopapas

== Aftermath ==
All non-Muslim elected members saw out their full five-year terms until the next elections in 1901.
