= Governor Swettenham =

Governor Swettenham may refer to:

- Alexander Swettenham (1846–1933), Governor of British Guiana from 1901 to 1904 and Governor of Jamaica from 1904 to 1907
- Frank Swettenham (1850–1946), 15th Governor and Commander-in-Chief of the Straits Settlements from 1901 to 1904
