= Kyrillos III of Cyprus =

Archbishop of Cyprus from 1916 to 1933

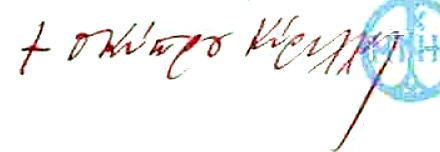
The signature of Cyril III, Archbishop of Cyprus (1859-1933)

Kyrillos III (nicknamed Kyrilloudin "small Kyrillos" to differentiate from Kyrillos II; born Panagiotis Vassiliou; 1859 – 16 November 1933), was the bishop of Kyrenia and later became the archbishop of the Cypriot Orthodox Church.

== Biography ==
Born in Prastio village of Mesaoria, Ottoman Cyprus, in 1859 he became monk at the age of 13 at St. Panteleimon Monastery in Myrtou village, Kyrenia District. He studied philosophy and theology at the University of Athens. In 1895 he was elected Bishop of Kyrenia and after the Kyrillos II' s death, he was elected Archbishop of Cyprus on 11 November 1916. Opponents of him in those elections were the Bishop of Kition Meletios, the Bishop of Kykkos Kleopas and archimandrite Makarios Myriantheas, later known as Makarios II who became Archbishop of Cyprus years later.

He was more moderate than his predecessor Kyrillos II and was accused of being too sympathetic to the British colonial rulers of Cyprus. He was also elected as one of the 6 Christian Legislators in the Legislative Council of Cyprus.

Archbishop Kyrillos died on 16 November 1933 of pleurisy.

In March 2010 his grave was vandalised.

Religious titles
Preceded by Kyrillos II	Archbishop of Cyprus; 1916–1933	Succeeded by Leontius
