= William Thomas Taylor =

British colonial administrator (1848–1931)

Sir William Thomas Taylor KCMG
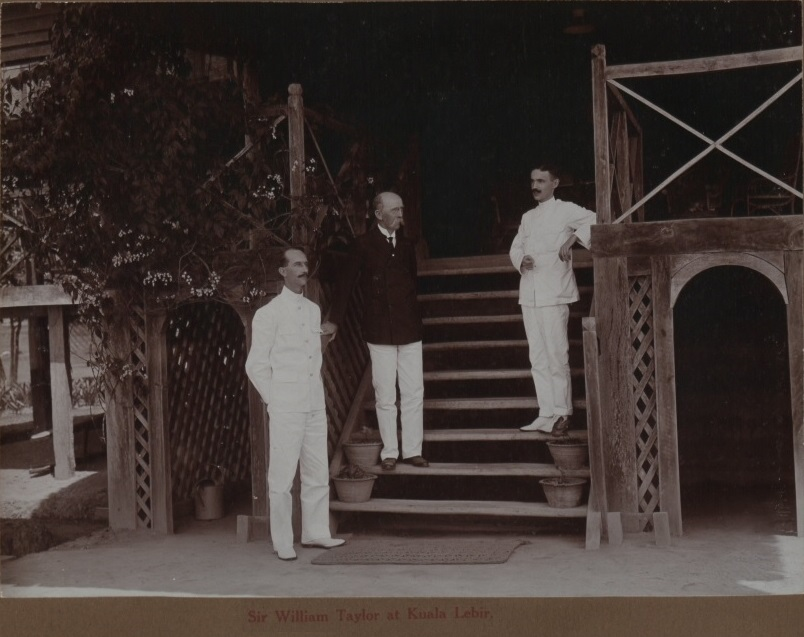
- Sir William Taylor (center) at Kuala Lebir (present day, Kuala Krai District), Kelantan, July 1909.

Resident-General of the Federated Malay States
- In office 1905–1911
- Preceded by: Sir William Hood Treacher
- Succeeded by: Sir Arthur Henderson Young

8th Colonial Secretary of Straits Settlements
- In office 5 July 1901 – 31 December 1904
- Monarch: Edward VII
- Governor: Sir Frank Swettenham; Sir John Anderson
- Preceded by: Sir James Alexander Swettenham; Sir Walter Egerton (Acting); C W Sneyd-Kynnersley (Acting)
- Succeeded by: Frederick George Penney

21st Accountant General and Controller of Revenue
- In office 10 June 1895 – 1 March 1902
- Preceded by: James Alexander Swettenham
- Succeeded by: Francis Robert Ellis

Personal details
- Born: 10 November 1848
- Died: 8 March 1931 (aged 82) Vence, Alpes Maritimes
- Spouse: Mabel Ruth Mason (m. 1914–1931)
- Occupation: Colonial Administrator

Sir William Thomas Taylor, KCMG (10 November 1848 – 18 March 1931) was a British colonial administrator.

== Career ==
Taylor began his career in colonial service as Collector of Customs and Excise in Larnaca (Cyprus) in 1879, subsequently being promoted to Receiver-General and Chief Collector of Customs and Excise of Cyprus.

He was appointed the 21st Accountant General and Controller of Revenue of Ceylon on 10 June 1895, succeeding James Alexander Swettenham, and held the office until 1 March 1902. He was succeeded by F. R. Ellis.

In July 1901, he was appointed as the 8th Colonial Secretary of Singapore, taking up his position there until 1904.

He was confirmed in the appointment of Resident-General for the Federated Malay States in January 1905 and made KCMG that year in recognition of his services. He held the post until 1911.

== Honours ==
Taylor was awarded Companion of St. Michael and St. George (CMG) in 1895 New Year Honours and Knight Commander of St. Michael and St. George (KCMG) in 1905 Birthday Honours.

== Family ==
Taylor married Mabel Ruth Mason on 14 July 1914, the widow of Mr J Scott Mason of F.M.S. Civil Service.

Government offices
Preceded by Sir William Hood Treacher	Resident-General of the Federated Malay States; 1905–1911	Succeeded by Sir Arthur Henderson Young
Preceded by Sir James Alexander Swettenham; Sir Walter Egerton (Acting)	Colonial Secretary of Straits Settlements; 1901–1904	Succeeded by Frederick George Penney
Legal offices
Preceded by James Alexander Swettenham	Accountant General and Controller of Revenue; 1895–1902	Succeeded by Francis Robert Ellis
