= Charles Walter Sneyd-Kynnersley =

British colonial administrator

Charles Walter Sneyd-Kynnersley CMG

Acting Colonial Secretary of Straits Settlements
- In office 7 December 1899 – 5 July 1901 Serving with Sir Walter Egerton
- Monarchs: Victoria; Edward VII
- Governor: James Alexander Swettenham (Acting)
- Preceded by: James Alexander Swettenham
- Succeeded by: Sir William Thomas Taylor

Resident Councillor of Penang
- In office 1897–1904
- Preceded by: Allan Maclean Skinner
- Succeeded by: James Kortright Birch

Resident Councillor of Malacca
- In office 1895–1897
- Preceded by: Dudley Francis Amelius Hervey
- Succeeded by: Arthur Philip Talbot

Personal details
- Born: 1849
- Died: 11 July 1904 (aged 54–55) Wimbledon, London
- Cause of death: heart failure
- Spouse: Ada Maud (m. 1884–1904)
- Parent: Thomas Clement Sneyd-Kynnersley (father)
- Occupation: Colonial Administrator

Charles Walter Sneyd-Kynnersley CMG (1849 - 11 July 1904) (also known as C W Sneyd-Kynnersley or C W S Kynnersley), was a British colonial administrator. He joined the Straits Settlements Civil Service in 1872 and was the acting Colonial Secretary of Straits Settlements.

== Career ==
Charles joined the Straits Settlements Civil Service in 1872.

In 1877, he was appointed Superintendent of Prisons in Penang.

In 1881, he was appointed the First Magistrate of Penang and as First Magistrate of Singapore in 1890.

In 1895, he was appointed as the Resident Councillor of Malacca.

In 1897, he was appointment as the Resident Councillor of Penang was made permanent after A M Skinner retired.

In 1899, he was the acting colonial secretary serving alongside Sir Walter Egerton, after the sudden death of Sir Charles Mitchell (Governor of Straits Settlements), with James Alexander Swettenham (Colonial Secretary) being appointed the Acting Governor.

=== Kynnersley Report ===
In January 1902, Charles was appointed by the Legislative Council to set up a commission to study and report on the system of English education in the Straits Settlements, especially pertaining to secondary and technical education and was presented to the Legislative Council on 6 June 1902. The resultant report was known as Report of the Commission of Enquiry into the System of English Education in the Colony.

== Personal life ==
Charles Walter Sneyd-Kynnersley was born in 1849 and was the son of Thomas Clement Sneyd-Kynnersley, of Moor Green, Worcestershire and was educated at Rugby, Warwickshire.

He married Ada Maud, daughter of Rev. George Nash, Prebendary of Salisbury in 1884.

He died from heart failure on 11 July 1904 at Wimbledon, London.

After his death, Ada Maud remarried with Sir Walter Egerton.

== Honour ==
Charles was invested with Companion of the Most Distinguished Order of St. Michael and St. George (CMG) in 1899 New Year Honours.

Government offices
Preceded by Dudley Francis Amelius Hervey	Resident Councillor of Malacca; 1895–1897	Succeeded by Arthur Philip Talbot
Preceded by Allan Maclean Skinner	Resident Councillor of Penang; 1897–1904	Succeeded by James Kortright Birch
Preceded by James Alexander Swettenham	Acting Colonial Secretary of Straits Settlements; 1899–1901; Served alongside: Sir Walter Egerton	Succeeded by Sir William Thomas Taylor
