= Walter Egerton =

British governor (1858–1947)

Sir Walter Egerton KCMG
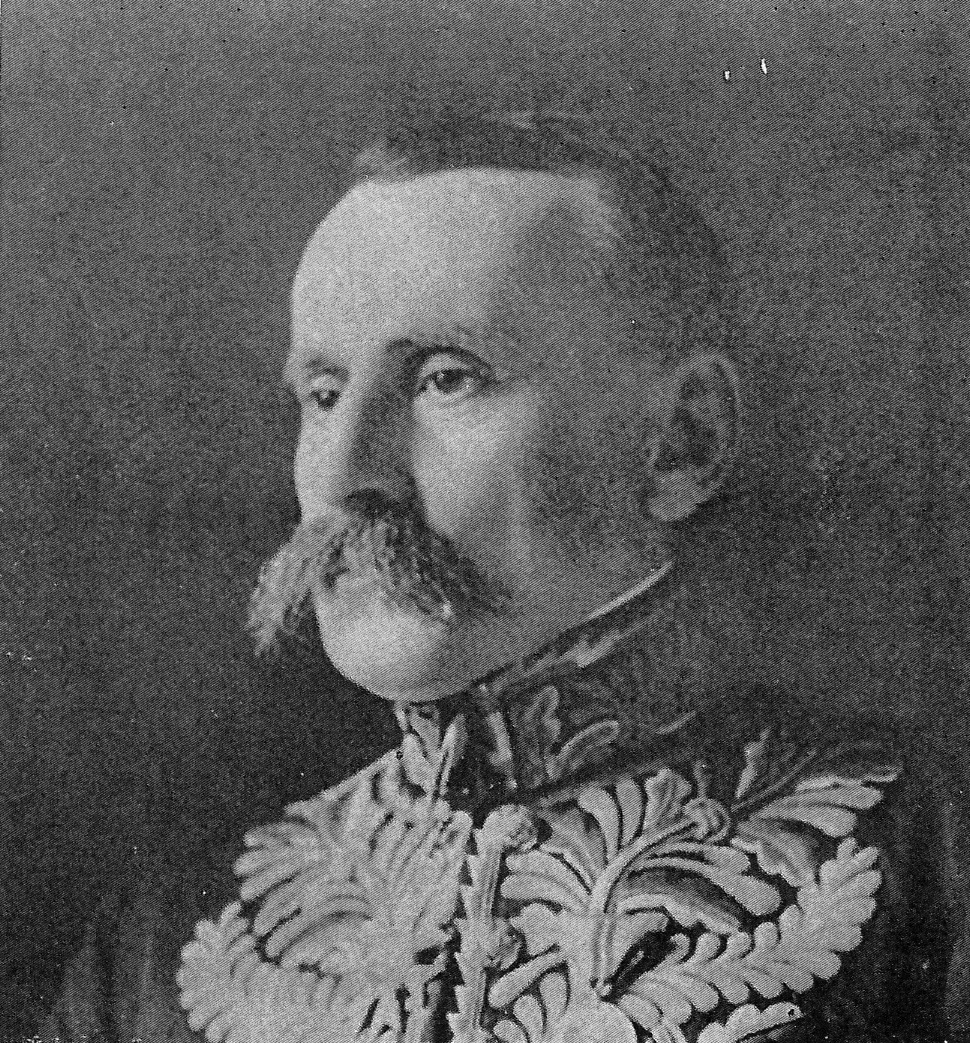

Governor of British Guiana
- In office 5 July 1912 – 15 April 1917
- Monarchs: Queen Victoria; Edward VII
- Preceded by: Frederick Mitchell Hodgson
- Succeeded by: Wilfred Collet

Governor of Southern Nigeria
- In office August 1904 – 1912
- Preceded by: Ralph Moor
- Succeeded by: Frederick Lugard

Governor of Lagos Colony
- In office 1903 – 28 February 1906
- Preceded by: William MacGregor
- Succeeded by: Post abolished

Resident, Negeri Sembilan
- In office 1902–1903
- Preceded by: Henry Conway Belfield
- Succeeded by: Douglas Graham Campbell

Acting Colonial Secretary of Straits Settlements
- In office 1899 – 5 July 1901 Serving with Charles Walter Sneyd-Kynnersley
- Preceded by: Sir James Alexander Swettenham
- Succeeded by: Sir William Thomas Taylor

Lieutenant-Governor of British New Guinea
- In office 1895–1897
- Preceded by: New creation
- Succeeded by: George Le Hunte

Administrator of British New Guinea
- In office 1888–1895
- Preceded by: John Douglas as Special Commissioner of British New Guinea
- Succeeded by: Post abolished

Personal details
- Born: 1858
- Died: 22 March 1947 (aged 88–89) Fair Meadow, Mayfield, Sussex, United Kingdom
- Spouse: Ada Maud Sneyd-Kynnersley (m. 1905; died 1934)

Sir Walter Egerton, KCMG (1858 – 22 March 1947) was a British colonial administrator who was Governor of Lagos Colony from 1904 to 1906, Governor of Southern Nigeria from 1906 to 1912, and Governor of British Guiana from 1912 to 1917.

== Early career ==
Egerton was born the only son of Walter Egerton, a gentleman of Exeter, Devon. After an education at Tonbridge School, in 1880, Egerton went out from England to the Straits Settlements as a cadet and for several years served there and in the protected states of Malaya. In 1880, aged about 21, he was a Magistrate at Singapore; in 1883 he became Collector at Penang; he was next a Commissioner of the Court of Requests at Penang and was appointed Acting Resident there in 1894; In 1888, he was an acting First Magistrate at Penang, to which position he was later appointed. Egerton was admitted to the Middle Temple on 27 April 1888 and was Called to the Bar on 17 June 1896. He acted as the Colonial Secretary for the Straits Settlements between 1899 and 1901.

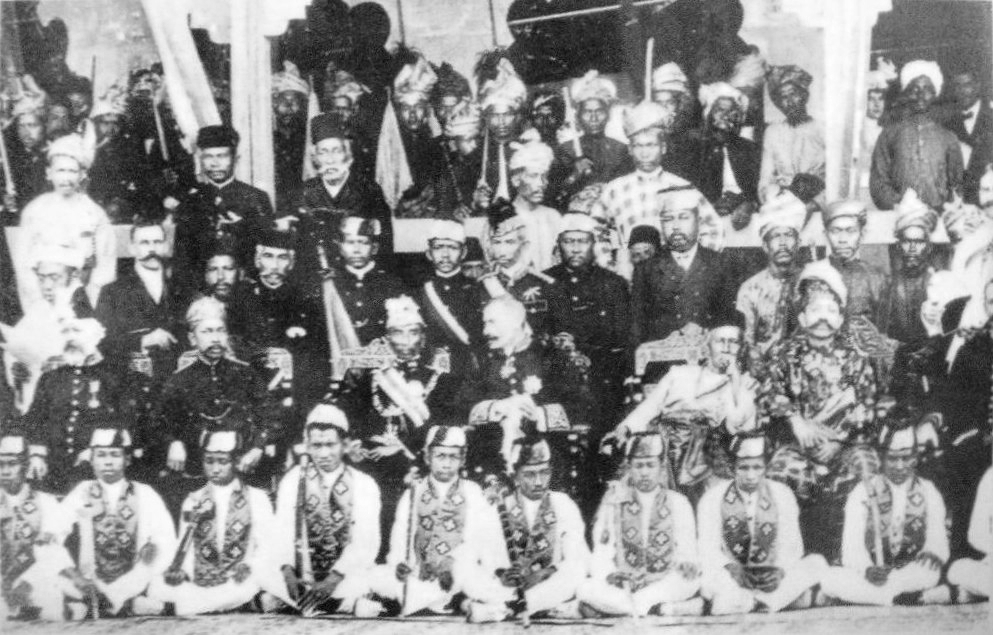
A commemorative group photograph taken at the 2nd Durbar held on 20 July 1903. sitting from left to right: William Treacher (resident-general), Sultan Alaiddin Sulaiman of Selangor, Sultan Idris of Perak, Sir Frank Swettenham (governor), Sultan Ahmad Maatham of Pahang, Tuanku Muhammad (Yang di-Pertuan Besar of Negeri Sembilan), Walter Egerton (resident-general of Negeri Sembilan)

Egerton was Resident in the protected state of Negeri Sembilan (1902–03). In this role, he got involved in the laws related to a form of servitude where a woman's illegitimate children were given into the custody of the local ruler. Egerton decided that this was contrary to Sharia law, and that the children belonged to their mothers. In this he was supported by the Sultan of Perak.

When Egerton became Governor of Lagos Colony in 1903 he already had more than twenty years of experience in the colonial service in the far east. Jalan Penghulu Cantik in Seremban was once named Egerton Road in his memory.

== Nigeria ==
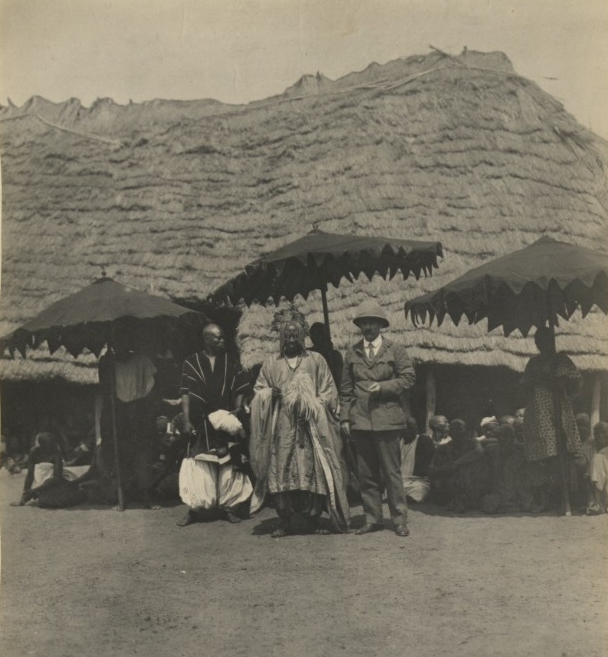
Alafin of Oyo and Sir Walter Egerton, ca. 1910

Egerton became Governor of Lagos Colony, covering most of the Yoruba lands in the southwest of what is now Nigeria, in 1903. The colonial office wanted to amalgamate the Lagos Colony with the protectorate of Southern Nigeria, and in August 1904, also appointed Egerton as High Commissioner for the Southern Nigeria Protectorate. He held both offices until 28 February 1906. On that date the two territories were formally united and Egerton was appointed Governor of the new Colony and Protectorate of Southern Nigeria, holding office until 1912. In the new Southern Nigeria, the old Lagos Colony became the Western Province, and the former Southern Nigerian Protectorate was split into a Central Province with capital at Warri and an Eastern Province with capital at Calabar.

When his predecessor in Southern Nigeria, Sir Ralph Denham Rayment Moor, resigned, a large part of the southeast of Nigeria was still outside British control. On taking office, Egerton began a policy of sending out annual pacification patrols, which generally obtained submission through the threat of force without being required to actually use force. Egerton had a somewhat abrupt manner in his dealings with the Colonial Office. In a letter of 1910 he wrote a letter describing the salary of one of his employees as "niggardly". The recipient was highly offended, and said he should be called to order.

When Egerton became Governor of Lagos he enthusiastically endorsed the extension of the Lagos – Ibadan railway onward to Oshogbo, and the project was approved in November 1904. Construction began in January 1905 and the line reached Oshogbo in April 1907. He favored rail over river transport, and pushed to have the railway further extended to Kano by way of Zaria. He also sponsored extensive road construction, building on the legislative foundation laid by his predecessor Moor which enabled use of unpaid local labor. Egerton shared Moor's views on the damage that was being done to the Cross River trade by the combination of indigenous middlemen and traders based in Calabar. The established traders at first got the Colonial Office to pass rules inhibiting competition from traders willing to set up bases further inland, but with some difficulty Egerton persuaded the officials to reverse their ruling.

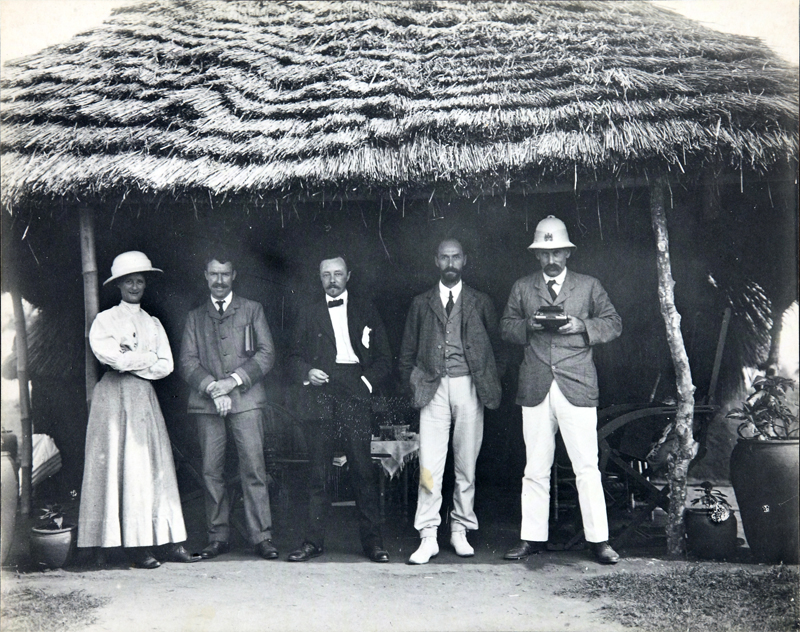
Sir Walter Egerton (far right) with his wife and other westerners in Lagos, c. 1910

Egerton was a strong advocate of colonial development. He believed in deficit financing at certain periods of a colony's growth, which was reflected in his budgets from 1906 to 1912. He had a constant struggle to obtain approval for these budgets from the colonial office. As early as 1908, Egerton supported the idea of "a properly organized Agricultural Department with an energetic and experienced head", and the Department of Agriculture came into being in 1910. Egerton endorsed the development of rubber plantations, a concept familiar to him from his time in Malaya, and arranged for land to be leased for this purpose. This was the foundation of a highly successful industry. He also thought there could be great potential in the tin fields near Bauchi, and thought that if proven a branch line to the tin fields would be justified.

Egerton came into conflict with the administration of Northern Nigeria on a number of issues. There was debate over whether Ilorin should be incorporated into Southern Nigeria since the people were Yoruba, or remain in Northern Nigeria since the ruler was Muslim and for some time Ilorin had been subject to the Uthmaniyya Caliphate. There was argument about the administration of duties on goods landed on the coast and carried into Northern Nigeria. And there was dispute over whether railway lines from the north should terminate at Lagos or should take alternative routes to the Niger River and the coast. Egerton had reason on his side in objecting to the proposed line terminating at Baro on the Niger, since navigation southward to the coast was restricted to the high water season, and even then was uncertain.

It is said that the Old Secretariat, Marina is built in an E-shape manner in honour of him.

Egerton's administration imposed policies that tended towards segregation of Europeans and Africans. These included excluding Africans from the West African Medical Service and saying that no European should take orders from an African, which had the effect of ruling out African doctors from serving with the army. Egerton himself did not always approve of these policies, and they were not strictly upheld. The legal relationship between the Lagos government and the Yoruba states of the Lagos Colony was not clear, and it was not until 1908 that Egerton persuaded the Obas to accept the establishment of the Supreme Court in the main towns.

== Later career ==
In 1912, Egerton was replaced by Frederick Lugard, who was appointed Governor-General of both Southern and Northern Nigeria with the mandate to unite the two. Egerton was appointed Governor of British Guiana as his next posting, clearly a demotion, which may have been connected to his fights with the Colonial Office officials. He was Governor of British Guiana from 1912 until 1917. In May 1914 it was reported that Egerton had a plan to build a railway from the coast to the Brazilian border, a distance of 340 miles (550 km). The new line would open up gold and diamond fields as well as supporting timber extraction and development of arable land. The main problem was obtaining the funding. Years later, Egerton said "if you ask what my policy is, I should say 'open means of communication' and if you wish for additional information, I would reply 'open more of them!'"

== Honours and private life ==
Egerton was appointed a Companion of the Order of St Michael and St George (CMG) in November 1901, and in 1905 became a Knight Commander (KCMG) of the same order. In 1911, he received the honorary degree of Doctor of Laws from the University of Edinburgh.

In 1905, Egerton married Ada Maud Sneyd-Kynnersley OBE, a daughter of the Rev. George Lloyd Nash and the widow of C. W. Sneyd-Kynnersley CMG. After his retirement to England, Egerton became a member of the Junior Carlton and the Royal Automobile Club. His wife died on 20 December 1934, and Egerton survived her until 22 March 1947. At the time of his death, his address was stated in Who's Who as "Fair Meadow, Mayfield, Sussex".

Government offices
Preceded by John Douglas as Special Commissioner of British New Guinea	Administrator of British New Guinea; 1888–1895	Post abolished
New creation	Lieutenant-Governor of British New Guinea; 1895–1897	Succeeded by George Le Hunte
Preceded by James Alexander Swettenham	Colonial Secretary, Straits Settlements (Acting); 1899–1901; Served alongside: Sir Charles Walter Sneyd-Kynnersley	Succeeded by Sir William Thomas Taylor
Preceded by Henry Conway Belfield	Resident, Negeri Sembilan; 1902–1903	Succeeded by Douglas Graham Campbell
Preceded by William MacGregor	Governor of Lagos; 1903–1906	Post abolished
Preceded by Ralph Moor	Governor of Southern Nigeria; 1904–1912	Succeeded by Frederick Lugard
Preceded by Frederick Mitchell Hodgson	Governor of British Guiana; 1912–1917	Succeeded by Wilfred Collet
