= James Westland =

James Westland may refer to:

- James Westland (footballer) (1916–1972), Scottish footballer
- James Westland (civil servant) (1842–1903), British financier and colonial administrator
