= Prastio, Famagusta =

Prastio: Πραστειό (Greek); Dörtyol (Turkish)
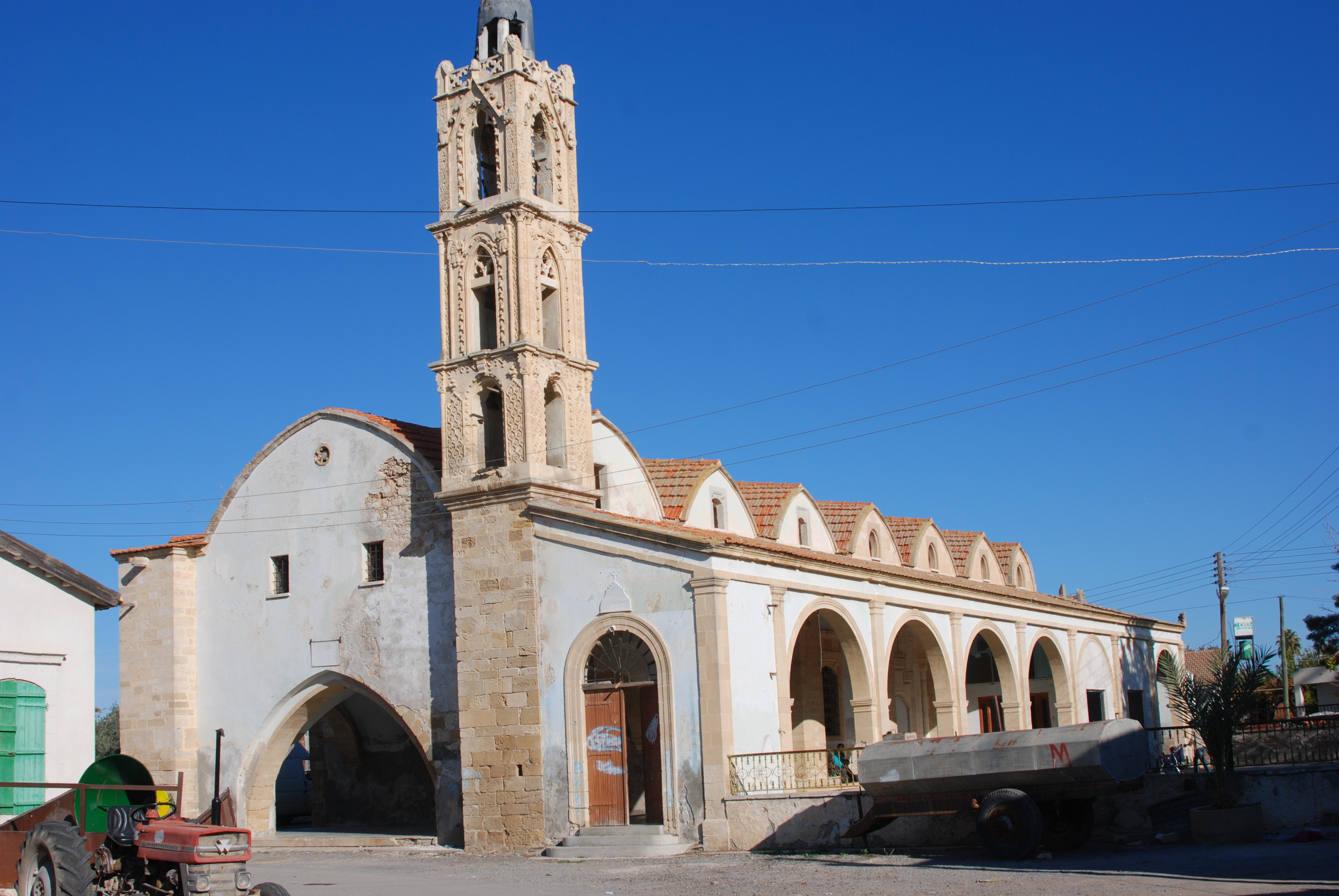
- St. George's Church

- Location within Cyprus
- Coordinates: 35°10′32″N 33°45′24″E
- Country (de jure): Cyprus
  - District: Famagusta District
- Country (de facto): Northern Cyprus
  - District: Gazimağusa District

Government
  - Muhtar: Salih Erer

Population (2011)
  - Total: 1,349
- Time zone: UTC+2 (EET)
  - Summer (DST): UTC+3 (EEST)

Prastio (Greek: Πραστειό; Turkish: Dörtyol) is a small village in Cyprus, 19 km west of Famagusta. De facto, it is under the control of Northern Cyprus. It is administered by the municipality of Sinta (İnönü).

In the Ottoman period, the village was a mixed one, though the Turkish Cypriots were a small minority. The 1891 census recorded a population of 704, with 637 Greek and 67 Turkish Cypriots. In 1973, Prastio had a population of about 1,000, all of whom were Greek Cypriots. The Greek Cypriot inhabitants fled from the Turkish army in the 1974 Turkish invasion of Cyprus. Today, Prastio is inhabited by Turks from Adana, Osmaniye and Sivas provinces and a small number of displaced Turkish Cypriots. The village is home to the historic Agios Georgios Church (Agios Georgios O Sporos), which has a reference to 1823 on its door and to 1867 on its window. The eastern façade has Neo-Gothic elements and an Ottoman inscription exists over its western door. It is cross-vaulted and has galleries in the north and south. After 1974, it was converted to a mosque. In 2001, a new mosque, which was built by the Evkaf Administration, was opened in the village.

The village is the birthplace of Kirillos III (birth 1859), Archbishop of Cyprus between 1916 and 1933, the year of his death. The Sigouri Castle can be found south of Prastio.
