= Sigouri Castle =

Castle in Cyprus

Coordinates: 35.1417°N 33.7466°E

- (Greek: Κάστρο του Σιγουρίου, της Σιγουρής Turkish: Sigur Kalesi)
- Interactive map of the Sigouri Castle area

General information
- Architectural style: Medieval
- Location: de jure Cyprus de facto Northern Cyprus
- Construction started: 1391

Sigouri Castle (Greek: Κάστρο του Σιγουρίου, της Σιγουρής Turkish: Sigur Kalesi) was a medieval castle in Cyprus of which there are no remains. Its location facilitated as a stopover for troops from Nicosia, the capital, on their way to the coastal harbours of either Famagusta or Larnaca. It is de facto situated in Northern Cyprus. The castle was built in 1391 as a frontier fortress, after the Genoese conquest of Famagusta. It fell into disuse after the Venetian takeover of the island.

== History ==
Sigouri is situated 4 kilometres (2.5 miles) south of Prastio. Of no significance today, the location was once a crossroads for travellers heading to Famagusta, Kyrenia, Limassol and Larnaka. Before the castle's construction the location served as the seat of the Archbishop of Nicosia. In 1191, Cyprus was taken by Richard the Lionheart during his campaign against the island's ruler Isaac Komnenos of Cyprus. Richard subsequently sold the island to the Knights Templar who in turn sold it to Guy of Lusignan of the House of Lusignan after a revolt in Nicosia destroyed the Templar castle there. A period of peace ended with the death of Hugh I of Cyprus in 1218. A struggle over who should act as the kingdom's regent ensued, pitting the House of Ibelin with the local supporters of Frederick II, Holy Roman Emperor. Frederick's arrival in Limassol in 1228 escalated the conflict into an open war. In 1373, Cyprus was invaded by the Republic of Genoa which established a colony centered at Famagusta and imprisoned much of the Lusignan nobility.

According to Philip of Novara's chronicle, prince John of Antioch managed to escape from Famagusta after disguising himself as the valet of his cook. John subsequently fled to the Kantara Castle, from which he organized a successful counteroffensive which expelled the Genoese from much of the island after the latter failed to capture Kantara. The loss of Famagusta increased Sigouri's importance, as both as a trading hub and an outpost guarding the Lusignans from Genoese raids. Upon his return to his homeland in 1385, James I of Cyprus focused on improving the kingdom's fortifications. In 1391, he established a fortified base at Sigouri. Kantara, Sigouri, La Cava and Nicosia formed a protective axis against potential Genoese invasion of the inland. In September 1460, James II of Cyprus took the castle as his first military objective in his invasion of the island. Shortly afterwards he retook Famagusta, again diminishing Sigouri's importance. In the 14th century, the castle fell into disuse and was partially demolished when the island came under the control of the Republic of Venice.

== Architecture ==
Next to nothing remains of the castle today, thus information on the castle's features is drawn from medieval chronicles. Sigouri was located on an earthen platform 3 metres (9.8 ft) above ground level. It had four square corner towers, the towers had barrel vaulted basements, one of which housed a cistern. It had a simple design reminiscent of 12th century castrum style fortifications, with a drawbridge equipped gateway. It was surrounded by 35 metres (115 ft) wide ditches filled with water from the nearby Pedieos river which likely dried down during the summer season. Sigouri occasionally served as an arms depot.
