= 1895 New Year Honours =

Appointments by Queen Victoria

The 1895 New Year Honours were appointments by Queen Victoria to various orders and honours to reward and highlight good works by members of the British Empire. They were published on 1 January 1895.

The recipients of honours are displayed here as they were styled before their new honour, and arranged by honour, with classes (Knight, Knight Grand Cross, etc.) and then divisions (Military, Civil, etc.) as appropriate.

== Order of the Star of India ==
=== Knights Grand Commander (GCSI) ===
- His Highness Shahu Chatrapati Maharaj, Raja of Kolhapur

=== Knights Commander (KCSI) ===
- James Westland, Esq, CSI, Member of the Council of the Governor-General of India.
- Frederick William Richards Fryer, Esq, CSI, Officiating Financial Commissioner, Punjab.
- His Highness Maharao Kesri Singh of Sirohi
- Courtenay Peregrine Ilbert, Esq, CSI, CIE

=== Companions (CSI) ===
- Charles Cecil Stevens, Esq, Indian Civil Service.
- Major-General Alexander Robert Badcock, CB, Indian Staff Corps, Commissary-General-in-Chief, India.
- Donald Mackenzie Smeaton, Esq, Financial Commissioner, Burma.
- Stephen Jacob, Esq, Indian Civil Service.
- Colonel William Francis Prideaux, Indian Staff Corps.

== Order of the Indian Empire ==
=== Knights Commander (KCIE) ===
- Raja Sudhal Deb of Bamra, CIE
- Colonel Henry Ravenshaw Thuillier, RE, CIE, Surveyor-General of India.
- Nawab Sidi Ahmad Khan Sidi Ibrahim Khan of Janjira
- Raja Sri Rao Vencatesveta Chalapati Ranga Rao Bahadur of Bobbili
- Lt. Col. Adalbert Cecil Talbot

=== Companions (CIE) ===
- Fazlbhai Visram, Esq, Additional Member of the Council of the Governor-General of India.
- Thomas David Little, Esq
- Colonel Henry Sullivan Jarrett
- Colonel Henry Bristow Sanderson, Indian Staff Corps
- Dewan Rao Bahadur Jhujjhar Singh Jee Deo of Charkhari
- Rai Durgngati Banerjee Bahadur
- Arthur Crommelin Hankin, Esq
- Adam Gillis Tytler, Esq
- Veterinary Captain Joshua Arthur Nunn, DSO, Principal, Veterinary College, Lahore.
- Khan Bahadur Hak Nawaz Khan

== Order of St Michael and St George ==
=== Knights Grand Cross (GCMG) ===
- Sir Arthur Elibank Havelock, KCMG, Governor and Commander-in-Chief of the Island of Ceylon.
- The Honourable Sir Samuel Walker Griffith, KCMG, Chief Justice and formerly Premier of the Colony of Queensland.

=== Knights Commander (KCMG) ===
- The Honourable Mackenzie Bowell, Prime Minister of the Dominion of Canada, President of the recent Colonial Conference at Ottawa.
- The Honourable James Wilson Agnew, MD, Member of the Executive Council and formerly Premier of the Colony of Tasmania.

=== Companions (CMG) ===
- Nicholas Darnell Davis, Esq, Comptroller of Customs and Member of the Court of Policy of the Colony of British Guiana.
- John Noble, Esq, Clerk of the House of Assembly of the Colony of the Cape of Good Hope.
- Samuel Deering, Esq, late Assistant Agent General and Assistant Emigration Agent in London for the Colony of South Australia.
- William Thomas Taylor, Esq., Receiver-General and Chief Collector of Customs and Excise of the Island of Cyprus.
- James Stewart, Esq, Assistant Colonial Secretary of the Colony of Fiji.
- Walter Henry Harris, Esq, in recognition of services as Member of the Royal Commission for the British Section of the Chicago Exhibition.
