= 1891 Cypriot legislative election =

Legislative elections were held in Cyprus on 7 November 1891.

== Electoral system ==
The Legislative Council consisted of six official members appointed by the High Commissioner and twelve elected members, three of which were Muslims and nine of which were non-Muslims.

The island was divided into three constituencies, each formed of two districts. Each constituency elected one Muslim and three non-Muslims. Muslim voters had one vote, whilst non-Muslims could vote for up to three candidates. Due to the high levels of illiteracy, voting was not secret, with voters required to tell the polling officers their candidates of choice, which they were required to do in front of the candidates or their agents.

Suffrage was limited to men aged over 21 who had been permanent residents during the five years prior to the elections, and who had paid either the verghi tax (which was levied as an annual payment of one four-thousandth of a property's value, 4% of rental income or 3% on profits or salaries) or rent for a dwelling or shop within the last year. However, of the estimated 40,000 taxpayers in the territory at the time of the elections, only those that had been able to pay their taxes on time were able to register to vote. The number of registered voters for the non-Muslim seats dropped from 15,408 in 1886 to 10,030.

== Campaign ==
=== Muslim ===
In the Limassol–Paphos constituency, there were two Muslim candidates; incumbent MLC and lawyer Ahmed Rashid and landowner Emin Effendi Kadijikzadeh.

The Nicosia–Kyrenia constituency was also contested by two Muslim candidates; lawyer Baroutchizade Ahmet Vassif and Hadji Sofou Effendi.

The Larnaca–Famagusta constituency was contested by two Muslim candidates; incumbent MLC Mehmed Naim and Zuhti bin Hadji Hassan.

=== Non-Muslim ===
In Limassol–Paphos there were only non-Muslim three candidates; incumbent MLC Aristotle Paleologos, former MLC (1886–1889) Socrates Fragoudis, and the lawyer Ioannis Kyriakidis.

The Nicosia–Kyrenia constituency also only had three non-Muslim candidates; incumbent MLCs Paschalis Constantinides and Kyrillos Papadopoulos, and Yerasimo Hadji Diako, the Abbot of Kykkos Monastery.

The Larnaca–Famagusta constituency was the only one to have a contested vote, with seven candidates running; incumbent MLCs Achillea Liasides, Richardos Matei and Nikolaos Rossos, Loukas Paisiou (a teacher), Georgios Siakallis (a landowner and lawyer), Ioannis Vontitsianos (a farmer) and Arthur Young, the Commissioner of Famagusta. Liasides was the incumbent MLC for Nicosia–Kyrenia, but had switched constituency to allow Yerasimo Hadji Diako to be elected unopposed, having been promised the full support of the church in his re-election campaign. As a British official, Young's candidacy was controversial, with Greek Cypriot politicians convinced it was a ploy by the government to reduce Greek representation in the council, whilst Greek language newspapers called for voters not to vote for him. Young's British superiors were also unhappy with his decision to run, with High Commissioner Henry Ernest Gascoyne Bulwer writing to Secretary of State for the Colonies Lord Knutsford, stating that he had strong reservations about Young being a candidate as he suspected Young would neglect his official duties and would not be sufficiently independent of government when serving in the council.

== Results ==
=== Muslim seats ===
Constituency	Elected member
Larnaca–Famagusta	Zuhti bin Hadji Hassan
Limassol–Paphos	Ahmed Rashid
Nicosia–Kyrenia	Baroutchizade Ahmet Vassif
Source: Cyprus Gazette

=== Non-Muslim seats ===
Turnout was significantly higher than in the 1886 elections, which was attributed to Young's candidacy.

Constituency	Candidate	Votes	%	Notes
Larnaca–Famagusta	Achillea Liasides	1,450	66.6	Re-elected
Larnaca–Famagusta	Georgios Siakallis	1,444	66.4	Elected
Larnaca–Famagusta	Nikolaos Rossos	1,009	46.4	Re-elected
Larnaca–Famagusta	Ioannis Vontitsianos	842	38.7	
Larnaca–Famagusta	Arthur Young	493	22.7	
Larnaca–Famagusta	Loukas Paisiou	434	19.9	
Larnaca–Famagusta	Richardos Matei	117	5.4	Unseated
Limassol–Paphos	Socrates Fragoudis	–	–	Elected unopposed
Limassol–Paphos	Ioannis Kyriakidis	–	–	Elected unopposed
Limassol–Paphos	Aristotle Paleologos	–	–	Re-elected unopposed
Nicosia–Kyrenia	Paschalis Constantinides	–	–	Re-elected unopposed
Nicosia–Kyrenia	Yerasimo Hadji Diako	–	–	Elected unopposed
Nicosia–Kyrenia	Kyrillos Papadopoulos	–	–	Re-elected unopposed
Total ballots cast		2,176		
Registered voters/turnout		4,466	48.7	
Source: Protopapas

== Aftermath ==
Following the elections, Young submitted an appeal to the Supreme Court, calling for the election of Liasides and Siakallis to be overturned. The case was heard between 29 December 1891 and 6 January 1892 and attracted significant interest from the press. Young claimed that Kyrillos Papadopoulos (the Metropolitan of Kyrenia) and the Archimandrite Philotheus had persuaded their followers not to vote for him through religious threats, and had provided voters with transport on polling day. The judge found both Papadopoulos and the Archimandrite guilty of corruption and intimidation, and fined them. The election of Liasides and Siakallis was annulled, and a by-election for the two vacant seats scheduled for 11 February 1892. However, Liasides and Siakallis were easily re-elected, and the fines for the priests were paid by fundraising efforts.

1892 Larnaca–Famagusta by-election
Candidate	Votes	Notes
Achillea Liasides	1,241	Elected
Georgios Siakallis	1,132	Elected
Ioannis Vontitsianos	340	
G. Pantelidis	227	
Richardos Matei	36	
Source: Protopapas

There were no further changes in the non-Muslim membership until the resignation of Limassol–Paphos representatives Aristotle Paleologos for health reasons in January 1896. In the subsequent by-election on 8 February, Ioannis Economidis was returned unopposed. Around the same time, one of the other Limassol–Paphos MLCs, Ioannis Kyriakides resigned, resulting in a by-election on 3 February in which Georgios Pavlidis was returned unopposed.

Haji Hafuz Zyai replaced Baroutchizade Ahmet Vassif as Muslim MLC for Nicosia–Kyrenia in 1895.
