= Constance Sydney Holmes =

Lady Swettenham
- Born: Constance Sydney Holmes; 1858
- Died: 22 November 1947 (aged 88–89); Wyke House Lunatic Asylum, Isleworth, Middlesex
- Spouse: Frank Swettenham (m. 1878; div. 1938)
- Parent(s): Cecil Frederick Holmes; Constantia Louisa Laugher

Constance Sydney Holmes (1858 – 22 November 1947), usually known as Sydney Swettenham, was the first wife of British colonial official Frank Swettenham, the first Resident-General of the Federated Malay States.

== Early life ==
She was the oldest daughter of Cecil Frederick Holmes, who was master of Druries House at Harrow School, and Constantia Louisa Laugher. Among her siblings was younger sister Violet Marion Holmes (a wife of Bertram Pemberton Stedall and Edward Burgess Weatherall). The family were members of the well-to-do Victorian middle class.

== Personal life ==
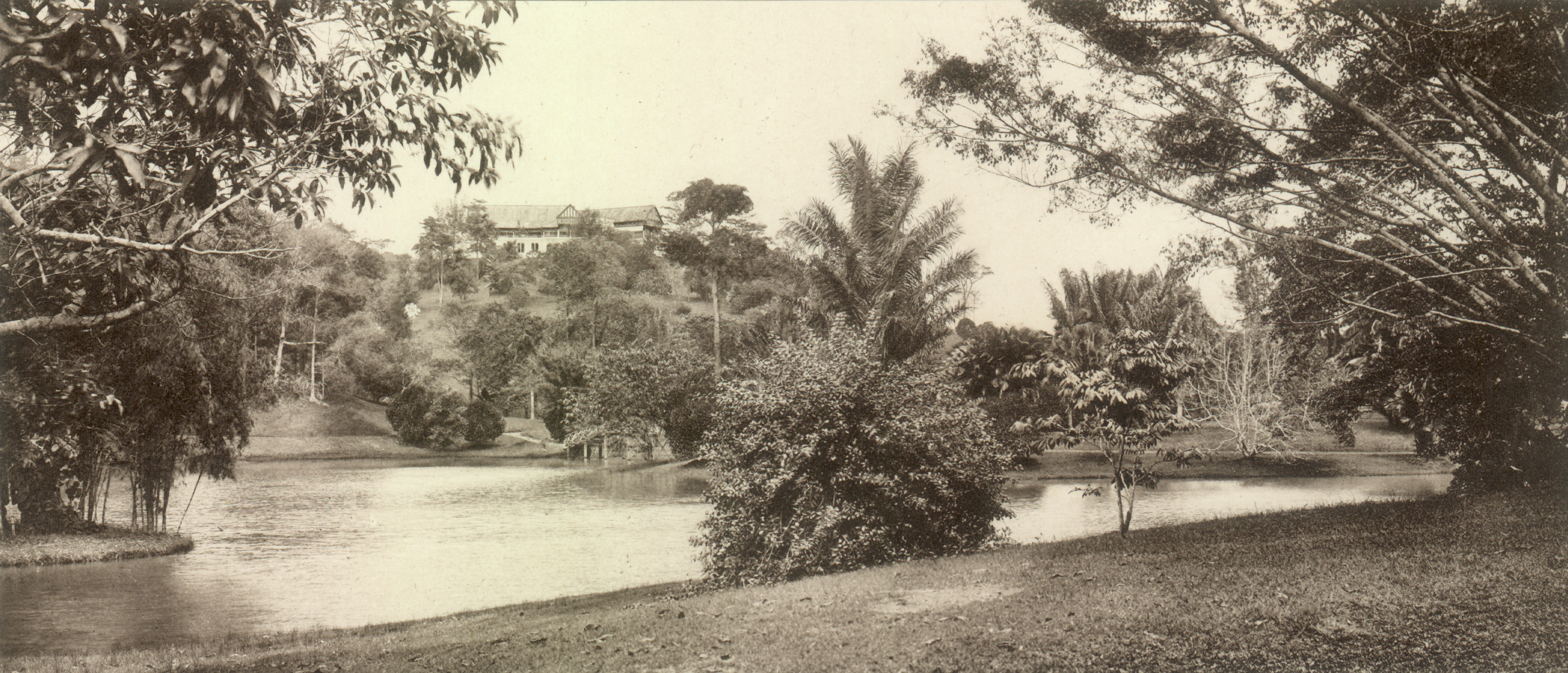
A view of Sydney Lake with the governor's residence Carcosa Seri Negara on a hill in the background, c. 1910.

In the summer of 1877, she was introduced to Frank Swettenham, a rising star in the British colonial civil service, whom she married in February 1878. Sydney was nineteen when she married, and Frank Swettenham was twenty-seven years old. The couple sailed together for Singapore shortly after the wedding.

Sydney Swettenham initially threw herself into the social life of the colony, participating in activities such as tennis tournaments and amateur theatricals, and seems to have enjoyed considerable popularity during the early years of her marriage. However, the combination of the strain of her husband's infidelities and a family predisposition towards mental illness eventually led to the breakdown of the marriage and her commitment to an insane asylum in England. The Swettenhams were finally divorced in 1938 (Frank Swettenham, by that time in his late 80s, remarried shortly thereafter).

Lady Swettenham outlived her husband by a year, dying on 22 November 1947 at Wyke House Lunatic Asylum, Isleworth, Middlesex.

=== Legacy ===
When the first large-scale recreational park in Kuala Lumpur was established in 1888, an artificial lake was created in it and named "Sydney Lake" in her honor. It was later renamed Tasik Perdana.

Malaysian actress and playwright Sabera Shaik wrote a play based on Sydney Swettenham's life entitled Lady Swettenham, which was staged at the Experimental Theatre in Kuala Lumpur in 1995 (as a two-person play with Sabera Shaik and Lina Othman) and again with an expanded cast in Kuala Lumpur in May 2004 (produced by the Masakini Theatre Company). This play attempted to look sympathetically at Sydney Swettenham as a significant character in her own right, albeit a tragic one, and not simply as the wife of a colonial official.
