= 1886 Cypriot legislative election =

Legislative elections were held in Cyprus on 1 November 1886.

== Electoral system ==
The Legislative Council consisted of six official members appointed by the High Commissioner and twelve elected members, three of which were Muslims and nine of which were non-Muslims.

The island was divided into three constituencies, each formed of two districts. Each constituency elected one Muslim and three non-Muslims. Muslim voters had one vote, whilst non-Muslims could vote for up to three candidates. Due to the high levels of illiteracy, voting was not secret, with voters required to tell the polling officers their candidates of choice, which they were required to do in front of the candidates or their agents.

Suffrage was limited to men aged over 21 who had been permanent residents during the five years prior to the election, and had paid either the verghi tax (which was levied as an annual payment of one four-thousandth of a property's value, 4% of rental income or 3% on profits or salaries) or rent for a dwelling or shop within the last year. The number of registered voters for the non-Muslim seats dropped from 16,727 in 1883 to 15,408.

== Campaign ==
=== Muslim ===
Mehemet Ali Fehim and Uzengiji Zade Hussein were the sole Muslim candidates for the Larnaca–Famagusta and Nicosia–Kyrenia constituencies respectively. Both were elected unopposed.

The Limassol–Paphos constituency was contested by more than one Muslim candidate, including Ahmed Rashid.

=== Non-Muslim ===
The Larnaca–Famagusta constituency only had three candidates for the three non-Muslim seats; Sotiris Amfietzis (Mayor of Famagusta and losing candidate in 1883), Ioannis Karemfylakis (a lawyer) and Nikolaos Rossos (another lawyer). They were declared elected on 18 October.

The Limassol–Paphos constituency also only had three non-Muslim candidates; incumbent MLCs Kyprianos Economides, Socrates Fragoudis and Georgios Malikides. They were declared elected on 19 October.

In Nicosia–Kyrenia, there were five non-Muslim candidates; incumbent MLCs Efstathios Constantinides and Paschalis Constantinides, Achillea Liasides (a lawyer who worked with Paschalis Constantinides), Kyrillos Papadopoulos (a priest) and Nikolaos Rossos (who had also run in Larnaca–Famagusta). Rossos attempted to withdraw his candidacy after being elected in Larnaca–Famagusta, but it was too late for him to be removed from the ballot.

== Results ==
=== Muslim seats ===
Constituency	Elected member
Larnaca–Famagusta	Mehmed Naim
Limassol–Paphos	Ahmed Rashid
Nicosia–Kyrenia	Uzengiji Zade Hussein
Source: Cyprus Gazette

=== Non-Muslim seats ===
In Nicosia–Kyrenia, the only contested constituency, voter turnout was just 10%.

Constituency	Candidate	Votes	%	Notes
Larnaca–Famagusta	Sotiris Amfietzis	–	–	Elected unopposed
Larnaca–Famagusta	Ioannis Karemfylakis	–	–	Elected unopposed
Larnaca–Famagusta	Nikolaos Rossos	–	–	Elected unopposed
Limassol–Paphos	Kyprianos Economides	–	–	Re-elected unopposed
Limassol–Paphos	Socrates Fragoudis	–	–	Re-elected unopposed
Limassol–Paphos	Georgios Malikides	–	–	Re-elected unopposed
Nicosia–Kyrenia	Efstathios Constantinides	528	86.9	Re-elected
Nicosia–Kyrenia	Paschalis Constantinides	515	84.8	Re-elected
Nicosia–Kyrenia	Kyrillos Papadopoulos	427	70.3	Elected
Nicosia–Kyrenia	Achillea Liasides	220	36.2	
Nicosia–Kyrenia	Nikolaos Rossos	132	21.7	
Total ballots cast		607		
Registered voters/turnout		5,976	10.2	
Source: Protopapas

== Aftermath ==
Following the elections, defeated Nicosia–Kyrenia candidate Liasides protested that Kyrillos Papadopoulos (who had been elected in third place) was not registered to vote in the constituency, and his election should be annulled. Papadopoulos subsequently resigned voluntarily, and a by-election was scheduled for 22 December. Liasides was the only candidate, and was returned unopposed.

Kyprianos Economides died on 10 December 1886. In the by-election for the vacant seat on 3 January 1887, Dimitrios Nikolaidis (an MLC between 1883 and 1886) defeated the trader Michail Michailidis by 284 to 195 votes. Only 479 of the 3,990 registered voters voted. However, Nikolaidis died in March 1888. Michailidis was subsequently elected in his place on 3 April.

From 1887 onwards there were a spate of resignations and by-elections, several of which had no nominations. Sotiris Amfietzis resigned from the Council in 1887. Richardos Matei, an unsuccessful candidate in the 1883 elections, was the only nominee, and was returned unopposed on 5 September 1887. Socrates Fragoudis also resigned from the Council in June 1889. No nominations were received for the subsequent by-election scheduled for 23 July. A second attempt to hold a by-election in November saw Papadopoulos returned unopposed.

Larnaca–Famagusta representative Ioannis Karemfylakis resigned in July 1889 and there were again no nominations for the by-election.

Richardos Matei and Georgios Malikides both resigned in January 1890. Pericles Vontitsianos was elected unopposed to replace Matei on 15 February, whilst Aristotle Paleologos was returned unopposed as Malikides' replacement on 25 February.

A by-election was eventually held for the vacant seat in Larnaca–Famagusta on 16 October 1890, with Richardos Matei defeating Loukas Paisiou by 183 votes to 144.
