= Arthur Young (colonial administrator) =

Colonial Administrator

Sir Arthur Henderson Young GCMG KBE KCMG CMG
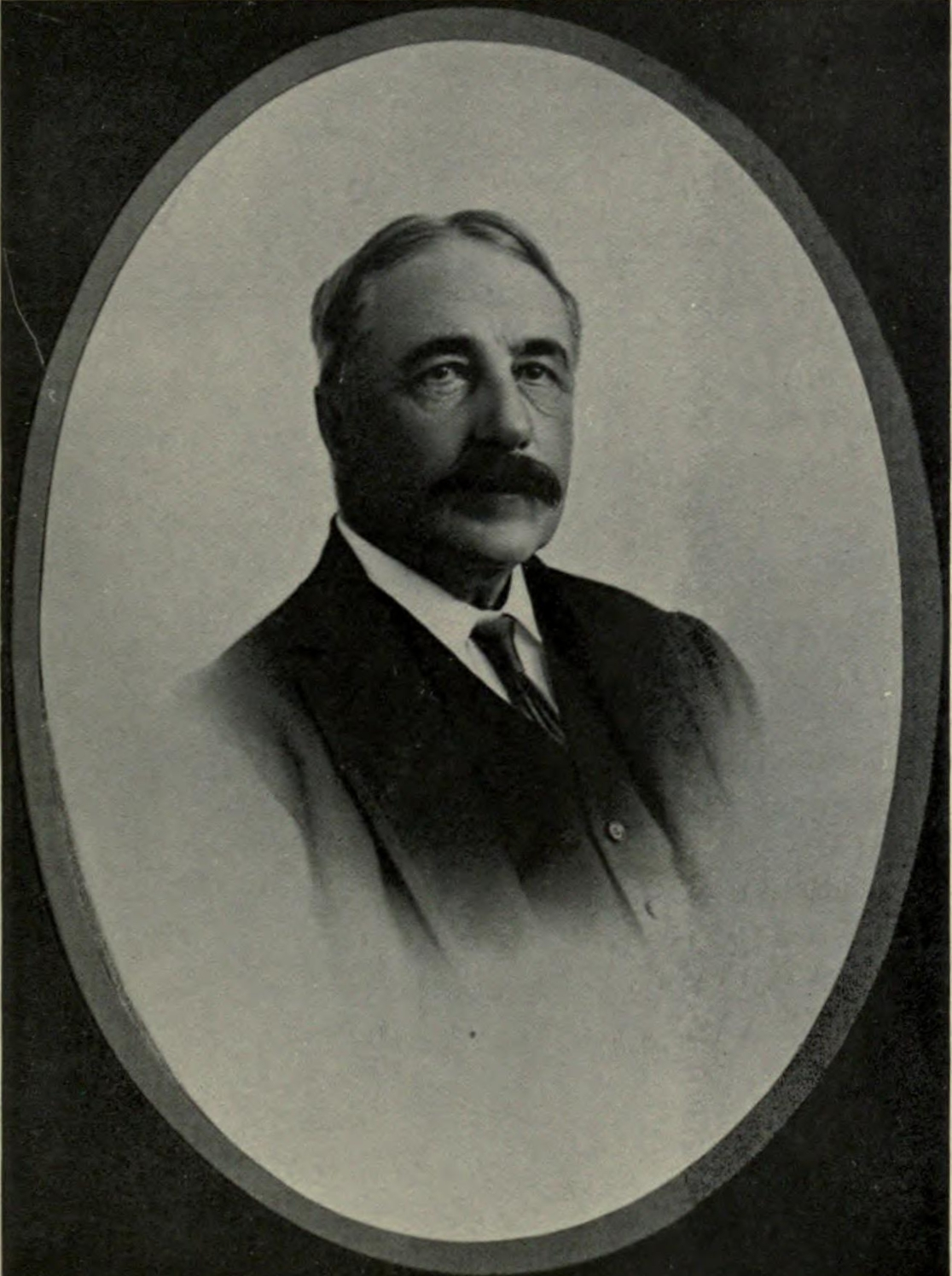
- Arthur Henderson Young as Governor of the Straits Settlements

17th Governor of the Straits Settlements
- In office 2 September 1911 – 17 February 1920
- Monarch: George V
- Preceded by: Sir John Anderson
- Succeeded by: Sir Laurence Guillemard

High Commissioner for the Federated Malay States
- In office 9 September 1911 – 24 August 1920
- Preceded by: Sir John Anderson
- Succeeded by: Sir Laurence Guillemard

Resident-General of Federated Malay States
- In office 1 February 1911 – 4 September 1911
- Preceded by: William Thomas Taylor
- Succeeded by: Edward Lewis Brockman (as Chief Secretary to the Government of the FMS)

10th Colonial Secretary of Straits Settlements
- In office 29 June 1906 – 31 January 1911
- Preceded by: Frederick George Penney
- Succeeded by: Edward Lewis Brockman

Personal details
- Born: 31 October 1854
- Died: 20 October 1938 (aged 83)
- Spouse: Lady Evelyn Anne Kennedy (m. 1885; died 1936)
- Parent: Colonel Keith Young (father)
- Profession: Colonial Administrator

Captain Sir Arthur Henderson Young GCMG KBE (31 October 1854 – 20 October 1938) was a British colonial administrator.

== Family ==
He was the son of Colonel Keith Young.

On 5 November 1885, he married Lady Evelyn Anne Kennedy, a daughter of Archibald Kennedy, 2nd Marquess of Ailsa, and Julia Jephson.

== Education ==
Young was educated at Edinburgh Academy and the Royal Military College, Sandhurst.

== Career ==
Young joined the 27th Inniskillings as a sub-lieutenant, and entered the Colonial Service in 1878. He was first appointed to command a Military Police unit in Cyprus. The next 27 years he spent in the colony, holding successively the positions of Assistant Commissioner at Paphos, later Commissioner at Paphos, Commissioner at Famagusta, then Director of Survey and Forest Officer and Chief Secretary to the Government of Cyprus. In 1883 he contested the first elections to the new Legislative Council, but finished last in the Larnaca–Famagusta constituency with only 43 votes of the 6,899 cast. Young ran again in the 1891 elections; on this occasion his candidacy aroused significant controversy, and was opposed by both Greek Cypriots and the High Commissioner. Although he failed to be elected, he successfully appealed to the Supreme Court to have the election results partially annulled on the basis of intimidation and corruption due to attempts by the priesthood to dissuade people from voting for him. However, he did not contest the subsequent by-election for the vacant seats.

For six months in 1895, and for lesser periods in 1898, 1900, and 1904, Young administered the Government of Cyprus. In 1902, he went on a special mission to St. Vincent in the West Indies. He was posted as the Colonial Secretary of the Straits Settlements on 29 June 1906 until 1911. He became the British High Commissioner in Malaya and Governor of the Straits Settlements from 1911 to 1920.

== Honours ==
In 1897, Young was appointed Companion of the Order of St Michael and St George (CMG) and Knight Commander of the Order of St Michael and St George (KCMG) in November 1908.

In 1916, Young was appointed Knight Grand Cross of the Order of St Michael and St George (GCMG) and Knight Commander of the Order of the British Empire (KBE) in 1918.

- United Kingdom :
  - Knight Commander of the Order of the British Empire (KBE) – Sir (1918)
  - Knight Grand Cross of the Order of St Michael and St George (GCMG) – Sir (1916)
  - Knight Commander of the Order of St Michael and St George (KCMG) – Sir (1908)
  - Companion of the Order of St Michael and St George (CMG) (1897)

== See also ==
- FMS KL No 3663/1917 From E L Brockman to Chung Thye Phin on Appointment to Federal Council
- Appointment of Chung Thye Phin to the Federal Council of the FMS by Arthur Henderson Young
