= Mathew Swetenham =

Matthew Swettenham (died 29 December 1416) was Henry IV's bowbearer. He is commemorated by a brass effigy at St. Mary's Church in Blakesley.

== Life ==
Mathew Swetenham first appears in the historical records when Richard II 'granted him 6 pence a day being retained as Saggitarius dei Corona (Archer of the Crown)'. In 1390, he was appointed Yeoman of the Chamber. After Richard II was deposed in 1399, Swetenham transferred his allegiance to Henry IV who granted him £30 per year from properties in Northamptonshire. In 1405, he was made Yeoman of the King's Chamber, armour bearer and High Sheriff of Northamptonshire. Following Henry IV's death in 1413, Swetenham continued to serve under Henry V.

The town of Swettenham in Cheshire was named after Mathew Swetenham, whose descendants continued to live there for some 350 years. The Swettenham's country house was Somerford Booths Hall.

Mathew Swetenham was an ancestor of the British colonial administrator Sir Frank Swettenham.
