= Frederick Mitchell Hodgson =

British colonial administrator (1851–1925)

Sir Frederick Mitchell Hodgson KCMG

Governor of Gold Coast
- In office 29 May 1898 – 29 August 1900
- Monarch: Victoria
- Preceded by: William Edward Maxwell
- Succeeded by: Matthew Nathan

Governor of Barbados
- In office November 1900 – 1904
- Preceded by: James Shaw Hay
- Succeeded by: Gilbert Thomas Carter

Governor of British Guiana
- In office 26 September 1904 – 5 July 1912
- Monarchs: Edward VII; George V
- Preceded by: James Alexander Swettenham
- Succeeded by: Walter Egerton

Personal details
- Born: 1851
- Died: 6 August 1925 (aged 73–74)

Sir Frederick Mitchell Hodgson, KCMG, VD (1851 – 6 August 1925) was a British colonial administrator who was Governor of the Gold Coast (1898–1900), Barbados (1900–04) and British Guiana (1904–11).

== Early years ==
Hodgson was the son of the Reverend Octavius Arthur Hodgson, Rector of East Stoke, Dorset, England. He joined the General Post Office, and worked in the Savings Bank department between 1868 and 1869. He was Postmaster General of British Guiana from 1884 to 1888.

== Gold Coast ==
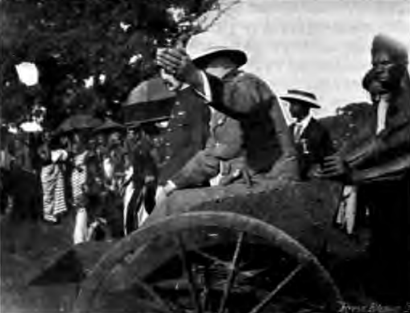
Hodgeson pictured in Kumasi (1900)

Hodgson was appointed Colonial Secretary of Gold Coast from 1888 to 1898. In 1892, he raised the Gold Coast Rifle Volunteers, and was Major commanding this force. Hodgson was Governor and Commander-in-Chief of Gold Coast from 1898 to 1900. He was appointed KCMG on 3 June 1899.

The 1896 British expedition against the Ashanti led by Sir Francis Scott had entered Kumasi and forced King Prempeh to submit, with all his treasures being seized except the Golden Stool of Ashanti, which had been hidden. The Golden Stool was said to be an immense throne of solid gold. When the Asante demanded more political autonomy and the return of Prempeh, who had been banished, Hodgson justified British rule on the grounds that autonomy would lead to a return to the traffic in slaves.

In 1899 Hodgson sent his private secretary, Captain Armitage, on a secret expedition to find the Golden Stool. The expedition succeeded only in arousing the suspicions of the Asante. Hodgson summoned the Asante chiefs to an assembly at Kumasi held on 28 March 1900. He asked them: "What must I do to the man, whoever he is, who has failed to give to the Queen, who is the paramount power in the country, the stool to which she is entitled? Where is the Golden Stool? Why am I not sitting on the Golden Stool at this moment? I am the representative of the paramount power in this country; why have you relegated me to this chair? Why did you not take the opportunity of my coming to Kumasi to bring the Golden Stool and give it to me to sit upon?" The chiefs listened in silence, then went home to prepare for war.

Hodgson found himself besieged in the fort at Kumasi. The fort was impregnable to Asante weapons, and defended by machine guns and artillery in the fort's turrets. On 15 May, a force of 170 African soldiers and three British officers reached the fort after marching 238 miles from the north, bringing food and ammunition. A relief expedition was dispatched from the coast, but moved slowly. The Asante constructed massive barricades of logs, dirt and stones across the roads, strong enough to be impervious to artillery fire, with fortified and entrenched flanks. After help had finally arrived, Hodgson managed to break out and reached Cape Coast Castle by July 1900, leaving a small garrison behind. Some people died in the escape. His wife, Lady Mary Alice Hodgson, née Young, who was the first English lady to visit Ashanti, wrote The Siege of Kumassi an account of the siege and of the subsequent march to the coast.

Sir Frederick was appointed Governor of Barbados, succeeded by Major Matthew Nathan. On 26 September 1901, the Ashanti kingdom was formally annexed by Britain. Queen Yaa Asantewaa's forces were defeated on 30 September and she was captured soon after. Future British administrators were more tactful than Hodgson, and eventually Prempeh was restored to his throne and sat once again on the Golden Stool.

== Later career ==
Hodgson was Governor and Commander-in-Chief of Barbados from late 1900 to 1904 . He was Governor of British Guiana from 1904 to 1911. In August 1904 Hodgson had to deal with an incident in which the Venezuelan authorities had arrested some miners who they claimed had strayed across the border from Guiana. The men were released, but Hodgson made it clear that his government would not in future assist miners who violated Venezuelan laws.

In 1905, Hodgson intervened with sugar plantation owners in Guiana, persuading them to reverse wage increases. He was concerned that such increases would cause "trouble" throughout the colonial sugar industry. At the end of November 1905 dock workers in Georgetown went on strike for higher wages, and began rioting and looting stores. On 1 December, Hodgson met with members of the Georgetown City Council who had agreed to represent the strikers. He addressed a large crowd, promising to investigate their grievances if they would disperse. The rioters refused, and over the next three days disturbances continued. Two warships arrived on 4 December with a contingent of soldiers who restored calm. In the aftermath several hundred people were arrested and charged, with some being flogged and others spending time in jail. No wage increase was granted.

Hodgson caused some controversy in April 1908 when he invited Sir Joseph Godfrey, the District Grand Master of the Masonic Lodge, Surgeon General, and a leading member of the Executive Council, to lay the foundation stone of the new Carnegie Library building in Georgetown. The Roman Catholics strongly objected, but the governor went ahead. On 23 December 1911 Hodgson was appointed an officer of the new masonic lodge called the Royal Colonial Institute.

In June 1910, Hodgson ordered that the small island of Kyk-Over-Al, at the junction of the Mazaruni and Cuyuni Rivers, be cleared of its overgrowth. This revealed the remains of a Dutch fort from the late 16th century, including stone ramparts and brick pavements and relics such as bottles and clay pipes. The modern relevance was that it established the British claim to the island as successors to the Dutch.

Hodgson died in London, England, aged 73, in 1925.

== Sources ==
- Adams, Iestyn (2005). Brothers across the ocean: British foreign policy and the origins of the Anglo-American 'special relationship' 1900-1905. I. B.Tauris. ISBN 1-85043-708-4.
- Beharry, Inderjeet (November 2005). "Short History of the development of English Freemasonry in Guyana 1780–2004". Proceedings of the Heritage Lodge. Archived from the original on 2 April 2012.
- Desai, Gaurav Gajanan (2001). Subject to colonialism: African self-fashioning and the colonial library. Duke University Press. ISBN 0-8223-2641-8.
- Edgerton, Robert B. (2002). The Fall of the Asante Empire: The Hundred-Year War For Africa's Gold Coast. Simon and Schuster. ISBN 0-7432-3638-6.
- "Fort Kyk Over Al". Guyana Chronicle. 5 May 2002. Archived from the original on 28 March 2012.
- Ishmael, Odeen (2005). "The 1905 Riots". The Guyana Story (From Earliest Times to Independence).
- Knight, Ian (1989). Queen Victoria's Enemies: Northern Africa. Osprey Publishing. ISBN 0-85045-937-0.
- Latimer, Elizabeth (1900). The Last Years of the Nineteenth Century. Forgotten Books. ISBN 1-4510-1456-2.
- Lewis, Gordon K. (2004). The Growth of the Modern West Indies. Ian Randle Publishers. ISBN 976-637-171-7.
- Morgan, Henry James, ed. (1903). Types of Canadian Women and of Women who are or have been Connected with Canada. Toronto: Williams Briggs.
- "New Freemasonry Lodge". Evening Post. LXXXII (151). 23 December 1911.
- Ramseyer, Friedrich August; Kühne, Johannes; Weitbrecht, Mary; Gundert, Hermann; Christlieb, Theodor (1875). Four Years in Ashantee. J. Nisbet & Co. p. 321.
- Sanderson, Edgar (2001). Great Britain in Africa: The History of Colonial Expansion. Simon Publications LLC. ISBN 1-931541-31-0.
