= Leontios of Cyprus =

Archbishop of Cyprus in 1947

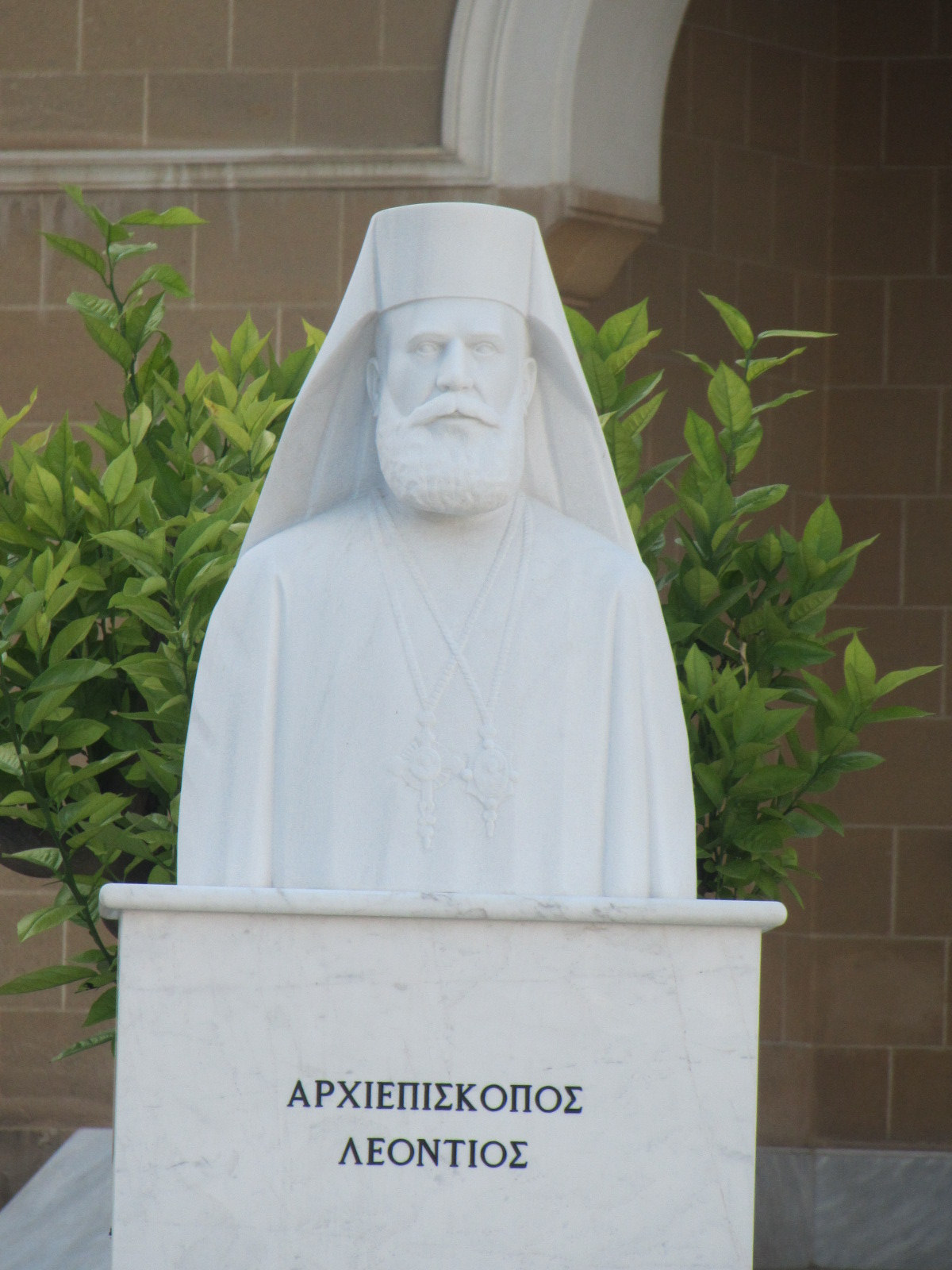
Leontios Leondios, Archbishop of Cyprus

Leontios (secular name Antonios Leontiou, Greek: Aντώνιος Λεοντίου; 3 March 1896 – 26 July 1947) was Archbishop of Cyprus for only 36 days in 1947. He was born in Limassol, British Cyprus.

== Biography ==
He was educated in theological studies at the University of Athens and Columbia University in New York.

Prior to his election as archbishop of Cyprus, he served as bishop of Paphos district.

He headed the Cypriot delegation which came to London in December 1946 to discuss enosis (union with Greece).

He was elected archbishop on 20 June 1947.

The Archbishop died of typhus following a long period of diabetes, and consequently it was not possible for the body to lie in state for several days for public homage, as is customary. The funeral took place on 27 July 1947 at the Greek cemetery at Nicosia.

Religious titles
Preceded by Kyrillos III	Archbishop of Cyprus; 1947	Succeeded by Makarios II
