= Kyrillos II of Cyprus =

Archbishop of Cyprus from 1909 to 1916

His Beatitude Kyrillos Papadopoulos
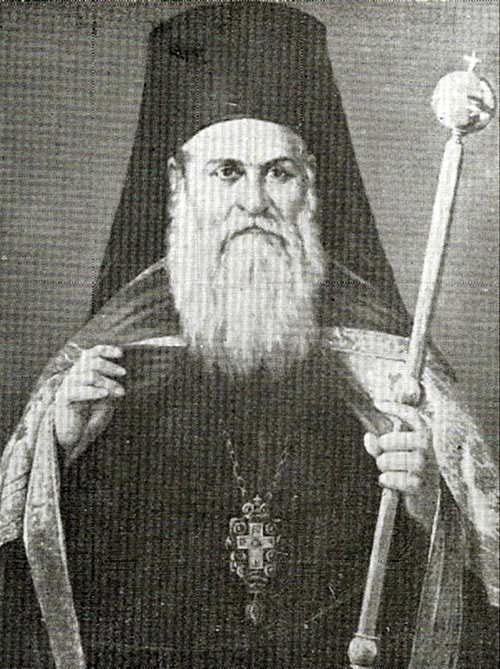

Archbishop of Cyprus
- In office 1909–1916
- Preceded by: Sophronios III
- Succeeded by: Kyrillos III

Member of the Legislative Council
- In office 1889–1916
- Preceded by: Socrates Fragoudis
- Constituency: Nicosia–Kyrenia

Personal details
- Born: 26 October 1845 Prodromos, Ottoman Empire
- Died: 6 July 1916 (aged 70) Agios Dimitrios Marathasas, Limassol, Cyprus

Kyrillos II Papadopoulos (Greek: Κύριλλος Παπαδόπουλος, 26 October 1845 – 6 July 1916), nicknamed Kyrillatsos ("Big Kyrillos"), was a Cypriot bishop and politician. He held the positions of Bishop of Larnaca and Archbishop of Cyprus (1909–1916), and was also a member of the Legislative Council.

== Biography ==
Papadopoulos was born in Prodromos in Limassol District during the Ottoman Era. He studied in Jerusalem at the Theological School of the Holy Cross between 1866 and 1872. He then worked as a teacher at the Greek School in Nicosia.

In 1886 he contested elections to the Legislative Council in the Nicosia–Kyrenia constituency. Although he received enough votes to be elected, one of the losing candidates protested that Papadopoulos was not registered to vote in the constituency, and he voluntarily resigned. However, he was later elected to the Council in a by-election in 1889. He retained his seat until 1911, winning re-election in 1891, 1896, 1901 and 1906.

He was a Committee member of Paphos District (1888–89) and then was elected Metropolitan of Kyrenia in 1889. As a metropolitan of Kyrenia, he made significant efforts to persuade the Linobabakoi (Christians who had converted to Islam) to rejoin the church.

After the death of the Metropolitan of Kitium (Larnaca), he was elected metropolitan of that metropolis. During his authority under that metropolis, the first Greek flag in Cyprus was raised in the Trooditissa Monastery on 6 September 1902. He was a founder of the Pancyprian Gymnasium (High School).

After the death of Sophronius III, he was elected Archbishop of Cyprus in 1909.

He was considered a staunch supporter of enosis. His successor Kyrillos III was more amenable to the British presence. Their antagonism flared after the British Crown Commissioner, Sir Charles Harman, passed a law regulating the election of the Archbishop, in 1907. The disagreement between the two Cypriot prelates eventually involved the Eastern Orthodox Patriarchates of Constantinople, Jerusalem and Alexandria. The two religious leaders were finally re-concilled following the intervention of the Greek government, in February 1910.

After he gave up as Archbishop he became president of the Greek Educational Institutions in Cyprus, a post he held until his death in 1916.

In March 2010 his grave was vandalised.
