= Makarios II of Cyprus =

Archbishop of Cyprus from 1947 to 1950

Makarios II (Greek: Μακάριος Β΄; born Michail Charalambous Papaioannou [Μιχαήλ Χαραλάμπους Παπαϊωάννου]; 1870 – 28 June 1950) was the Archbishop of Cyprus from 1947 until 1950.

== Biography ==
Michail Charalambous Papaioannou was born in a Greek Cypriot family in the village of Prodromos, Ottoman Cyprus, in 1870.

In 1895, he was ordained a deacon and left Cyprus for further education. He studied at the Great School of the Nation in Constantinople before entering the Halki seminary.

In 1912, he enlisted in the Hellenic Army and served as chaplain during the Balkan Wars. On 20 March 1917, he was elected Bishop of Kyrenia.

After the disturbances of October 1931, Makarios was exiled by the British administration. He remained in Pangrati, Athens during World War II and returned to Cyprus on 22 December 1946.

Makarios II was elected Archbishop of Cyprus, without an opponent after the death of the Bishop of Kitium, on 24 December 1947. He died on 28 June 1950 and was succeeded by Makarios III.

== Relationship with Enosis ==
On 6 March 1950, shortly before the Israeli consulate opened in Nicosia, Makarios II sent a letter to the office of Israeli Prime Minister David Ben-Gurion, dated 10 February 1950, describing the support of the Greek Cypriot population in unification with the Kingdom of Greece (enosis). The same letter was sent to other heads of states to encourage support for Cypriot independence from Great Britain. The letter was the first Greek Cypriot document entered into the Israel State Archives.

Religious titles
Preceded by Leontios	Archbishop of Cyprus; 1947– 1950	Succeeded by Makarios III
