= Zaman (Cyprus) =

Zaman (Turkish for "time") was the first Turkish Cypriot newspaper.

The first edition appeared on 25 December 1891, when to publication of an Ottoman harvest hall. Although the merchant Hacy Dervis Efendi was named as an official dealer, the Osmanische harvest hall was the actual owner.

In the beginning time came out next to the actual Zaman, yet seven further periodicals in different languages:

- The Times of Cyprus: weekly edition, in English
- The Owl: weekly edition, in English. Kypros: weekly edition, in Modern Greek
- Foni tis Kyprou: weekly edition, in Modern Greek
- Salpinks: weekly edition, in Modern Greek
- ENOSIS: weekly edition, in Modern Greek
- Evagoras: weekly edition, in Modern Greek
