= John Anderson (colonial administrator) =

Scottish colonial administrator (1858–1918)

His Excellency Sir John Anderson GCMG KCB JP
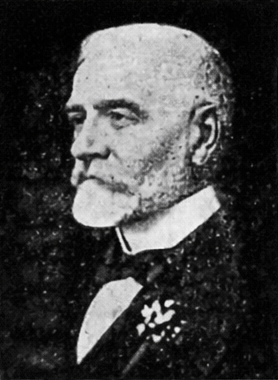

16th Governor of the Straits Settlements
- In office 15 April 1904 – 9 April 1911
- Monarchs: Edward VII; George V
- Preceded by: Frank Swettenham
- Succeeded by: Arthur Young

22nd Governor of British Ceylon
- In office 15 April 1916 – 24 March 1918
- Preceded by: Edward Stubbs (acting)
- Succeeded by: Edward Stubbs (acting)

Personal details
- Born: 23 June 1858 Gartly, Aberdeenshire, Scotland
- Died: 24 March 1918 (aged 60) Colombo, Ceylon
- Education: University of Aberdeen

Sir John Anderson, GCMG, KCB, JP (23 June 1858 – 24 March 1918) was a Scottish colonial administrator who served as Governor of the Straits Settlements between 1904 and 1911 and Governor of Ceylon between 1916 and 1918. He was the first Governor of Ceylon to die in office.

== Education ==
He was the only son of John Anderson, the Superintendent of the Gordon Mission, Aberdeen. Before he was twenty, he graduated MA at Aberdeen University, gaining a first class in mathematics and being awarded the gold medal of the year.

== Career ==
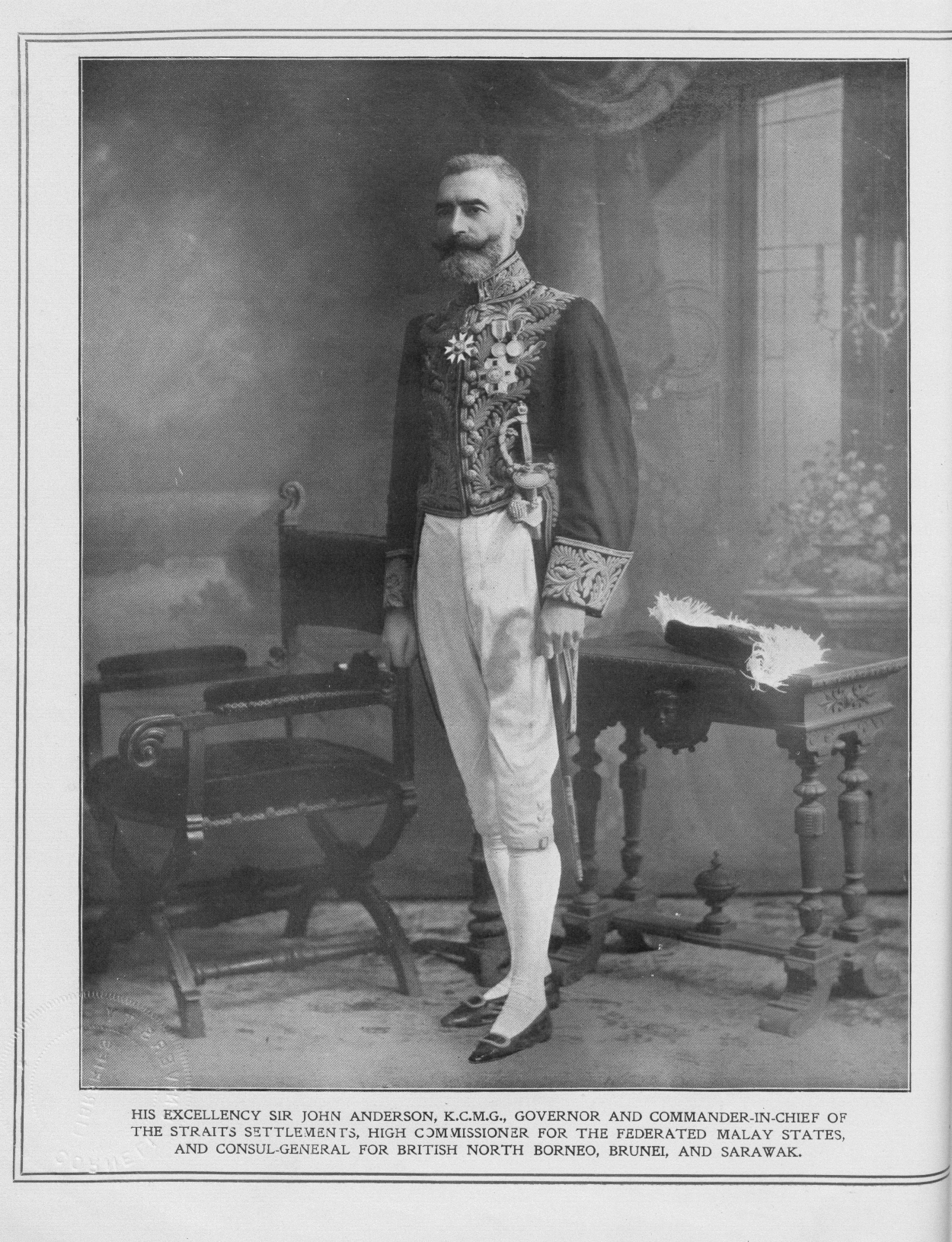
Sir John Anderson as the Governor of Straits Settlements

Two years after graduating, he entered the Colonial Office as a second class clerk. In 1887, he was Bacon Scholar of Gray's Inn, and in the following year, he was the Inns of Court student.

He proceeded with Sir John Frederick Dickson in 1891 to Gibraltar, in order to inquire into the matters connected with the Registry of the Supreme Court. He was next appointed as the private secretary to Sir Robert Meade, Permanent Under-Secretary of the State for the Colonies, in 1892 he served as the British Agent for Bering Sea Arbitration.

From 1883 to 1897 he edited the Colonial Office List, later he appointed as the principal clerk. He became the secretary to the Conference between Joseph Chamberlain and the Colonial Premiers in that year he had considerable opportunities of gaining an intimate knowledge of the feelings of the self-governing colonies. For the second time, he was despatched to Gibraltar in 1899, on this occasion to inquire into the rates of pay of the Civil Service there. He returned to London in the same year and remained until 1901, where Chamberlain chose him as Colonial Office representative to accompany T.R.H. the Prince and Princess of Wales, then the Duke and Duchess of York, on their famous tour around British Empire on board HMS Ophir. It was during that trip that Sir John saw for the first time the colony over which he would preside.

In 1902, again he acted as the secretary to the Colonial Conference, and in 1903, he received thanks of the Canadian Government and the Confederation medal for services rendered in connection with the Alaska Boundary question and other matters.

In 1904, he was appointed as Governor of Straits Settlements where he served till 1911. In 1916, he was appointed as Governor of British Ceylon. In Ceylon, he played a major role in settling many problems and riots that started in 1915 and suppressed harshly by the British.

He suddenly fell ill at Queens Cottage, Nuwara Eliya in 1918 and died on 24 March 1918. It is recorded that his Maha Mudaliyar, Sir Solomon Dias Bandaranaike, who happened to be at his bedside, wrote:

Sir John was the first Governor of this country to die while his term of office in Sri Lanka and was as yet unfinished, and every circumstance combined to make his death a matter of genuine and universal grief so that it seemed almost a personal loss. May our people of Lanka take an example from this Great and Good man!

== Honours ==
He was appointed as a Companion of the Order of St Michael and St George (CMG) in 1898, and a Knight Commander of the Order of St Michael and St George (KCMG) in 1901 when he was due to accompany the Duke and Duchess of York. In 1906, he was awarded LL.D. from his former alma mater.

== Legacy ==
Anderson School (Sekohlah Menengah Kebangsaan Anderson) in Ipoh, Malaysia was named after the then High Commissioner of the Malay States, Sir John Anderson, the school was formally opened on 6 February 1909.

In Singapore, Anderson Bridge and Anderson Road were named after him. The latter gave its name to Anderson Secondary School, which was originally located there.

Government offices
Preceded by Sir Frank Athelstane Swettenham	Governor of Straits Settlements; 1904–1911	Succeeded by Sir Arthur Henderson Young
Preceded by Sir Francis Hopwood	Permanent Under-Secretary of State for the Colonies; 1911–1916	Succeeded by Sir George Fiddes
Preceded by Reginald Edward Stubbs acting governor	Governor of British Ceylon; 1916–1918	Succeeded by Reginald Edward Stubbs acting governor
