= James Westland (civil servant) =

Sir James Westland KCSI (4 November 1842 – 9 May 1903) was a British financier and colonial administrator.

== Biography ==
Westland was born in Dundee, the son of James Westland and Agnes Monro. He was educated at Marischal College and gained a place at the Royal Military Academy Woolwich in January 1861, but left the army in July of that year. He subsequently won the entrance exam into the Indian Civil Service.

Initially serving as an assistant magistrate and collector in various Bengal districts, Westland was appointed accountant and comptroller-general to the government of India in July 1878. After a brief time in the Egyptian accounts department in 1885, he was a member of Sir Charles Elliott's Indian expenditure commission in February 1886, acted as secretary of the financial department from September 1886, and was temporary finance member of government from August 1887 to November 1888. Westland was made Companion of the Order of the Star of India in 1888. He served briefly as Chief Commissioner of Assam between July and October 1889, but had to resign on the grounds of poor health.

In November 1893 he became the Finance member of the Viceroy's Executive Council, and he was made a Knight Commander of the Order of the Star of India in the 1895 New Year Honours. He left India in 1899, at which point he was nominated to the India Council based in Whitehall.

On 23 April 1874 Westland married Janet Mildred Jackson. He died in 1903 and was survived by two sons and two daughters.

Government offices
| Preceded by Sir Dennis Fitzpatrick | Chief Commissioner of Assam; 1889 | Succeeded by James Wallace Quinton |
