= St. Panteleimon Monastery, Myrtou =

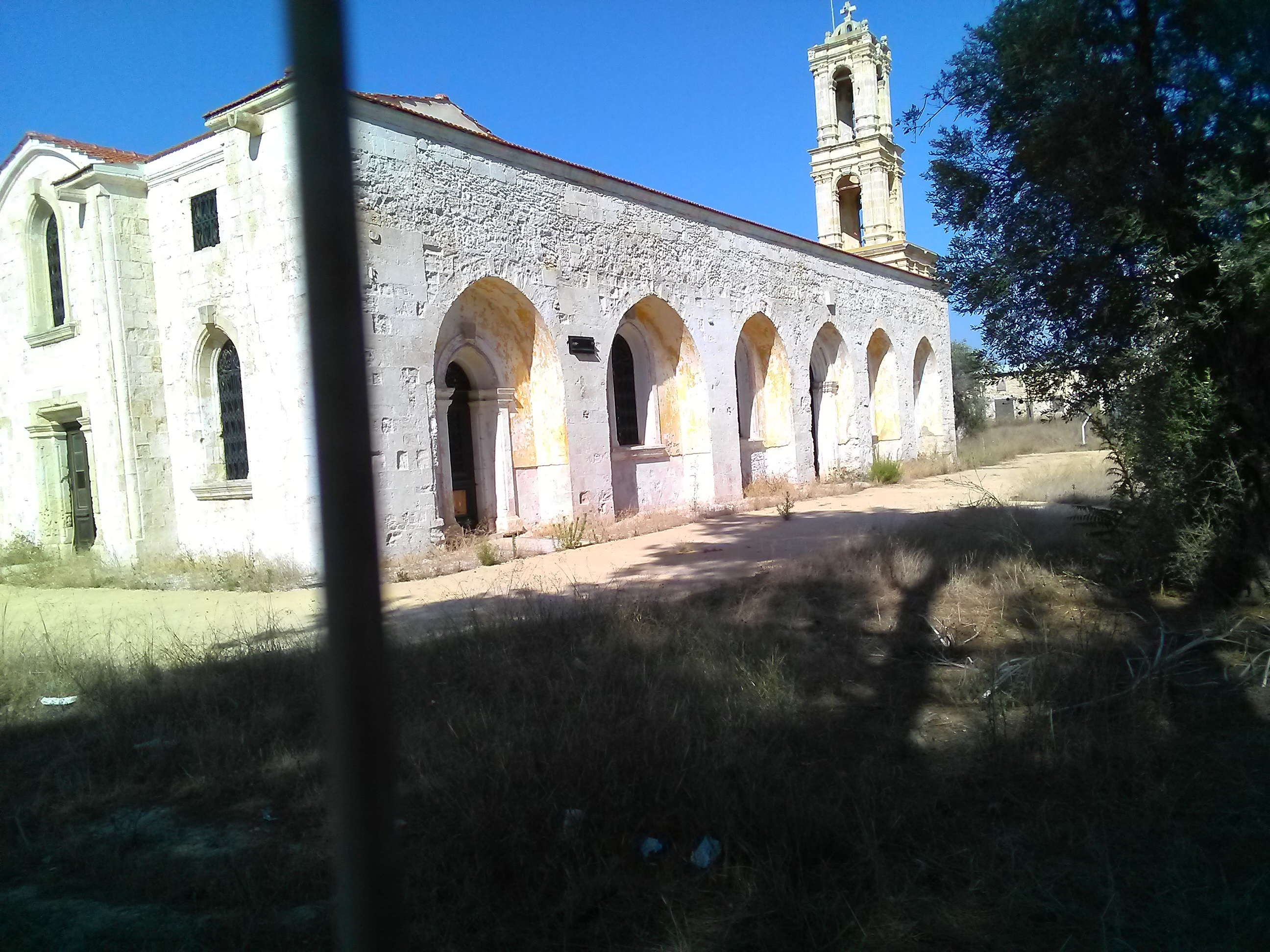
Monastery of St. Panteleimon, about 100 yards east of the centre of Myrtou

St. Panteleimon Monastery in Myrtou (Greek: Μοναστήρι Αγίου Παντελεήμονα στη Μύρτου (Aghios Panteleimon (Myrtou)), Turkish: Panteleemon Manastırı, Çamlıbel) is a former Eastern Orthodox monastery in Cyprus .

== History ==
The monastery was founded by several monks in the 11th century. A reconstruction of the monastery was carried out in the 16th and 17th centuries.

St. Panteleimon is celebrated on 27 July.

Before the Turkish invasion of Cyprus in 1974, many people from all over Cyprus were visiting the monastery to pay their respects to St. Panteleimon as well as people from abroad. Since the invasion, the monastery of Saint Panteleimon remains empty.

== Monastic building ==
The west side of the central church building and outbuildings on the north side of the compound

The monastery complex is made up of buildings of various dates and includes a section used as a guest house. In the 19th and 20th centuries the resident monastic population was around 10-20.

A main entrance was constructed in the late 19th century. The church has Renaissance features but has been much altered. Around 17th-18th centuries the original nave was demolished and rebuilt with a remarkable covered exterior corridor (loggia) of pointed arches and vaulting (south side).

Between the nave and the loggia is the chapel of St. Panteleimon, which is of ancient date. It has a barrel vault style. It is separated from the nave by semi-circular arches sitting on short columns. This old part of the church has a number of doors and windows that open up to the exterior corridor.

The inside of the church had an Iconostasis (wall of icons and religious paintings separating the nave from the sanctuary) which included portions of an older medieval screen. The part of the iconostasis across the chapel of St. Panteleimon had elaborate wood carving, much added recently. Many icons were of superior quality, possibly medieval.

The chapel of St. Panteleimon is separated from the rest by an unusual elegant iron screen. This unusual feature gives much interest to the interior.

The United Nations Development Programme (UNDP), the (bi-communal) Technical Committee on Cultural Heritage in Cyprus, and the European Union started conservation works to St. Panteleimon monastery on 9 October 2015.
