= Charles Mitchell (colonial administrator) =

Colonial Administrator

Sir Charles Mitchell GCMG
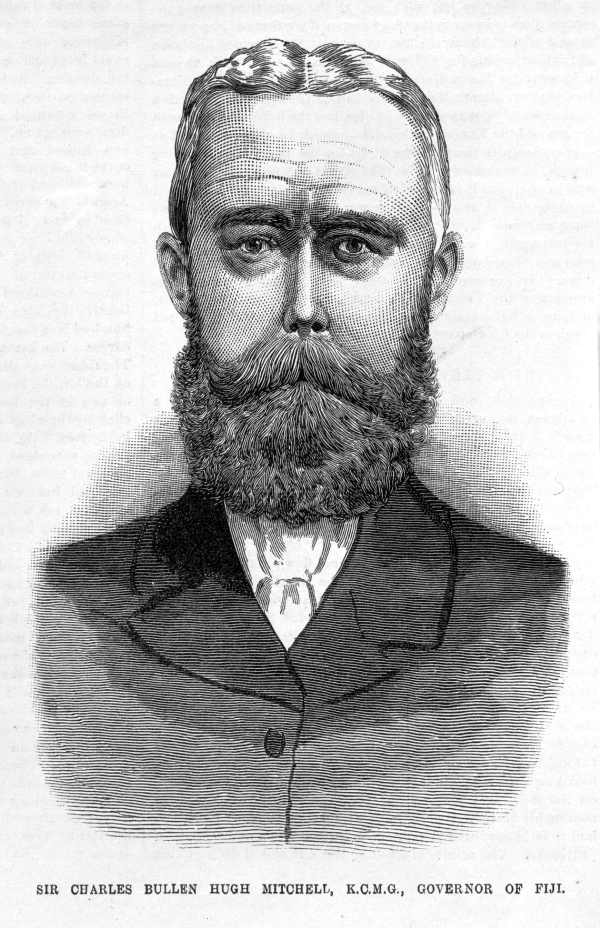
- Charles Mitchell

14th Governor of the Straits Settlements
- In office 1 February 1894 – 7 December 1899
- Monarch: Victoria
- Preceded by: William Edward Maxwell
- Succeeded by: Sir James Alexander Swettenham (acting)

7th Governor of Natal
- In office December 1889 – July 1893
- Monarch: Victoria
- Preceded by: Sir Arthur Havelock
- Succeeded by: Francis Haden (acting)

Acting Governor of the Leeward Islands
- In office 1888–1888
- Monarch: Victoria
- Preceded by: Jenico Preston, 14th Viscount Gormanston
- Succeeded by: Sir William Smith

4th Governor of Fiji
- In office January 1887 – February 1888
- Monarch: Victoria
- Preceded by: Sir John Bates Thurston (acting)
- Succeeded by: Sir John Thurston

3rd High Commissioner for the Western Pacific
- In office January 1887 – February 1888
- Monarch: Victoria
- Preceded by: Sir John Bates Thurston (acting)
- Succeeded by: Sir John Thurston

Acting Governor of Natal
- In office 22 December 1881 – 6 March 1882
- Monarch: Victoria
- Preceded by: Redvers Buller
- Succeeded by: Sir Henry Bulwer

Personal details
- Born: 1836 London, England, United Kingdom
- Died: 7 December 1899 (aged 62–63) Singapore
- Resting place: St. Andrew's Cathedral, Singapore
- Citizenship: British
- Spouse(s): Fanny Rice (d.1885); Eliza Weldon,
- Children: Hugh Mitchell
- Profession: Colonial Administrator, Royal Marines officer

Military service
- Allegiance: United Kingdom of Great Britain and Ireland
- Branch/service: Royal Marines
- Years of service: 1852–1878
- Rank: Lieutenant Colonel

Sir Charles Bullen Hugh Mitchell GCMG (1836 – 7 December 1899) was a British Royal Marines officer and colonial administrator. As the latter, he served in British Honduras, British Guiana, Natal. He then served as Governor of Fiji, of the British Colony of Natal & Zululand, and of the Straits Settlements.

== Career ==
=== Military ===
Mitchell attended the Royal Naval School and joined the Royal Marines in 1852. He served with them in the Baltic campaigns from 1854 to 1856. He retired from the marines in 1878 as a lieutenant-colonel.

=== Civil career ===
Mitchell begin his colonial career as Colonial Secretary of British Honduras in July 1868. He also administrated the Government in 1870, 1874 and 1876.

Mitchell was the Receiver General in British Guiana in 1877 and followed by Colonial Secretary of Natal in November 1877. He was the Acting Governor of Natal in 1881, 1882 and 1885–1886.

Mitchell was the Governor of Fiji between 1887 and 1888.

Mitchell administered the Government of Natal and Zululand in 1889 and was eventually appointed as the Governor in the October of the same year.

Mitchell was the Governor of the Straits Settlement between 1894 and 1899.

== Personal life ==
Mitchell's first wife Fanny Rice died in 1885. He remarried to Eliza Weldon. He had a son, Colonel Hugh Mitchell of the Royal Marines.

Mitchell died on 7 December 1899, while in office as Governor of the Straits Settlements. He was buried in St Andrew's Cathedral, Singapore, his tombstone was erected "To the glory of God and in memory of His Excellency Lieutenant Colonel Sir Charles Bullen Hugh Mitchell Royal Marine Light Infantry, G.C.M.G. Governor of the Colony who died in Singapore on 7 December 1899. This tablet is erected by the members of the Civil Service of the Straits Settlements."

Marines from HMS Hermione served as an honour guard and pallbearers for the Mitchell's funeral.

== Awards and honours ==
Charles Mitchell was invested with Companion of the Most Distinguished Order of St. Michael and St. George (CMG) in 1880, Knight Commander of the Order of St Michael and St George (KCMG) in 1883 and Knight Grand Cross of the Order of St Michael and St George (GCMG) in 1895.

== Legacy ==
Mitchell Park Zoo in Durban, South Africa is named after him.

Government offices
Preceded by Redvers Buller as Governor	Acting Governor of Natal; 1881–1882	Succeeded by Sir Henry Bulwer as Governor
Preceded by Sir John Bates Thurston as acting High Commissioner and Governor	High Commissioner for the Western Pacific; 1887–1888	Succeeded by Sir John Bates Thurston
Preceded by Sir John Bates Thurston as acting High Commissioner and Governor	Governor of Fiji; 1887–1888	Succeeded by Sir John Bates Thurston
Preceded by Lord Gormanston as Governor	Acting Governor of the Leeward Islands; 1888	Succeeded by Sir William Frederick Haynes Smith as Governor
Preceded by Sir Arthur Havelock	Governor of Natal; 1889–1893	Succeeded by Sir Francis Haden as acting Governor
Preceded by William Edward Maxwell as acting Governor	Governor of the Straits Settlements; 1894–1899	Succeeded by James Alexander Swettenham as acting Governor
