= Alexander Swettenham =

British colonial administrator

Sir Alexander Swettenham KCMG
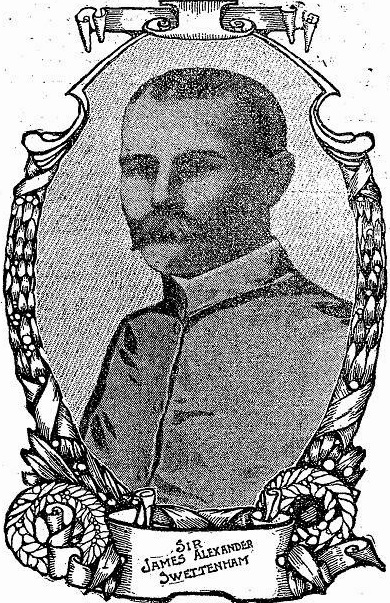

Governor of Jamaica
- In office 30 September 1904 – 1907
- Monarch: Edward VII
- Preceded by: Augustus Hemming
- Succeeded by: Sydney Haldane Olivier

41st Governor of British Guiana
- In office 3 July 1901 – 26 September 1904
- Monarch: Edward VII
- Preceded by: Walter Joseph Sendall
- Succeeded by: Frederick Mitchell Hodgson

Acting Governor of the Straits Settlements
- In office 7 December 1899 – 5 November 1901
- Monarchs: Queen Victoria; Edward VII
- Preceded by: Sir Charles Mitchell
- Succeeded by: Sir Frank Swettenham

7th Colonial Secretary, Straits Settlements
- In office 11 February 1895 – 7 December 1899
- Monarch: Queen Victoria
- Governor: Charles Mitchell
- Preceded by: William Edward Maxwell
- Succeeded by: Walter Egerton (acting); Sir Charles Walter Sneyd Kynnersley (acting)

20th Accountant General and Controller of Revenue
- In office 31 July 1891 – 10 June 1895
- Preceded by: George Thomas Michael O'Brien
- Succeeded by: William Thomas Taylor

Personal details
- Born: James Alexander Swettenham; 1846 Belper, Derbyshire, England
- Died: 19 April 1933 (aged 86–87) La Colline, Switzerland
- Resting place: Vevey, Switzerland
- Spouse: Mary Emily née Copeland (m. 1905)
- Parent: James Oldham Swettenham (father)
- Education: Clare College, Cambridge
- Occupation: Colonial administrator

Sir James Alexander Swettenham KCMG (1846 – 19 April 1933) was a British colonial administrator who was Governor of British Guiana (1901–1904) and Governor of Jamaica (1904–1907).

== Early life ==
Alexander was born the son of James Oldham Swettenham, an attorney-at-law, near Belper, Derbyshire and educated at Clare College, Cambridge.

== Family ==
Alexander’s younger brother, Sir Frank Athelstane Swettenham, was also a colonial administrator.

Alexander married Mary Emily Copeland, a descendant of the Staffordshire Wedgwood family. They had no children.

== Career ==
Alexander joined the Ceylon Civil Service in 1868 and worked there until 1883, before being appointed Receiver-General for Cyprus in 1884, returning to Ceylon in 1891 where he was appointed the 20th Accountant General and Controller of Revenue in Sri Lanka. His appointment commenced on 31 July 1891, succeeding G. T. M. O'Brien, and he held the office until 10 June 1895, when he was succeeded by J. A. Taylor. Alexander moved to Singapore on 11 February 1895 and served as the Colonial Secretary until 1899, becoming acting Governor that year, when Sir Charles Mitchell died in office, until handing over to his brother Frank in November 1901.

From 1901 to 1904 he served as Governor of British Guiana before moving to Jamaica to become Governor there. In 1907 there was a severe earthquake on the island and he was responsible for dealing with its aftermath. When a corps of American marines arrived under Rear-Admiral Charles H. Davis Jr to offer assistance he asked them to leave as he had matters under control. The Americans took offence and caused a diplomatic spat referred to as the Kingston Incident, as a result of which Swettenham was obliged to resign his position.

== Death ==
Alexander died in a clinic in La Colline, Switzerland and was buried in Vevey.

== Honour ==
Alexander was awarded CMG in 1892 and was knighted KCMG in 1898.

Legal offices
Preceded by G. T. M. O'Brien	Accountant General and Controller of Revenue; 1891–1895	Succeeded by William Thomas Taylor
Government offices
Preceded by William Edward Maxwell	Colonial Secretary, Straits Settlements; 1895–1899	Succeeded by Walter Egerton; Charles Walter Sneyd Kynnersley as acting Colonial Secretaries
Preceded by Sir Charles Mitchell as Governor	Acting Governor of the Straits Settlements; 1899–1901	Succeeded by Sir Frank Swettenham as Governor
Preceded by Walter Joseph Sendall	Governor of British Guiana; 1901–1904	Succeeded by Frederick Mitchell Hodgson
Preceded by Hugh Clarence Bourne	Governor of Jamaica; 1904–1907	Succeeded by Hugh Clarence Bourne
