= 1883 Cypriot legislative election =

Legislative elections were held in Cyprus on 6, 7 and 8 June 1883. They were the first elections to the newly established Legislative Council.

== Background ==
The Legislative Council was formed in 1882, and consisted of six official members appointed by the High Commissioner and twelve elected members, three of which were Muslims and nine of which were non-Muslims.

== Electoral system ==
The island was divided into three constituencies, each formed of two districts. Each constituency elected one Muslim and three non-Muslims. Muslim voters had one vote, whilst non-Muslims could vote for up to three candidates. Due to the high levels of illiteracy, voting was not secret, with voters required to tell the polling officers their candidates of choice, which they were required to do in front of the candidates or their agents.

Suffrage was limited to men aged over 21 who had been permanent residents during the five years prior to the election, and had paid either the verghi tax (which was levied as an annual payment of one four-thousandth of a property's value, 4% of rental income or 3% on profits or salaries) or rent for a dwelling or shop within the last year. However, of the estimated 40,000 taxpayers in the territory at the time of the elections, only those that had been able to pay their taxes on time were able to register to vote. A total of 21,073 voters were registered, of which 16,727 were Greek.

== Campaign ==
=== Muslim ===
Mehemet Ali Fehim and Ahmed Rashid were the sole Muslim candidates for the Larnaca–Famagusta and Limassol–Paphos constituencies respectively. Both were elected unopposed.

The Nicosia–Kyrenia constituency was contested by three Muslim candidates from Nicosia, including Keoroghluzade Hussein Ata.

=== Non-Muslim ===
The Larnaca–Famagusta constituency was contested by six non-Muslim candidates; Sotiris Amfietzis (Mayor of Famagusta), Kyprianos Economides (Bishop of Kition), Richardos Matei (an agronomist and landowner), Theodoros Peristianis (a lawyer), Zenon D. Pierides (a trader) and Arthur Young, a British district commissioner.

The Limassol–Paphos constituency was contested by eight non-Muslim candidates; Christodoulos Karydis (Mayor of Limassol), Georgios Loukas (a teacher), Georgios Malikides (a trader), Christodoulos Modinos, Dimitrios Nikolaidis (a trader), Tourmousis Paschalidis (a trader), Dimosthenis Pilavakis (a landowner) and Kyprianos Economides, who was also running in Larnaca–Famagusta.

In Nicosia–Kyrenia, six non-Muslim candidates contested the three seats; Efstathios Constantinides (a professor), Paschalis Constantinides (a lawyer and money lender, and brother of Efstathios), Grigorios Dimitriadis (a landowner), Ioannis Pavlidis (a teacher), Michalis Siakallis (a grain dealer), and Richardos Matei, who was also running in Larnaca–Famagusta. Although the Governor of Nicosia had pointed out to the Registrar that Matei was not registered to vote and could not be a candidate, his nomination was accepted.

== Results ==
=== Muslim seats ===
Constituency	Elected member
Larnaca–Famagusta	Mehemet Ali Fehim
Limassol–Paphos	Ahmed Rashid
Nicosia–Kyrenia	Keoroghluzade Hussein Ata
Source: Collection of British reports

=== Non-Muslim seats ===
Constituency	Candidate	Votes	%	Notes
Larnaca–Famagusta	Kyprianos Economides	2,108	74.8	Elected
Larnaca–Famagusta	Zenon D. Pierides	1,817	64.5	Elected
Larnaca–Famagusta	Theodoros Peristianis	1,392	49.4	Elected
Larnaca–Famagusta	Richardos Matei	1,373	48.7	
Larnaca–Famagusta	Sotiris Amfietzis	166	5.9	
Larnaca–Famagusta	Arthur Young	43	1.5	
Limassol–Paphos	Georgios Malikides	2,773	86.5	Elected
Limassol–Paphos	Dimitrios Nikolaidis	2,773	83.3	Elected
Limassol–Paphos	Kyprianos Economides	2,657	79.9	Elected
Limassol–Paphos	Tourmousis Paschalidis	479	14.4	
Limassol–Paphos	Christodoulos Karydis	399	12.0	
Limassol–Paphos	Dimosthenis Pilavakis	291	8.7	
Limassol–Paphos	Georgios Loukas	78	2.3	
Limassol–Paphos	Christodoulos Modinos	43	1.3	
Nicosia–Kyrenia	Michalis Siakallis	2,337	77.2	Elected
Nicosia–Kyrenia	Paschalis Constantinides	2,013	66.5	Elected
Nicosia–Kyrenia	Efstathios Constantinides	1,965	64.9	Elected
Nicosia–Kyrenia	Richardos Matei	1,097	36.2	
Nicosia–Kyrenia	Ioannis Pavlidis	1,035	34.2	
Nicosia–Kyrenia	Grigorios Dimitriadis	580	19.2	
Total ballots cast		9,172		
Registered voters/turnout		16,727	54.8	
Source: Protopapas

== Aftermath ==
Kyprianos Economides (Bishop of Kition), was elected in both Larnaca–Famagusta and Limassol–Paphos. He informed the High Commissioner that he intended to keep his Larnaca–Famagusta. A by-election was subsequently arranged for 17 July, which was contested by Dimostheni Chatzipavlou, Michail Efthyvoulos and Georgios Loukas, a losing candidate from the original elections. Chatzipavlou was elected with 1,172 votes to 231 for Efthyvoulos and 45 for Loukas; voter turnout was just 24.6%.

Michalis Siakallis died within a year of the election, and a by-election was held in the Nicosia–Kyrenia on 4 March. Ioannis Pavlidis, who had finished fifth in the 1883 elections, was elected with 505 votes, defeating Nikolaos Róssos (429 votes) and Theodoulos Konstantinidis (85). Voter turnout was only 16.1% of the 6,324 electorate.

Limassol–Paphos representative Dimostheni Chatzipavlou resigned from the Council in 1884. In the by-election on 5 November, Dimitris Pieridis was elected with 820 votes, defeating Ioannis Karemfylakis (175 votes). Voter turnout was 15.6% of the 6,533 electorate.

The final by-election of the Council's first term was held on 24 December 1885 following the resignation of Pieridis. Socrates Fragoudis was elected with 686 votes, defeating Karemfylaki (60 votes). Voter turnout was 15.4% of the 4,849 electorate.
