= Frank Swettenham =

British colonial official in Malaya

Sir Frank Swettenham GCMG CH
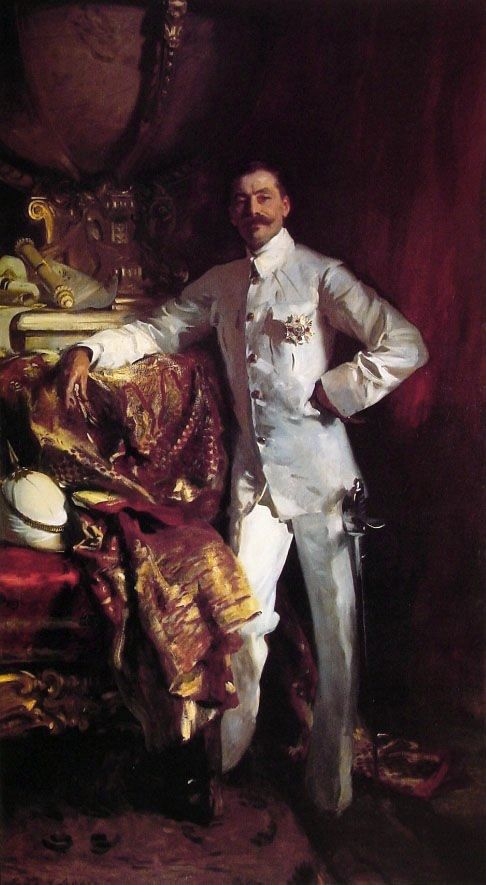
- Oil painting of Swettenham by John Singer Sargent, 1904

King of Arms of the Order of St Michael and St George
- In office 1925–1938
- Preceded by: Sir Montagu Ommanney
- Succeeded by: Sir William Weigall
- Majority: British

15th Governor and Commander-in-Chief of the Straits Settlements
- In office 5 November 1901 – 16 April 1904
- Monarchs: Queen Victoria; Edward VII
- Preceded by: James Alexander Swettenham (acting Governor)
- Succeeded by: Sir John Anderson

Resident-General of the Federated Malay States
- In office 1 July 1896 – 4 November 1901
- Preceded by: Newly Created
- Succeeded by: William Hood Treacher

5th British Resident of Perak
- In office 1 June 1889 – 30 June 1896
- Preceded by: Hugh Low
- Succeeded by: William Hood Treacher

3rd British Resident of Selangor
- In office September 1882 – March 1884
- Preceded by: William Bloomfield Douglas
- Succeeded by: John Pickersgill Rodger

2nd British Resident of Perak
- In office 5 November 1875 – March 1876
- Preceded by: James W.W. Birch
- Succeeded by: James G. Davidson

Personal details
- Born: 28 March 1850 Belper, England
- Died: 11 June 1946 (aged 96) London, UK
- Spouses: Constance Sydney Holmes (a.k.a. Sydney Swettenham) (m. 1878; div. 1938) Vera Seton Guthrie (m. 1939–1946)
- Occupation: Colonial official

Sir Frank Athelstane Swettenham GCMG CH (28 March 1850 – 11 June 1946) was a British colonial administrator who became the first Resident general of the Federated Malay States, which brought the Malay states of Selangor, Perak, Negeri Sembilan and Pahang together under the administration of a Resident-General based in Kuala Lumpur. He served from 1 July 1896 to 4 November 1901. He was also an amateur painter, photographer and antique collector.

== Early life ==
He was born in Belper, Derbyshire, the son of attorney James Oldham Swettenham, and Charlotte Elizabeth Carr, and was educated at the Dollar Academy in Scotland and St Peter's School, York. He was a descendant of Mathew Swetenham, Henry IV's bow bearer, and the younger brother of the colonial administrator Sir James Alexander Swettenham.

== Career ==
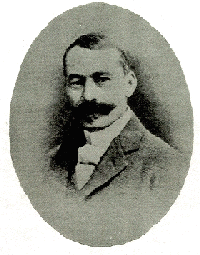
Sir Frank Swettenham

Swettenham was a British colonial official in British Malaya who had a profound influence on British policy and the structure of British administration in the Malay Peninsula.

In 1871, Swettenham was first sent to Singapore as a cadet in the civil service of the Straits Settlements (Singapore, Malacca, and Penang Island). He learned the Malay language and played a major role as British–Malay intermediary in the events surrounding British intervention in the peninsular Malay states in the 1870s.

He was a member of the Commission for the Pacification of Larut set up following the signing of the Pangkor Treaty of 1874 and he served alongside John Frederick Adolphus McNair, and Chinese Kapitan Chung Keng Quee and Chin Seng Yam. The commission was successful in freeing many women taken as captives during the Larut Wars (1862–73), getting stockades dismantled and getting the tin mining business going again.

More than a decade later, in 1882, he was appointed Resident (adviser) to the Malay state of Selangor. During his time in office in Selangor, he successfully promoted the development of coffee and tobacco estates and helped boost tin earnings by constructing a railway from Kuala Lumpur (the then capital of Selangor), to the port of Klang, which was later named Port Swettenham in his honour.

He acquired the title of Resident-General after he secured an agreement of federation from the states of Perak, Selangor, Negri Sembilan, and Pahang in 1895, when he was Resident of Perak state. In the 1897 Diamond Jubilee Honours he was appointed a Knight Commander of the Order of St Michael and St George (KCMG) by Queen Victoria, and in October 1901, three years before his retirement, he was appointed Governor and Commander-in-Chief of the Straits Settlements.

Swettenham had long been critical of the influence of Siam in the northern Malay states of Kelantan and Trengganu, which had traditionally recognised the suzerainty of Siam by sending a tribute of a golden flower to the King of Siam every three years. After his appointment as Governor of the Straits Settlements, he attempted to negotiate with Siam for greater British influence over the affairs of these states. Siam reluctantly agreed to appoint British advisors, but only on the condition that they were appointed by Bangkok, not by the Foreign Office as he had hoped. However, the process had been initiated whereby these two states and eventually Kedah would eventually accept British Residents. Swettenham was disappointed in his ultimate goal of bringing the southern Thai region of Patani under British control.

He was one of close to forty former British Empire officials to oppose the Malayan Union.

== Writings ==
Swettenham co-authored a A Dictionary of the Malay Language with Hugh Clifford. The dictionary, which was published in stages between 1894 and 1902, was abandoned after the letter 'G' as by then it had been made redundant by the publication of R.J. Wilkinson's A Malay English Dictionary.

He also published four books: Malay Sketches, Unaddressed Letters, Also & Perhaps and Arabella in Africa, the last being illustrated by the famous mural painter and illustrator, Rex Whistler. The book was Whistler's first official commission.

== Personal life ==
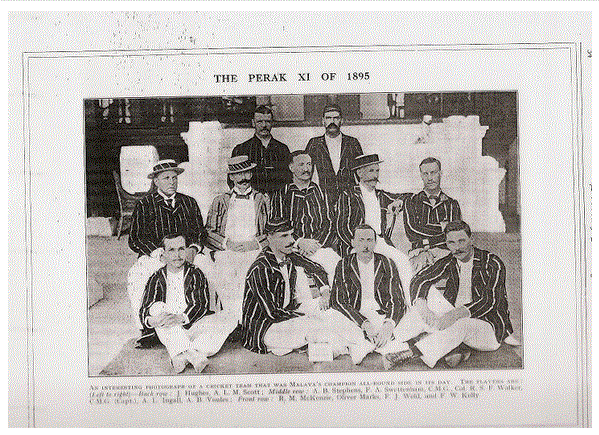
Perak Cricket Team in 1895 including Swettenham (middle row, 2nd left) and Col. Robert Sandilands Frowd Walker (Middle row, centre)

While on home leave in England in the summer of 1877, Swettenham met and became engaged to Constance Sydney Holmes (b. 1858), daughter of Cecil Frederick Holmes, a housemaster at Harrow School. They married in England in February 1878 and returned together to Singapore, where the nineteen-year old Sydney Swettenham attempted to come to terms with her new role as the wife of a colonial official. Their marriage, which was strained from the beginning and marked by long periods of separation, lasted until 1938, when Frank Swettenham successfully sued for divorce on the grounds of his wife's insanity.

Swettenham became friends with Gertrude Bell when she visited Singapore in 1903 and maintained a correspondence with her until 1909. They are thought to have had a "brief but passionate affair" after his retirement to England.

Frank Swettenham remarried at the age of 89, this time to Vera Seton Guthrie (1890–1970) on 22 June 1939, daughter of John Gordon, a Scotch-American successful merchant and millionaire, and widow of John Neil Guthrie, who had been killed in action in France during World War I.

While in India in 1883 preparing for the Colonial Exhibition in Calcutta, Swettenham met and had a child with an Anglo-Indian woman from Bangalore (known only as Miss Good). To avoid a scandal, the mother of Swettenham's son was married to an English clerk in the Perak civil service, Walter McKnight Young, and his son was raised as Walter Aynsley Young.

== Honours ==
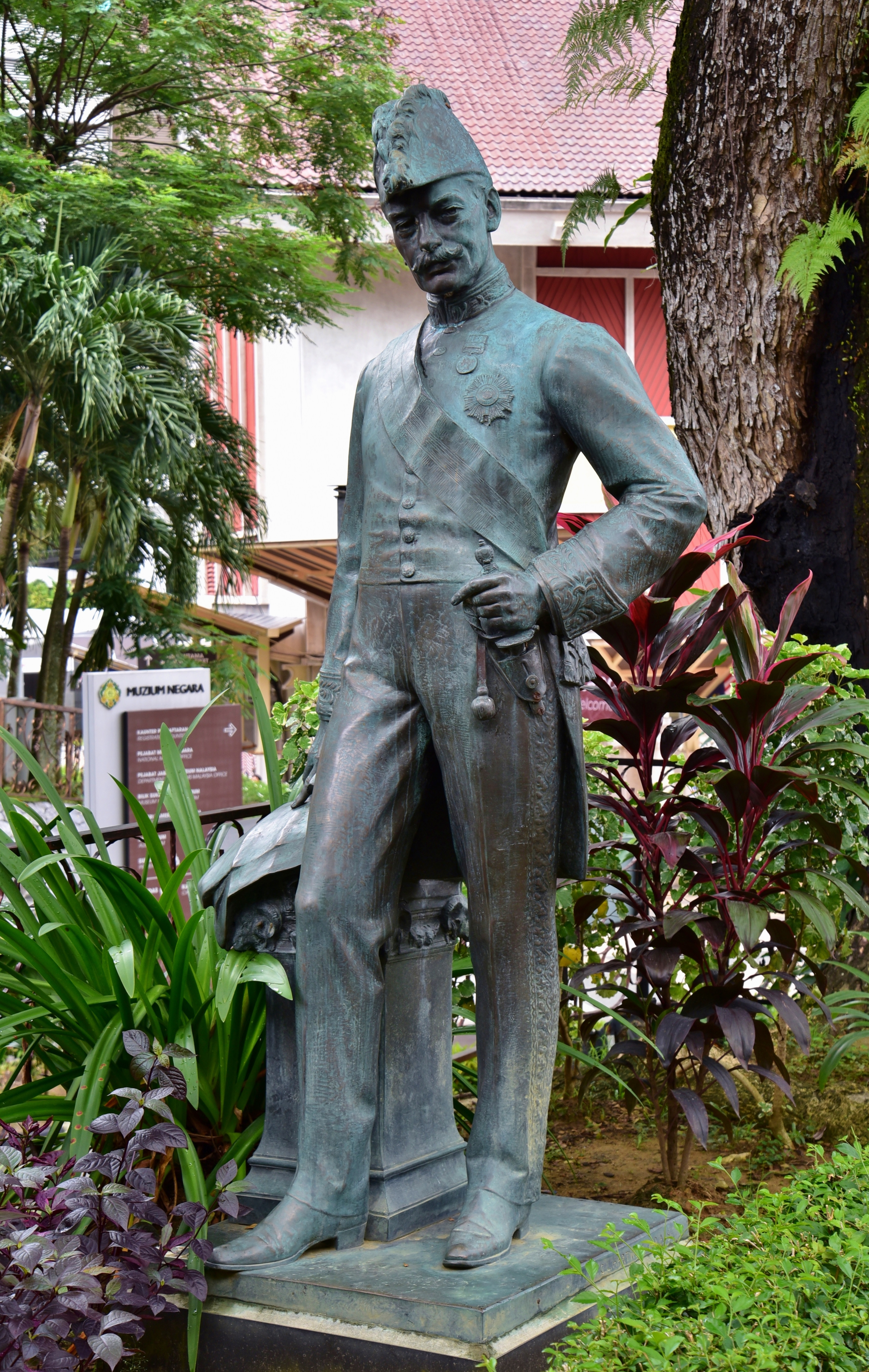
A statue of Swettenham within the compound of Muzium Negara at Kuala Lumpur, Malaysia.

- Companion of the Order of St Michael and St George (CMG) (1886)
- Knight Commander of the Order of St Michael and St George (KCMG) – Sir (1897)
- Knight Grand Cross of the Order of St Michael and St George (GCMG) – Sir (1909)
- Member of the Order of the Companions of Honour (CH) (1917)
- King of Arms of the Order of St Michael and St George (1925)

== Chronology ==
- He was Deputy Commissioner with the Perak Expedition from 1875 to 1876.
- British Resident of Selangor in 1882, of Perak from 1889 to 1896.
- Resident-General of the Federated Malay States (now Malaysia) in 1896–1901.
- Governor and Commander-in-Chief of the Straits Settlements 1901–1904.
- Chaired the royal commission to enquire into the affairs of Mauritius in 1909.
- He was also joint director of the Official Press Bureau from 1915 to 1919.

== Legacy ==
A number of places and roads in Malaysia and Singapore were named after Swettenham, including Mount Swettenham in Cameron Highlands, Swettenham Pier in George Town, Penang Island and Swettenham Road (near the Botanic Gardens) in Singapore.

Before 1972, Port Klang in Selangor was known as Port Swettenham which was opened in September 1901.

== Publications ==
- Burns, P.L., and Cowan, C.D. ed. (1975), Sir Frank Swettenham's Malayan journals 1874–1876, Kuala Lumpur, London: Oxford University Press.
- Clifford, Hugh Charles, and Swettenham, Frank Athelstane (1894), A dictionary of the Malay language, Taiping, Perak: Printed for the author's at the Government's printing office.
- Cowan, C.D. ed. (1952), "Sir Frank Swettenham's Perak journals 1874–1876", Journal of the Malayan branch of the Royal Asiatic Society, vol.24, part 4. Singapore: Malaya Publishing House.
- Swettenham, Frank Athelstane (1881), Vocabulary of the English and Malay languages. Singapore: printed at the Government Printing Office.
- Swettenham, Frank Athelstane (1893), Map to illustrate the Siamese question. W. & A.K. Johnston Limited.
- Swettenham, Frank Athelstane (1893), About Perak. Singapore: Straits Times Press.
- Swettenham, Frank Athelstane (1895), Malay sketches. London: John Lane.
- Swettenham, Frank Athelstane (1898), Unaddressed letters. London: John Lane.
- Swettenham, Frank Athelstane (1899), The real Malay. London: John Lane.
- Swettenham, Frank Athelstane (1907), British Malaya. London: John Lane.
- Swettenham, Frank Athelstane (1910), Report of the Mauritius royal commission, 1909. HMSO.
- Swettenham, Frank Athelstane (1912), Also and perhaps. London: John Lane.
- Swettenham, Frank Athelstane (1925), 'Arabella in Africa'. London: John Lane.
- Swettenham, Frank Athelstane (1942), 'Footprints in Malaya'. London: Hutchinson.
- Swettenham, Frank Athelstane (1946 ?), 'The future of Malaya'. [S.l.]: [s.n.]
- Swettenham, Frank Athelstane (1967), 'Stories and sketches'. Kuala Lumpur: Oxford University Press.
- "The Straits Settlements and Beyond" . The Empire and the century. London: John Murray. 1905. pp. 827–834.

Political offices
Preceded by James W. W. Birch	British Resident of Perak; 1875–1876	Succeeded by James G. Davidson
Preceded by William Bloomfield Douglas	British Resident of Selangor; 1882–1884	Succeeded by John Pickersgill Rodger
Preceded by Hugh Low	British Resident of Perak; 1889–1896	Succeeded by William Hood Treacher
New title	Resident-General of the Federated Malay States; 1896–1901	Succeeded by William Hood Treacher
Government offices
Preceded by James Alexander Swettenham (acting)	Governor of the Straits Settlements; 1901–1904	Succeeded by Sir John Anderson
Heraldic offices
Preceded by Sir Montagu Ommanney	King of Arms of the Order of St Michael and St George; 1925–1938	Succeeded by Sir William Weigall
