= The Istana =

Official residence of the President of the Republic of Singapore

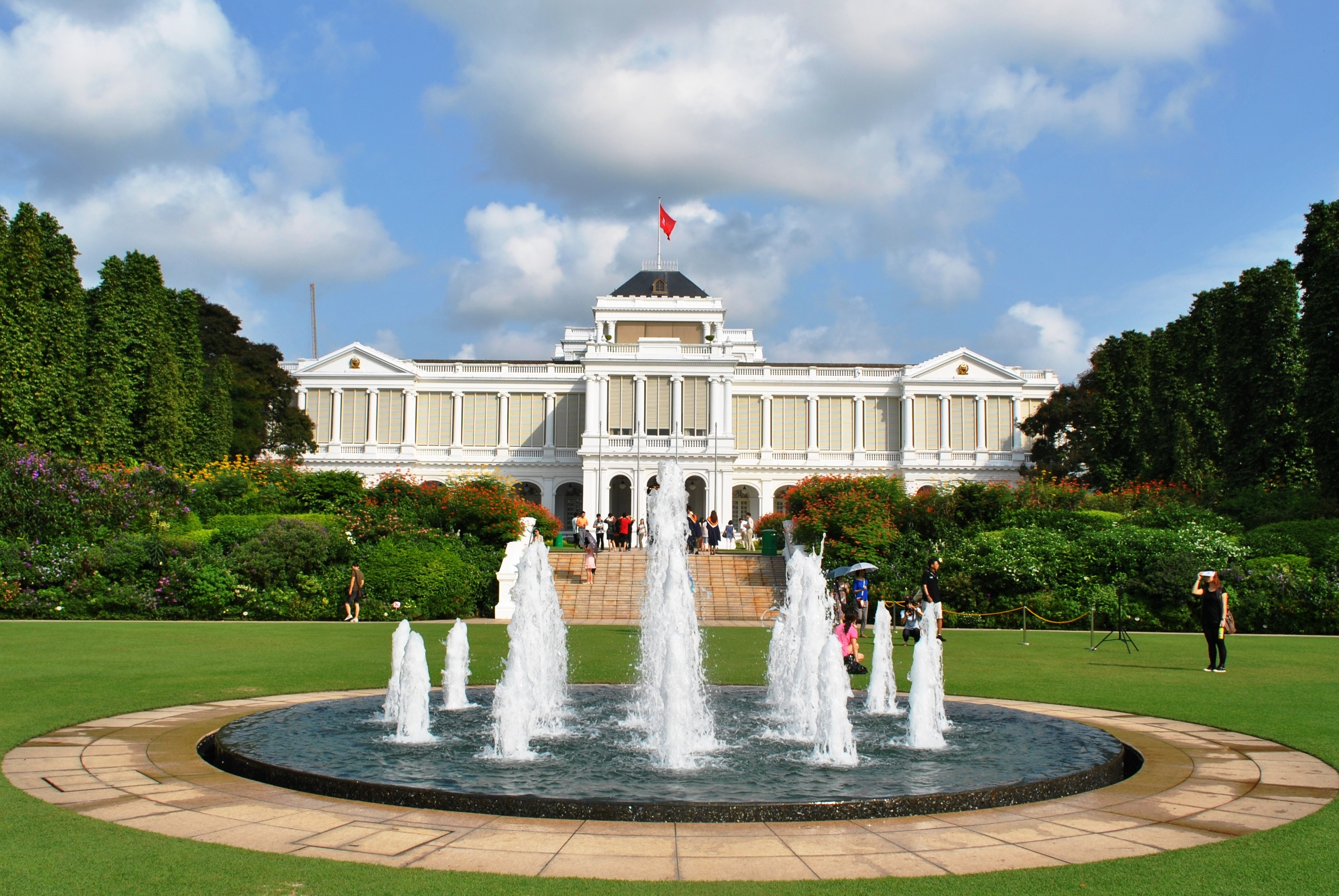
- The northern facade of The Istana
- Interactive map of the The Istana area
- Former names: Government House of Singapore (1869–1959); Istana Negara Singapura (1959–1965)

General information
- Type: Mansion
- Architectural style: Palladian
- Location: Orchard, Singapore, Orchard Road, Singapore 238823
- Coordinates: 1°18′28″N 103°50′35″E
- Current tenants: Tharman Shanmugaratnam, President of Singapore
- Construction started: 1867; 159 years ago
- Completed: 1869; 157 years ago
- Owner: Government of Singapore

Technical details
- Floor count: 3
- Floor area: 106 acres (0.43 km^{2})

Design and construction
- Architect: John Frederick Adolphus McNair

National monument of Singapore
- Designated: 14 February 1992; 34 years ago
- Reference no.: 24

The Istana houses the offices of the President and Prime Minister of Singapore and is a venue for state events and important official functions.

The Istana is also the office of the prime minister of Singapore and contains Sri Temasek, the official residence of the prime minister since Singapore's independence in 1965, though none of the prime ministers have ever lived there.

The 106 acres (0.43 km^{2}) estate was once part of the extensive nutmeg plantation of Mount Sophia. In 1867, the British colonial government acquired the land and built a mansion to be the official home of the British governor. This continued until 1959 when Singapore was granted self-governance, and the governor was replaced by the Yang di-Pertuan Negara, who was in turn replaced by the president of Singapore.

The Istana was gazetted as a national monument on 14 February 1992.

== History ==
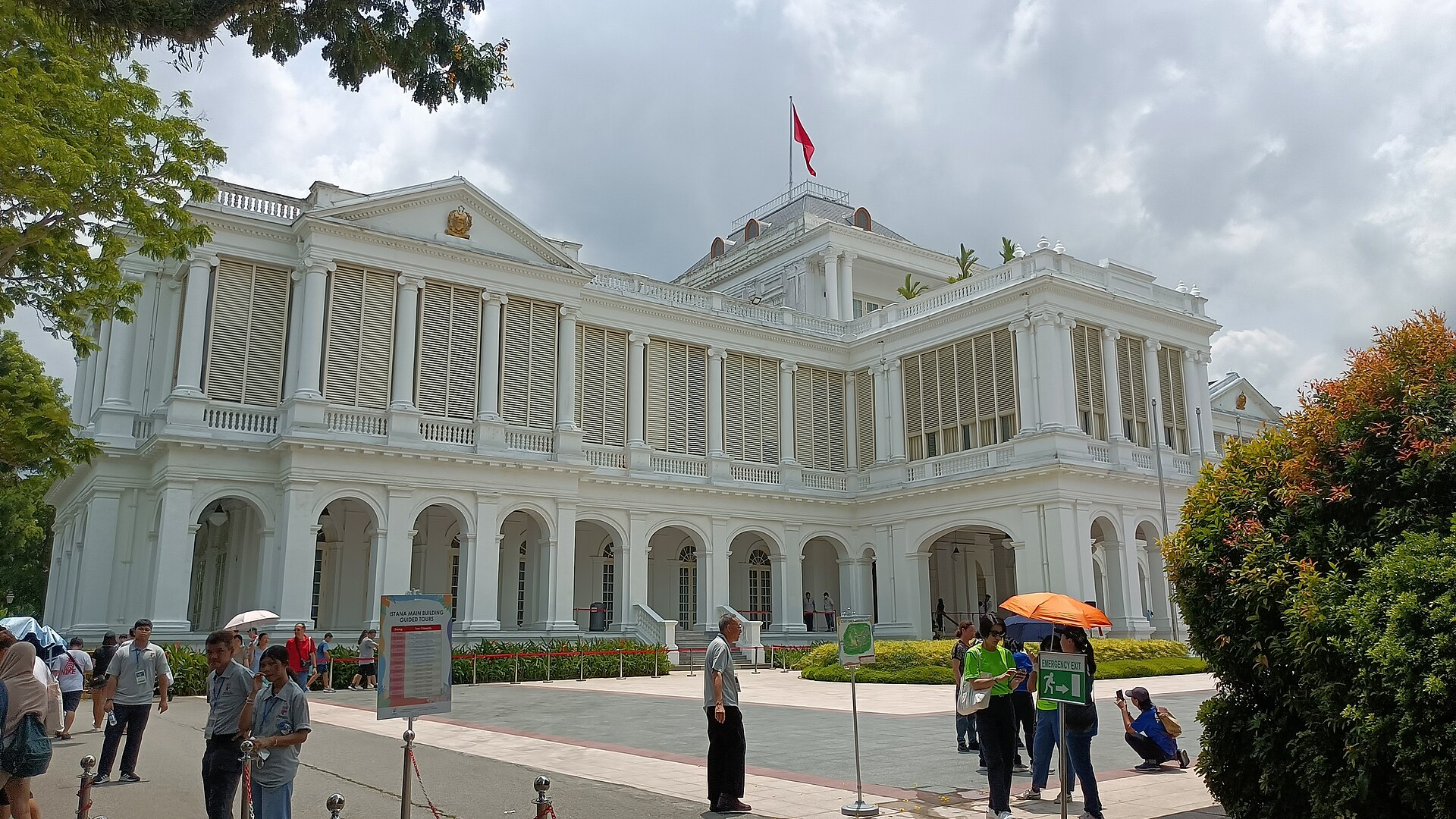
The front façade of the Istana, which once won accolades from its occupants, writers, and visitors

=== Construction and colonial era ===
The Istana was built between 1867 and 1869 as the official residence of the Governor of the Straits Settlements. The site, formerly part of a nutmeg plantation owned by merchant Charles Robert Prinsep, was acquired by the colonial government after the collapse of the nutmeg trade in Singapore.

The building was designed by engineer John Frederick Adolphus McNair, who later became Colonial Engineer and Superintendent of Convicts. Indian convict labour was used extensively in the construction of the building and its grounds.

Originally known as Government House, the building was first occupied by Governor Sir Harry Ord in 1869. The estate became the centre of colonial administration and ceremonial life in Singapore during British rule.

=== Japanese occupation ===
During the Japanese occupation of Singapore between 1942 and 1945, the Istana was occupied by the Japanese military administration and used as an official residence and administrative headquarters. The building reportedly housed senior Japanese officers, including General Tomoyuki Yamashita, commander of Japanese forces in Malaya and Singapore.

Following the surrender of Japan in September 1945, the Istana was returned to British control as part of the re-establishment of colonial administration in Singapore.

=== Post World War II ===
The building continued to be used by governors of the newly created Crown Colony of Singapore after the end of the Japanese occupation.

When Singapore attained self-government as the State of Singapore in 1959, the building was handed over to the Government of Singapore and renamed the Istana Negara Singapura. Sir William Goode became the first local head of state, the Yang di-Pertuan Negara of Singapore, and took office there from 3 June to 3 December 1959, and was followed by Yusof Ishak.

Following the State of Singapore's independence from Malaysia on 9 August 1965 to became the Republic of Singapore, the building was renamed to The Istana and Yusof Ishak's title was changed to the President of Singapore.

=== Present ===
Since its first occupancy in 1869, the Istana has seen 21 terms of governorship (1869–1959), two terms of occupation by the Yang di-Pertuan Negara (1959–1965) and nine terms of presidential occupation (since 1965), not to mention the Japanese occupancy between 1942 and 1945.

The Istana is the official residence of the President of Singapore. However, no presidents nor cabinet ministers have lived there after the tenure of Devan Nair, the third President of Singapore. The villas, which are meant to be used for foreign heads of state, are used rarely.

Public open houses at the Istana began in 1969 and are typically held during major public holidays. The Istana building and its grounds are open to the public on five selected statutory holidays – Chinese New Year, Deepavali, Hari Raya Puasa, Labour Day and National Day. Due to Hari Raya Puasa (Eid al Fitr) moving through the civil year as a Muslim lunar calendar date, the grounds of the Istana are sometimes open only once when two public holidays are near together. The grounds are also often used for state functions and ceremonial occasions such as swearings-in, investitures and the presentation of credentials by heads of foreign missions. The Prime Minister, Senior Minister and Minister Mentor have their offices in the Istana Annex.

On the first Sunday of the month, there is a Changing of the Guards parade, which is a popular public event.

The building underwent extensive renovations between 1996 and 1998 to increase space and modernise its facilities. The building contains function rooms used for ceremonial and entertainment purposes, while the offices of the President of Singapore and presidential staff are also located there.

== Architecture ==
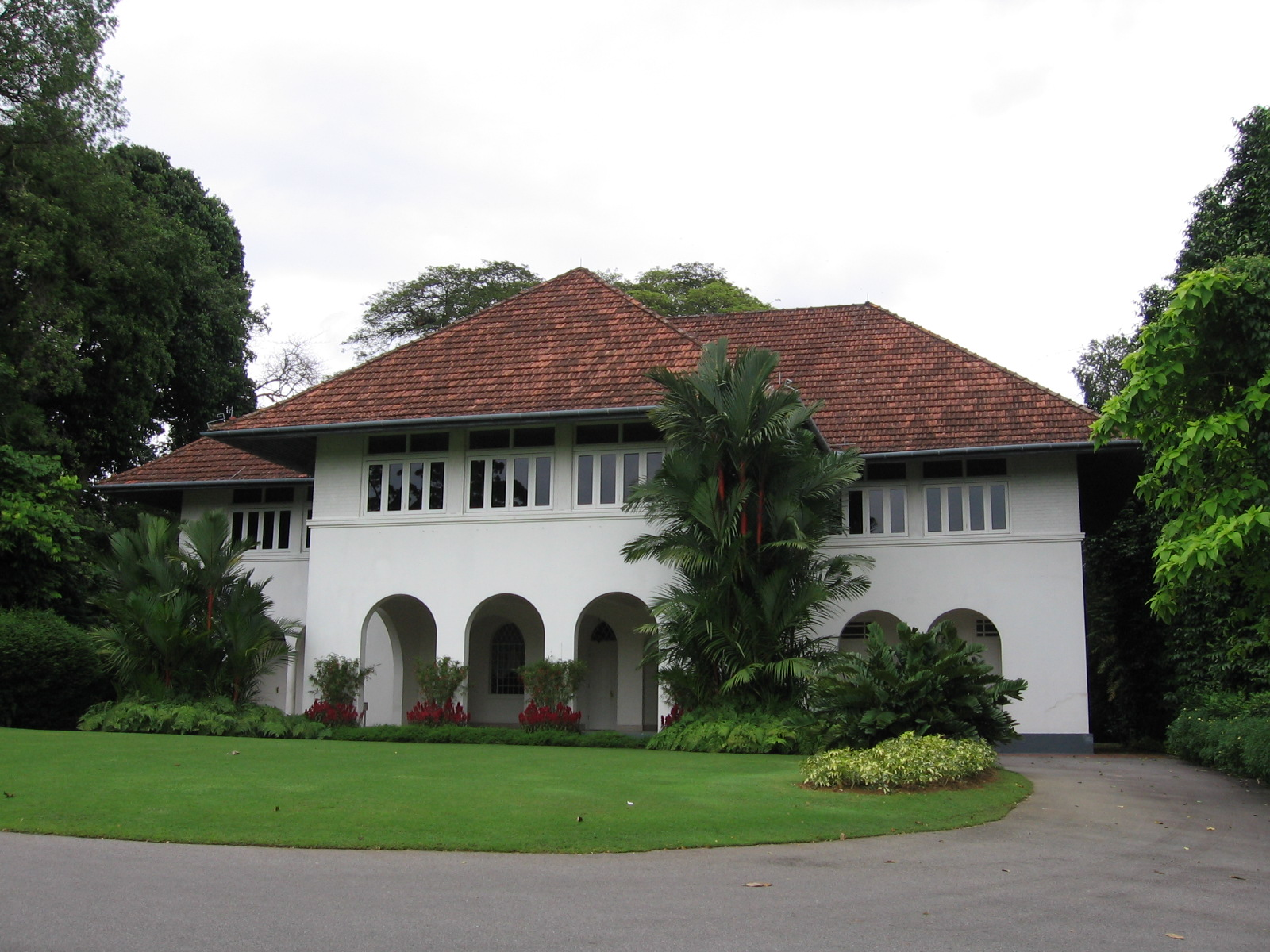
The Istana Villa

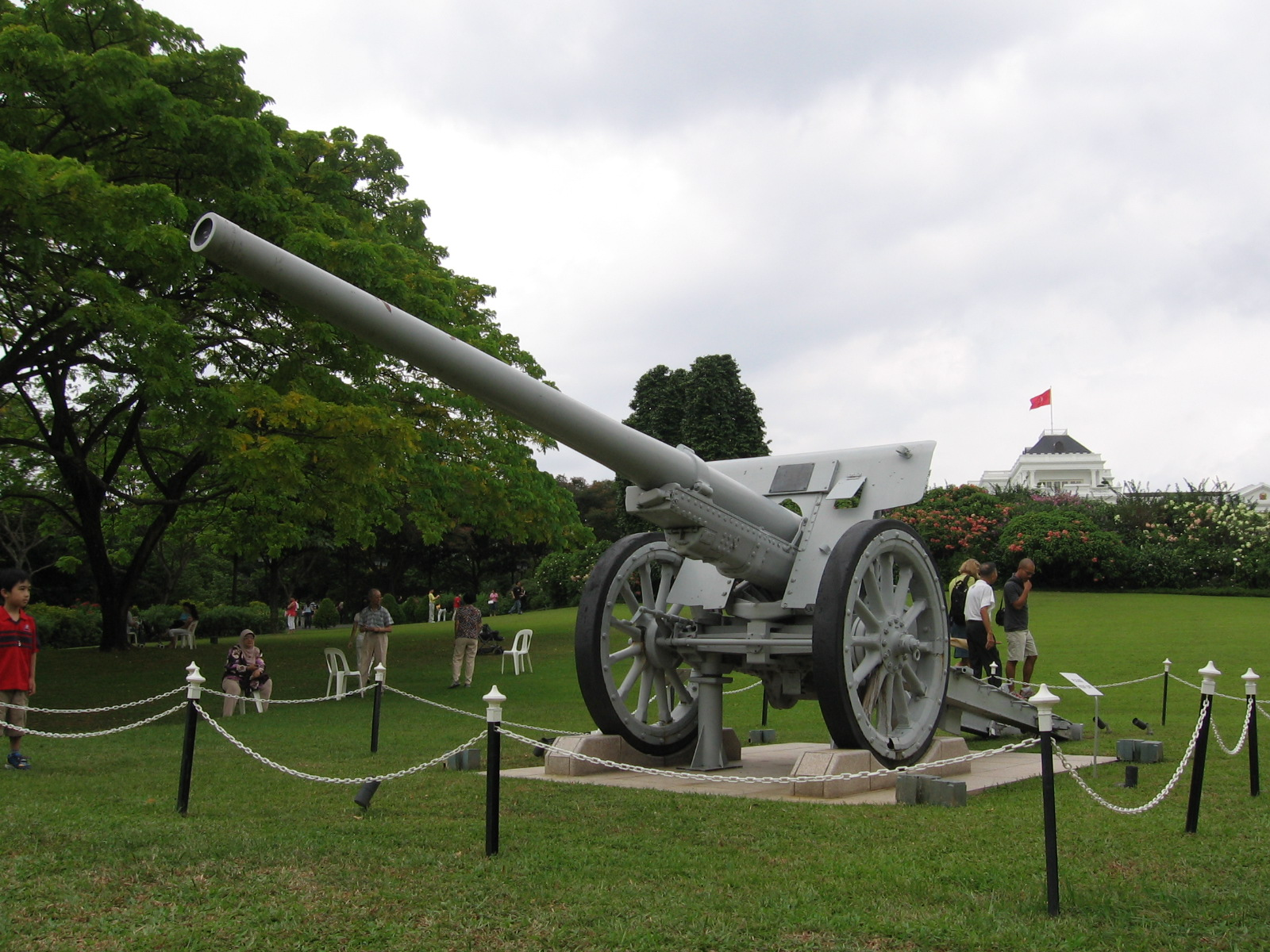
The Japanese field-artillery gun on display on the Istana grounds

The Istana is similar to many 18th-century neo-Palladian style buildings designed by British military engineers in India. It has a tropical layout like a Malay house, surrounded by statuesque columns, deep verandahs, louvred windows and panelled doors to promote cross-ventilation. The central three-storey 28-metre-high tower block dominates the building. The reasonably well-proportioned two-storey side wings feature Ionic, Doric and Corinthian orders with Ionic colonnades at the second storey and Doric colonnades at the first storey. The building sits in its elevated position overlooking its stately grounds, the Domain, reminiscent of the great gardens of England.

=== Conservation and restoration ===
The Istana underwent major restoration and upgrading works between 1996 and 1998 to modernise its infrastructure while preserving its historic architectural features. The project included the expansion of function spaces, upgrading of mechanical and electrical systems, and conservation of original architectural elements.

As a gazetted national monument, conservation works at the Istana are carried out in accordance with guidelines established by the National Heritage Board and the Urban Redevelopment Authority.

The grounds and gardens are also periodically restored and replanted as part of long-term landscape conservation efforts.

=== Buildings and structures in the grounds ===
- Sri Temasek, also built in 1869 for the Colonial Secretary of the Straits Settlements, has been the official residence of the Prime Minister of Singapore since independence.
- The Annexe.
- The Istana Villa (1938).
- The Lodge (1974).
- The Japanese field-artillery gun (a Type 92 10 cm cannon), presented to the leader of the returning victorious British forces to Singapore, Lord Louis Mountbatten, following the official Japanese surrender to the British in 1945 at the end of WWII.
- Marsh Garden (1970).
- Victoria Pond.
- A nine-hole golf course.
- A burial place of Bencoolen Muslims who came to Singapore between 1825 and 1828 is located on the southern slopes of the grounds close to the Orchard Road entrance.

=== Grounds and gardens ===
The Istana grounds contain a variety of landscaped gardens, ponds and mature trees accumulated over more than a century of development. The estate is known for its biodiversity and contains numerous heritage trees and rare plant species.

More than 100 species of birds have been recorded within the Istana grounds, including migratory and native species.

== Security and accessibility ==
The Istana grounds are protected by the Singapore Armed Forces Military Police and officers from the Singapore Police Force. Access to the main building and grounds is restricted except during official events and designated public open houses.

Members of the public are permitted to enter selected areas of the grounds during open house events, which are typically held on major public holidays.

The main entrance to the Istana is located at the junction of Orchard Road and Cavenagh Road. The nearest Mass Rapid Transit stations are Dhoby Ghaut, Somerset and Orchard.

== Rooms in the main building ==
=== First floor ===
- The Reception Hall is where the president receives visiting dignitaries and foreign heads of state. Tea receptions are also held there after state dinners.
- In the Banquet Hall, guests dine with the president and are entertained. At the end of the hall is a trompe-l'œil painted with a backdrop of orchids. The room, formerly part of the kitchen and workshops, is also used to display state gifts.
- The State Room is the seat and office of the president. The hall is used for events such as the swearing-in of newly elected Cabinet members or presidents, and for presentations of awards. When it was the sitting room of Sir Shenton Thomas, he had a statue of Queen Victoria at one end of the room. The statue was later removed to make way for the Presidential Chair, the State Flag, and the Presidential Standard.

=== Second floor ===
- The Reception Room is a small parlour on the second floor leading to the East and West Sitting Rooms. It is where the president holds discussions with foreign dignitaries.
- The East Sitting Room features a collection of state gifts, including a set of chinaware made in France and presented to President Benjamin Sheares.
- The West Sitting Room is a parlour that has been used for interviews with heads of state and Members of Parliament. The room retains timber flooring dating from the 1930s. Replicas of Arab tapestries presented by the Sultan of Oman to President Ong Teng Cheong are displayed on the walls.
- The Sheares Room is a private dining hall named after President Benjamin Sheares. It is used by the president and the president's family, and on occasion by Cabinet members.
- The Yusof Room is named after the first president of Singapore, Yusof Ishak. His bust is displayed at the end of the parlour.

=== Mezzanine floor ===
The U-shaped Grand Staircase leads to the second and third floors of the Istana. On the first landing stands the Guardian of the House, a 35-centimetre (14 in) statue made of wood, ivory and mother-of-pearl by Indian labourers involved in the construction of the Istana.

=== Third floor ===
- The President's Lounge serves as the main balcony of the Istana and overlooks the ceremonial square and lawn on the ground floor. The room was styled after the White House's Blue Room.
- The Office of the President of Singapore, which is not open to the public, is located opposite the President's Lounge.

An architectural feature at the top of the main building is a rectangular cupola with a flagpole marking the highest point of the Istana complex. The Presidential Standard flies from the building whenever the president is within the complex.

== See also ==
- The Prime Minister's Office, based in the Istana.
- Istana Kampong Glam, former palace of the Sultan of Johore.
- Government Houses of the British Empire and Commonwealth
- Similar British Malayan colonial residences:
  - Governor's residence in Malacca.
  - Suffolk House and The Residency in Penang.
  - Carcosa in Kuala Lumpur.
