= Governor's Museum =

Museum in Malacca, Malaysia

- Muzium Yang di-Pertua Negeri Melaka
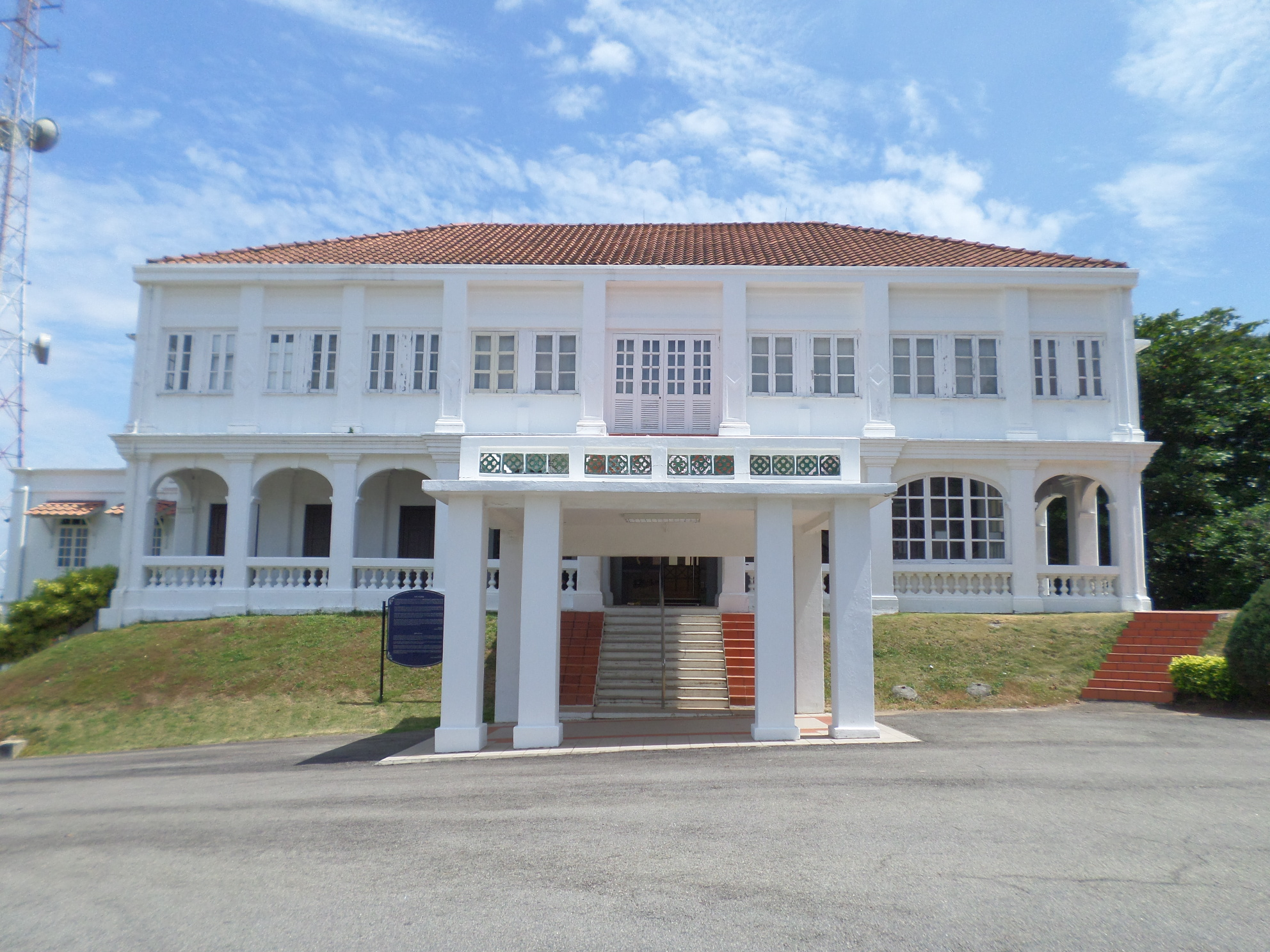
- Former name: Official Residence of the Governor of Malacca/Seri Melaka
- Established: 2002
- Location: Malacca City, Malacca, Malaysia
- Coordinates: 2°11′35.0″N 102°14′59.5″E
- Type: museum
- Owners: Malacca Museum Corporation (PERZIM) (Formerly Office of the Yang di-Pertua Negeri)

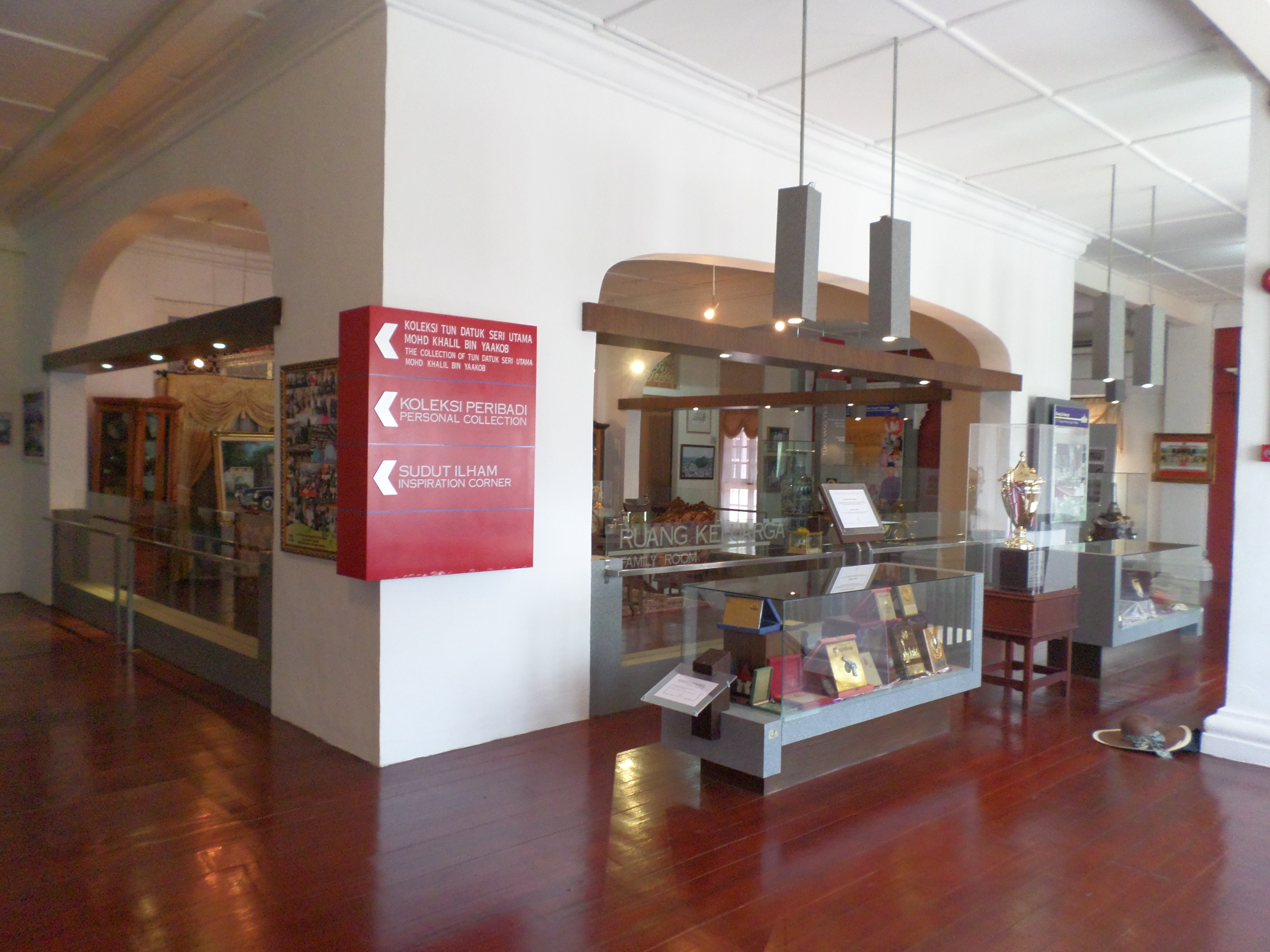
Governor's Museum exhibition hall

The Governor's Museum (Malay: Muzium Yang di-Pertua Negeri Melaka) is a museum atop St. Paul's Hill in Malacca City, Malacca, Malaysia, which exhibits the personal belongings of various governors of Malacca since the independence of Malaya. The museum's building was formerly used as the official residence and office of the Dutch governor of Malacca, as well as the official residence of the Yang di-Pertua Negeri or Governor of Malacca (Seri Melaka) until September 1996, before being turned into a museum and officially opened to the public in 2002.

== See also ==
- List of museums in Malaysia
- List of tourist attractions in Malacca
- Similar British colonial residences:
  - The Istana in Singapore.
  - Suffolk House and The Residency in Penang.
  - Carcosa in Kuala Lumpur.
