= Methodist Boys' School =

Methodist Boys' School may refer to:

- Methodist Boys' School, Penang, a secondary school for boys in Penang, Malaysia
- Methodist Boys' School, Kuala Lumpur, a premier secondary school in Kuala Lumpur, Malaysia
