= Carcosa Seri Negara =

Residence in Kuala Lumpur, Malaysia

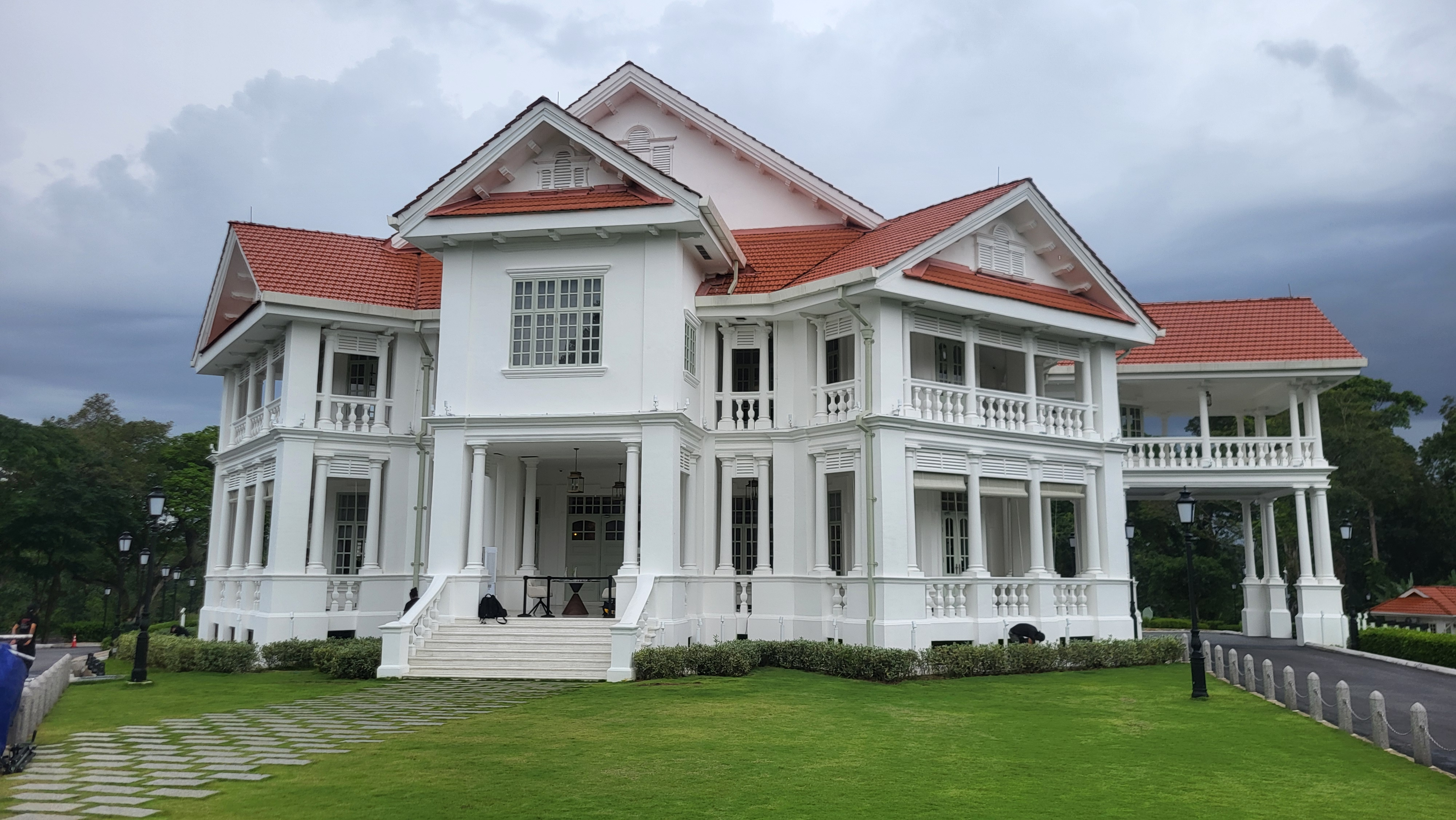
- The Seri Negara mansion in 2026.
- Interactive map of the Carcosa Seri Negara area
- Former names: King's House

General information
- Type: Hotel
- Architectural style: Neo-Gothic & Tudor Revival
- Location: Jalan Kebun Bunga, 50480 Kuala Lumpur, Malaysia
- Construction started: 1896 - 1897

Design and construction
- Architect: A.B. Hubback

The Carcosa Seri Negara is a residence located on two adjacent hills inside the Perdana Botanical Gardens, Kuala Lumpur, Malaysia. Originally built as the official residence and guest house of the British High Commissioner in Malaya, it is now owned by the Government of Malaysia. The name is a composite of the two colonial mansions located on the compound: the residence, named Carcosa (completed in 1898), and the guest house, now named Seri Negara (1913).

The buildings figured prominently in the Malaysian independence movement, with several meetings held there. Since Independence in 1957, it has been used as residences for visiting dignitaries (1957–1989), and as a luxury hotel (1989–2015). Since 2017, it has been used as a museum.

== Design ==
Carcosa Seri Negara refers to two buildings, the larger Carcosa and the smaller (and newer) Seri Negara (or King's House).

=== Carcosa ===
The Carcosa mansion was built in 1896–1897 as the official residence of Sir Frank Swettenham, the first British High Commissioner of the then Resident-General of the Federated Malay States. It was designed by Arthur Benison Hubback under instruction from the State Engineer of Selangor's Public Work Department, Charles Edwin Spooner, and sometimes also credited to Arthur Charles Alfred Norman.

SIR,

In the April magazine your correspondent in Malaya asks me, in courteous terms, to tell him why I gave the name “Carcosa” to the house that was designed and built for me at Kuala Lumpur by the late Mr. C.E. Spooner, assisted by Mr. A.B. Hubback – as he was in those days – and I have no objection to answer the question even though the simple truth may spoil a number of excellent stories. When this house was finished and occupied I read a book which interested me. It was called “The King in Yellow” and at the beginning of this book there were some verses with a note explaining that they came from Cassilda’s song in “The King in Yellow”, Act 1, Scene 2. Here are two verses: -

“Strange is the night where black stars rise, And twin moons circle in the skies, But the stranger still is Lost Carcosa.”

“Song of my soul, my voice is dead; Die thou, unsung, as tears unshed Shall dry and die in Lost Carcosa.”

I did not call the Resident General’s dwelling “Government House,” or “King’s House,” because neither seemed an appropriate name in Protected States. I did not give it a Malay name, because it was to be the residence of a British Officer; so I took a book name as has often been done before.

As to the word Carcosa, I imagine it was the Castle of the King in Yellow, but the book explains nothing about either the place or its occupant. That apparently can be found in the play, to which there are only occasional allusions. Probably it is a word created by the author’s fancy, though it looks like a combination of the Italian words cara and casa and would mean “desirable dwelling,” as indeed I found it.

The only curious fact is that this name was prophetic for, as I understand, the house has lost its name and is thus, “Lost Carcosa.” The occupant, I am told, is now styled “F.S,” instead of “R.G.”

Yours obediently,
FRANK SWETTENHAM

19 April 1936.

— Letter to the Editor of “British Malaya”, published May 1936

According to a letter he wrote in 1936, Swettenham chose the name Carcosa from the name of a mythical city in the horror short story collection The King in Yellow. Swettenham assumed the word was a portmanteau of two Italian words, cara and casa, intended to mean "desirable dwelling".

=== Seri Negara ===
Seri Negara ("Country's Glory" in Malay), was originally known as the Governor's Residence when it was opened in 1913 as the official guest house of Governor of the Straits Settlement. It was later known as the King's House.

== History ==
=== Colonial Malaya ===
Swettenham moved into Carcosa during construction, and the official housewarming party was not held until August 28, 1898. During World War II, the headquarters of the Imperial Japanese Army occupation government of Malaya were at Carcosa Seri Negara.

The Constitution of Malaysia was drafted in Seri Negara between 1955 and 1957. The Federation of Malaya Agreement was signed on August 8, 1957, at King's House, and the property was then vacated by the British High Commissioner on August 31, 1957, when it was returned to the Malayan Government. It was then opened as the Istana Tetamu (Guest's Palace), hosting many visiting dignitaries, including Queen Elizabeth II in 1986.

=== Post-independence ===
With Malayan independence imminent in September 1956, the Chief Minister of Malaya, Tunku Abdul Rahman, presented the deeds of Carcosa and its 40 acres (160,000 m^{2}) of land to the British Government as a gift, a token of goodwill. He moved a resolution in the Federal Legislative Council which read, "That this Council approve of the proposal to make a free gift of the house and buildings known as "Carcosa", together with the gardens and land attached, as a token of the goodwill of the Malayan people to Her Majesty's Government, for use as the residence and office of the future representative of that government in an Independent Federation." Carcosa then became residence to a succession of post-independence diplomatic British High Commissioners.

The Carcosa "issue" was taken up by young radical politicians, in particular Anwar Ibrahim and Mahathir Mohamad, his mentor. Tun Daim Zainuddin successfully led the campaign for the Malaysian government to own it, yet again. In 1987, possession of the Carcosa estate was returned to the Government of Malaysia.

=== Hotel ===
Soon after the acquisition of the estate, the Malaysian government proceeded to repurpose the estate into a hotel, which opened in 1989, by leasing the estate to hospitality companies: first to Malaysia-based Landmark Hotels and Realty from 1989 to 2010 and then to Saujana Hotels & Resorts from 2010 to 2016. From 2004 to 2010, a Singapore-based company managed the day-to-day operations. The lease was set for a renewable 10-year term.

Carcosa and the Guest's Palace both served as hotels, with the latter rebranded as Seri Negara. Marketed as a luxurious heritage boutique hotel, much of the mansions' colonial architecture and interior designs were preserved, carefully adapted, and complemented with colonial-themed hotel service. In its inaugural year as a hotel, Carcosa Seri Negara served as the temporary official residence for Queen Elizabeth II and Prince Philip when the 1989 Commonwealth Heads of Government Meeting was held in Kuala Lumpur. By 2000, Carcosa was subdivided into seven suites, and Seri Negara held six more, each with a personal butler.

After the lease for the estate was officially transferred from Landmark to Saujana in December 2010, only Seri Negara resumed operation as a hotel, carrying the Carcosa Seri Negara brand on its own. Carcosa was largely vacated, confined to limited uses, and had been reported to receive only basic maintenance. After the expiry of Saujana's lease on December 31, 2015, the hotel was entirely closed for business and the estate was placed under the safekeeping of the property and land management division of the Prime Minister's Department. Plans have been made to assign management of the buildings to the Kuala Lumpur City Hall, with a currently undetermined hospitality company conducting day-to-day operations.

==== Logo ====
The Carcosa Seri Negara Logo was designed by Johan Design Associates (JDA) in 1989.

The Logo was derived from metaphors (involving natural elements, environment, humanity, charm and beauty etc.), in this case a swan, are quite common, especially in the hospitality-related outlets, exotic resorts, nature's goodness, romance and gender-enhanced branding, where specific nuances are drawn into play. It exude perceptions of warm hospitality, sense of wellbeing, nature's exuberance, high society living and dining.

==== Afternoon Tea ====
One of Carcosa Seri Negara's trademarks was the English afternoon tea, served in the drawing room, or on the wrap-around verandah, overlooking the gardens. It was served daily.

=== Museum ===
In April 2017, the Asian Heritage Museum (AMH) signed a 3-year lease to rent Carcosa Seri Negara until 2020 where all its repairs will be solely taken responsible by the museum body itself. However, within 1 year before the slated handover in March 2019, the AHM was kicked out from the premises by the Federal Land Commissioner without any explanation with a note of seizure sent to them 1 month later.

=== Gallery ===
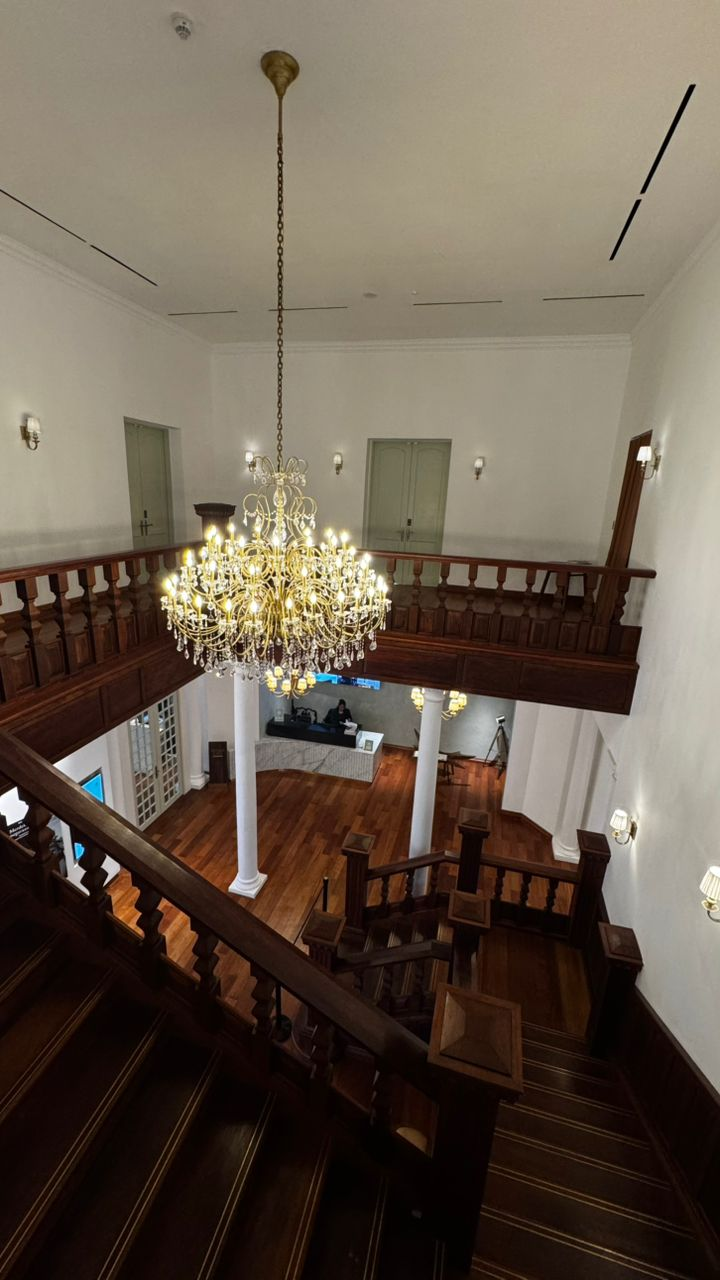
Stairway of the Seri Negara

After extensive renovations Seri Negara was opened to the public on 20 December 2025. It houses a gallery that showcases the building history, a cafe and a restaurant.

== Popular culture ==
- Scenes from the 1964 film The 7th Dawn were filmed at Carcosa Seri Negara.
- The residence appeared in an episode of The Amazing Race: All-Stars, in which competing teams checked into a "Pit Stop" on the property.
- The 2018 film Crazy Rich Asians filmed scenes set at the ancestral Young mansion, named Tyersall Park, based on the former estate in Singapore of the same name, at the then-abandoned Carcosa Seri Negara.
- Carcosa Seri Negara serves as the residences of the Blacketts and Mr Webb in the 2020 television production of The Singapore Grip.

== See also ==
- The Istana, Singapore
- Governor's residence, Malacca
- Suffolk House and The Residency both in Penang
- Hotel Majestic (Kuala Lumpur)
