= Sri Temasek =

Official residence of the Prime Minister of Singapore

- 斯里淡马锡, ஸ்ரீ தெமாசெக்
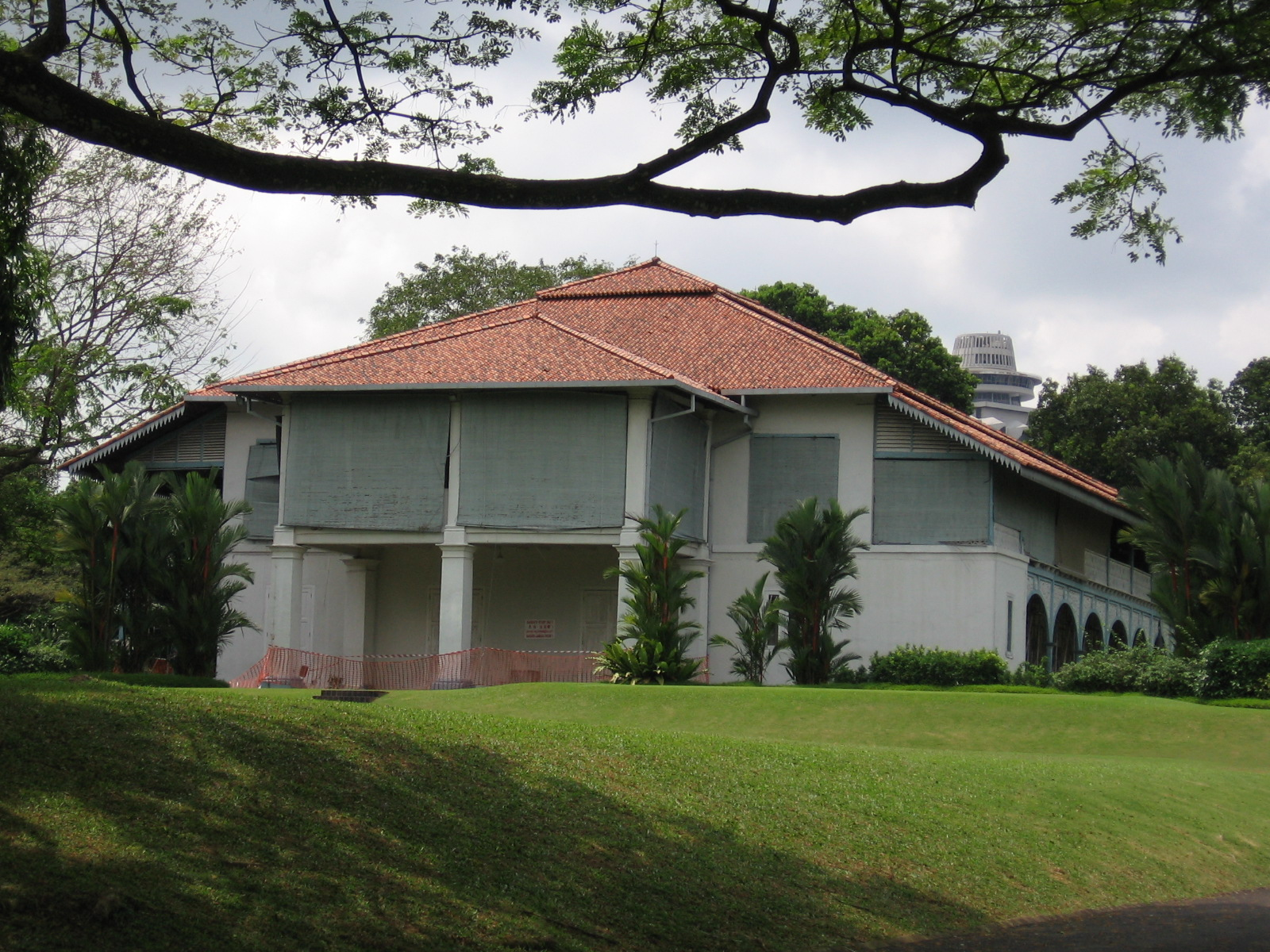
- The southern facade of Sri Temasek

General information
- Type: Detached house
- Location: Newton, Singapore
- Coordinates: 1°18′14″N 103°50′35″E
- Current tenants: None
- Completed: 1869; 157 years ago
- Owner: Government of Singapore

Technical details
- Floor count: 2
- Floor area: 1,600 m^{2} (17,000 sq ft)

Design and construction
- Architect: John Frederick Adolphus McNair
- Awards: Urban Redevelopment Authority Architectural Heritage Award (2008)

National monument of Singapore
- Designated: 14 February 1992; 34 years ago
- Reference no.: 24

Sri Temasek is a two-storey detached house built in 1869 which is sited within the grounds of the Istana in Singapore. During the island's colonial era, it served as the residence of the Chief Secretary. Since Singapore gained self-governance from the United Kingdom in 1959, the house has been the official residence of the Prime Minister of Singapore, though none of the prime ministers have ever lived there. Together with the Istana, it was gazetted a national monument on 14 February 1992.

== Name ==
The name of the house, Sri Temasek, means "splendour of Temasek" in Malay. The Malay word seri or sri means "charm; quintessence; splendour; glory" or a "cynosure" (something that attracts attention by its brilliancy or beauty; a centre of attraction, interest, or admiration) Temasek, which means "sea town" in Javanese, was the name of an early city on the site of modern Singapore. Today, it is used as an epithet for Singapore. The house was originally merely known as the official residence of the Colonial Secretary of the Straits Settlements (until 1942) Colonial Secretary of Singapore (until 1955) and Chief Secretary of Singapore (until 1959) and did not have its own name. When the State of Singapore was proclaimed and the first prime minister, Lee Kuan Yew assumed office in June 1959, after which the house, which had become the official residence of the Prime Minister, was officially named Sri Temasek, while Government House was officially renamed as the Istana, meaning "palace".

== Design ==
The construction of the Government House of Singapore and Sri Temasek was ordered by the Governor of the Straits Settlements, Sir Harry St. George Ord, after the original governor's residence had to be demolished in 1859 to make way for Fort Canning on the hill that bears its name. Sri Temasek was designed by John Frederick Adolphus McNair (1829–1910), a civil engineer who was appointed Executive Engineer and Superintendent of Convicts of the Straits Settlements, and built largely using Indian convict labour from Bencoolen. It was completed in 1869.

A 1,600 m^{2} (17,000 sq ft) two-storey detached house – often called a bungalow in Singapore – with European and Asian features, Sri Temasek has a symmetrical layout consisting of deep verandahs surrounding central living spaces. Notable architectural features include arches on its upper level, an intricate timber arcade with a mixture of eastern and western decorative motifs, and a Chinese moon gate (a circular gateway) on the building's second floor. Although few records exist concerning the moon gate's construction and usage, it is known to have made its appearance in the house in the 1960s and to have been designed and built by William Swaffield, a pre-World War II Comptroller of Government House and a professional furniture designer. It is constructed of chengal, teak and meranti wood. In the middle of the driveway in front of the house, there is a brick pit that was originally used by horse-drawn carriages. The house was gazetted together with the Istana as a national monument on 14 February 1992.

Sri Temasek was not used for a number of years and fell into disrepair. It then underwent restoration between 2006 and March 2008 by CPG Consultants under the supervision of architect Maureen Soh. As the original hand-crafted timber arches and railings on the first-storey verandah had been damaged by termites, replacements moulded from the originals made with an aluminium-cast alloy were used. Details on railings, doors and windows were restored, and several pintu pagar (traditional wooden half-doors) and wooden flooring reinstated. The former servants' quarters at the rear of the building were turned into a heritage gallery. The restoration works on Sri Temasek won the Urban Redevelopment Authority's Architectural Heritage Award in Category A (national monuments and fully conserved buildings) in 2008.

== Use ==
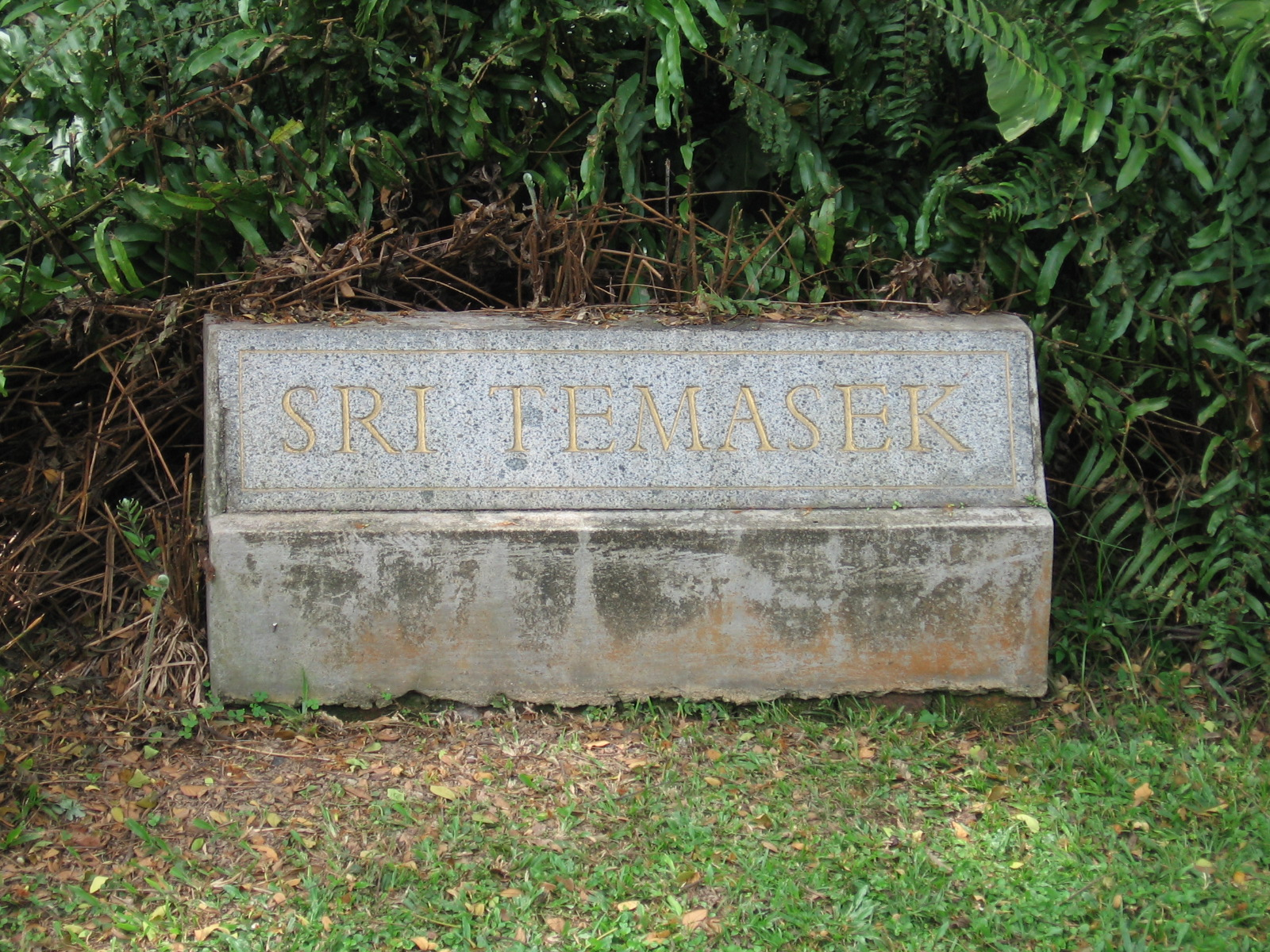
A stone plaque bearing the name Sri Temasek in the grounds of the Istana – photographed on 31 January 2006

When first built in 1869, Sri Temasek was the residence of the Colonial Secretary of the Straits Settlements (later Colonial Secretary/Chief Secretary of Singapore). All holders of the position had resided in Sri Temasek from 1869 to 1959. It is currently designated as the official residence of the Prime Minister of Singapore since 1959, though none of the past and present holders of the post, Lee Kuan Yew, Goh Chok Tong, Lee Hsien Loong and Lawrence Wong, have lived in it as a family home. In the 1998 book Lee Kuan Yew: The Man and His Ideas, Lee Kuan Yew said that when he became prime minister in 1959, he and his wife Kwa Geok Choo decided not to move into Sri Temasek with their three children, who were then aged seven, five and two, because the couple "did not want them to grow up in such grand surroundings with butlers and orderlies to fuss over their needs". The family did stay there in 1965 for a short time for security reasons when Singapore was expelled from Malaysia. Apart from that, according to a 2000 Straits Times interview with Kwa, the Lee children often played in the grounds of the house in the evening while their father played golf or made use of the practice tee and putting green.

Sri Temasek has been used mostly for official functions, particularly in the 1960s and 1970s. Prominent visitors included Tunku Abdul Rahman, the first Prime Minister of Malaysia; Spiro Agnew, the Vice-President of the United States; Indian Prime Minister Indira Gandhi; Denis Healey, British Defence Secretary; and King Hussein of Jordan. Sri Temasek was the venue for a party hosted in 1962 by Lee Kuan Yew to thank trade unionists and civil servants for their help with the referendum on Singapore joining Malaysia, and in 1983 the body of the late Minister for Finance Hon Sui Sen lay in state there. On 8 August 2008, Prime Minister Lee Hsien Loong delivered his National Day message from Sri Temasek for the first time. The wake for Madam Kwa Geok Choo, mother of Prime Minister Lee Hsien Loong and the wife of Singaporean statesman Lee Kuan Yew, was held at Sri Temasek in October 2010. In March 2015, a private family wake for Lee Kuan Yew was held there. Since 2024, Sri Temasek has been the working office of Prime Minister Lawrence Wong due to the ongoing renovations at The Istana.
