= Suffolk House, Penang =

Suffolk House
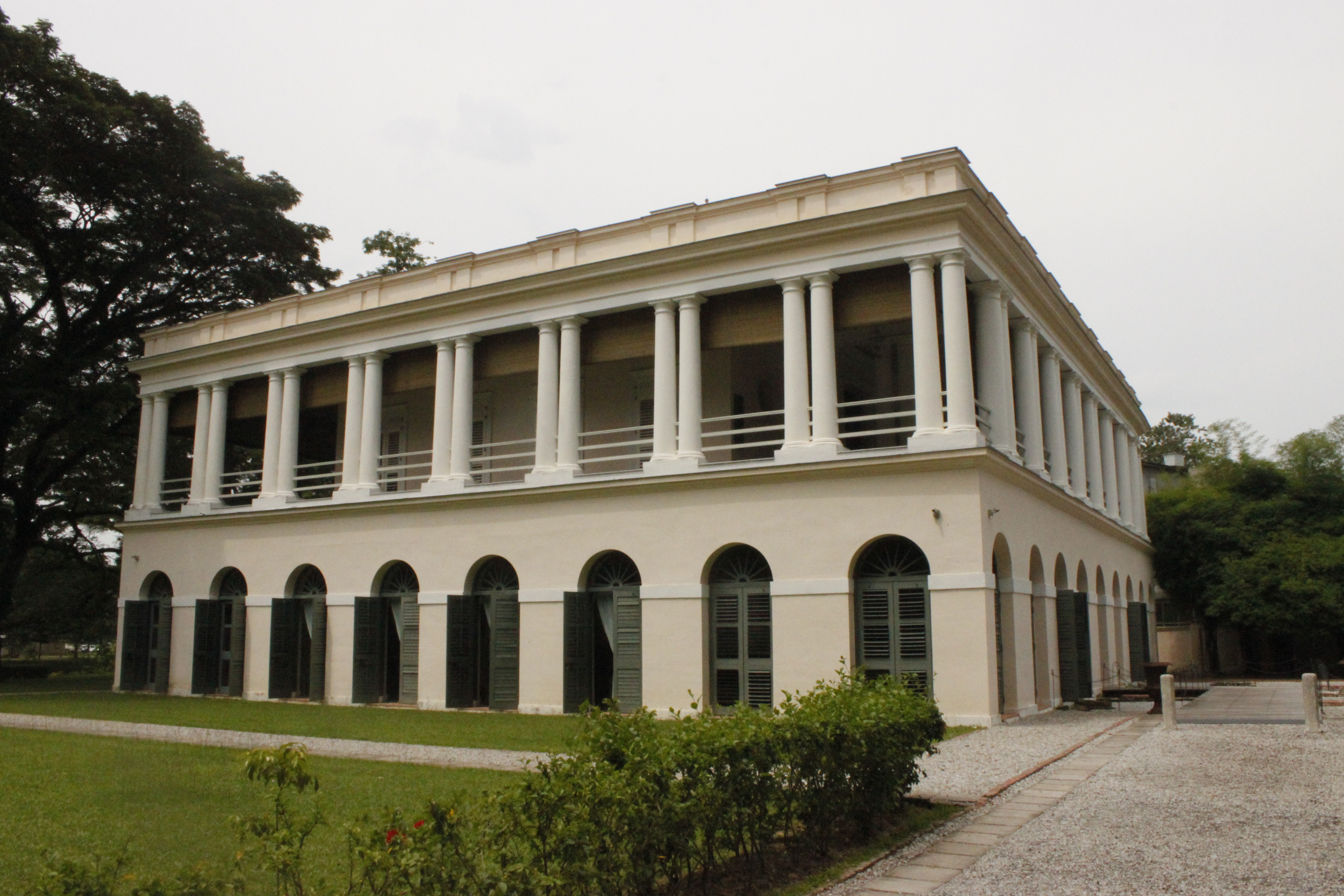

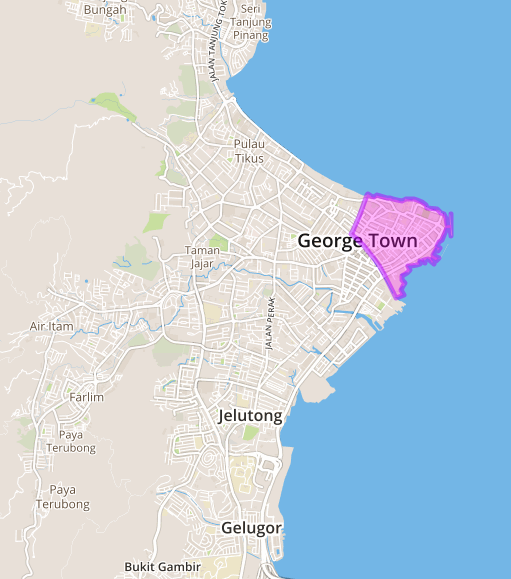
- Location within George Town

General information
- Type: Residence
- Architectural style: Georgian
- Location: 250 Air Itam Road, George Town, Penang, George Town, Penang, Malaysia
- Coordinates: 5.410743°N 100.305464°E
- Completed: 1809; 217 years ago

Website
- suffolkhouse.com.my

The Suffolk House refers to two early residences built on the same site located some four miles west of George Town, Penang, Malaysia. Located on the banks of the Air Itam ("Black Water") River, the earliest of the two buildings is notable for having served as the residence of Francis Light, the founder of the first British settlement on Penang. Following Light's death in 1794, and with Penang becoming the fourth presidency of India in 1805, a newer Suffolk House replaced the original house, assuming multiple roles before it was later neglected and subsequently restored.

== History ==
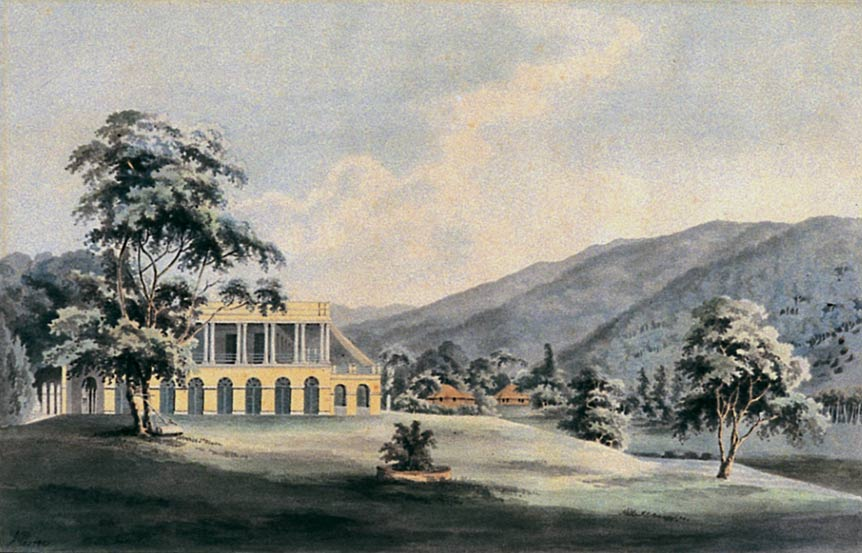
Suffolk House in 1811

=== As Light's residence ===
The original Suffolk House served as Francis Light's residence and has been described as a simple Anglo-Indian Garden House style of timber and attap construction, built within his pepper estate called Suffolk. Light lived on the estate until his death in 1794.

=== Service to Colonial Britain ===
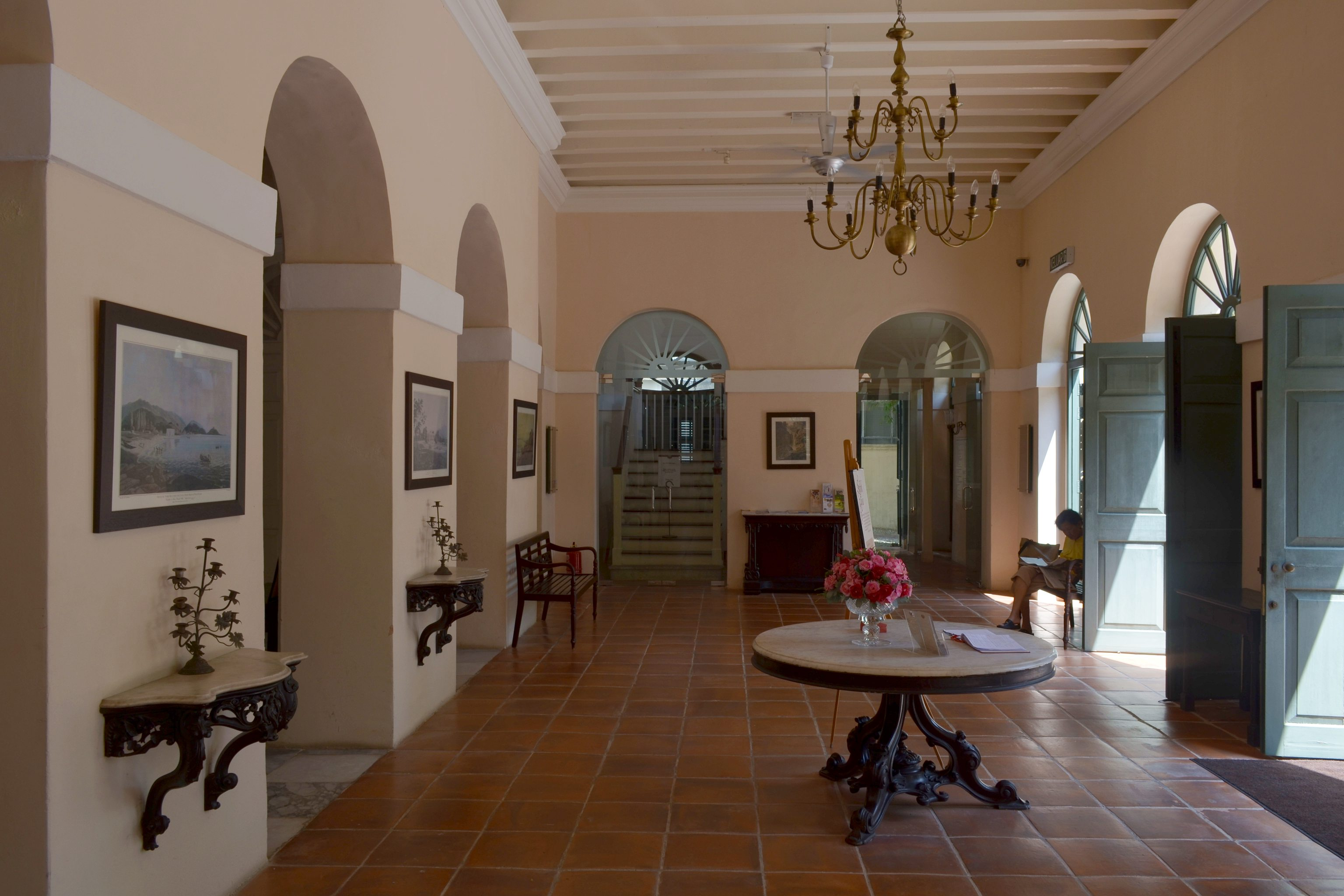
Entrance hall of Suffolk House.

On the purchase of the land from Light's estate in 1805, William Edward Phillips began the works of a Georgian-styled mansion called Suffolk Park. At the time of the mansion's construction, he was not the governor of the island, but later became the governor. Penang at the time, barely had 120 European residents, many of whom were trades people and merchants.

The mansion subsequently served as the residence of several more early governors for less than a quarter century, including William Edward Phillips' father-in-law, Governor Bannerman, amongst other Governors of Penang and the Governors of the Straits Settlements. The mansion also served as a venue for social and official functions.

During the 1810s and 1820s, the mansion was a Government House that assumed the role as a meeting place for critical political discussions, including, discussions with Stamford Raffles regarding the founding of Singapore.

=== Service to the Methodist Boys' School ===
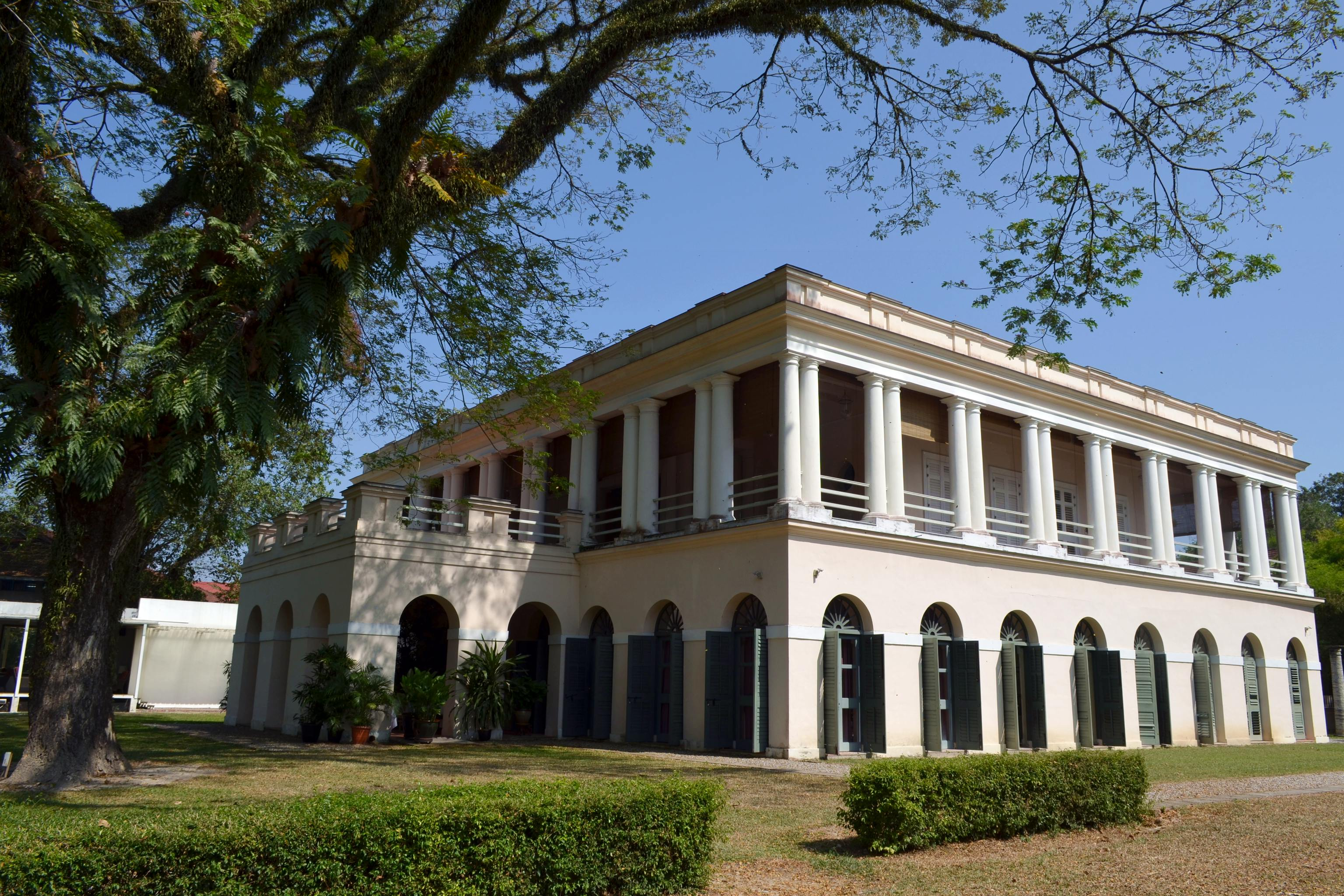
Suffolk House viewed from the northwest. The annexe is visible in the background.

The mansion remained in use as a governor's residence until the completion of The Residency in 1890, after which it was relegated to general government functions before being sold to Lim Cheng Teik. In 1928, Lim sold the building and land to Reverend P.L. Peach of the Methodist Church of Malaya for $40,000 (Straits Settlement dollars) for the purpose of housing the Anglo-Chinese High School, later to become the local Methodist Boys' School. A smaller school building containing 12 classrooms was built near the original north porch of the mansion in 1955. In 1956, the Methodist Church submitted plans to have Suffolk House demolished and to have new school buildings built over it. The President of the Municipal Council, John Sjovald Hoseason Cunnyngham-Brown, persuaded the school to retain the mansion but build on the rest of the land. The main school building and another wing was completed later in 1956.

The building assumed various roles through its 46 years of ownership by the Methodist Church. In 1931, Standard Six students were transferred into the building, before the entire Primary School (Standards 1–6) eventually moved into it in 1945. World War II saw the building temporarily occupied by the Japanese administration. A dental clinic was added into the building in 1953, and it also served as the Old Tuckshop (school canteen) until 1975. The building's rapid deterioration had been noted since the 1950s, and in 1975, the building was declared unsafe and vacated. Between then and its restoration in the 2000s, the building's roof and upper floor had collapsed.

=== Restoration ===
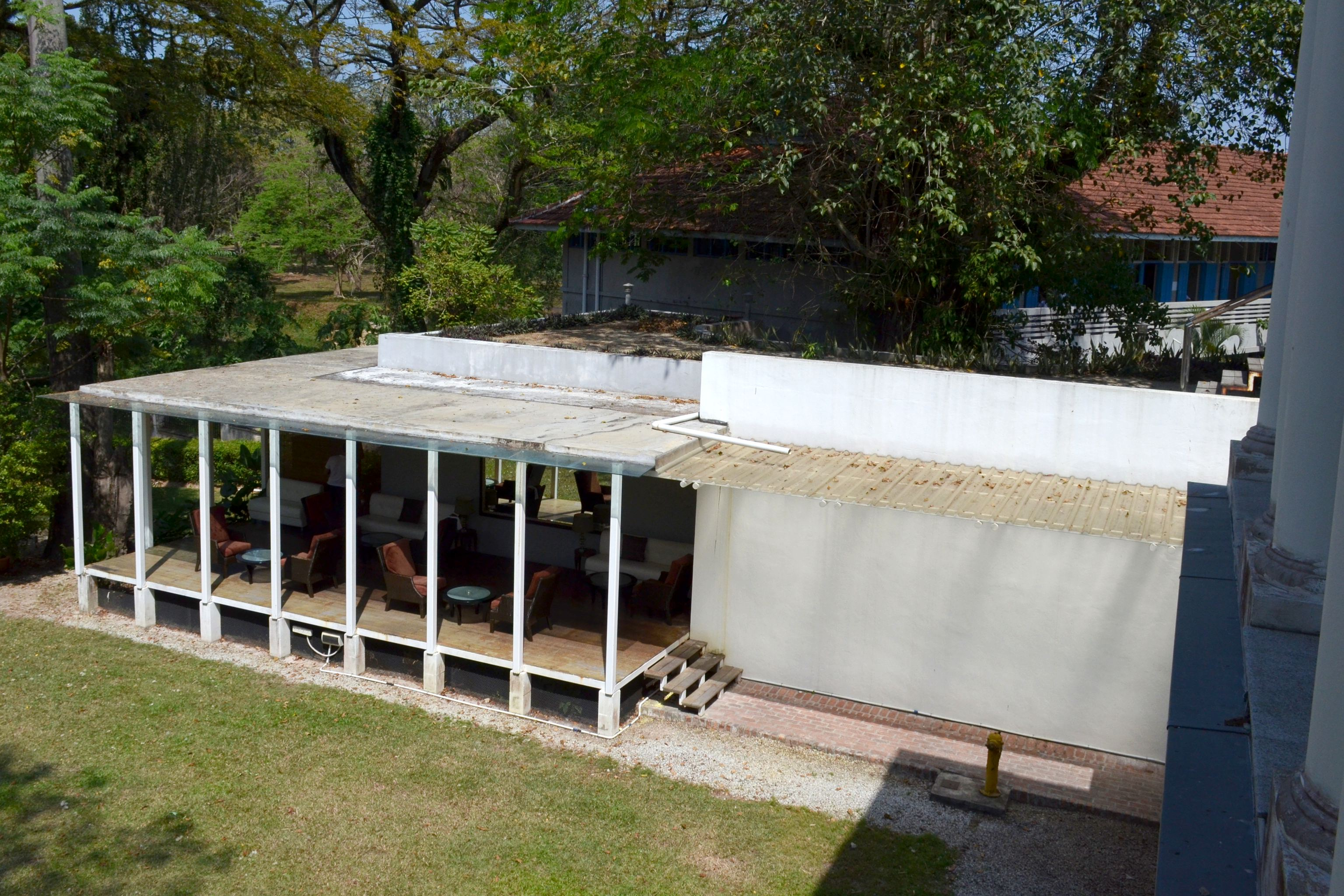
View of the modern annexe of Suffolk House with the Methodist Boys' School in the background.

Campaigning to restore the mansion has existed since 1961. Through the years, various efforts to restore the house were hampered by complications, including problematic land transfers and waning interest. In 1993, the Penang Heritage Trust conducted structural studies and stabilisation works on the buildings with assistance from the SACON Heritage Unit, an organisation based in South Australia (Adelaide, the capital of South Australia, was surveyed and laid out by Francis Light's son, William Light). The Suffolk House Committee was also formed by the Penang state government.

In 2000, the Methodist Boys' School was given a neighbouring plot of land from the state government in exchange for the land on which Suffolk House stood. Restoration work began in November 2000, but funds by the state government were only sufficient to provide stabilisation steel work, repair the central jack roof timbers over the ball room and retile the pitched jack roof. From 2004 onwards, rehabilitation work were aided by further state funding and donations from HSBC (of RM 2.5 million) and various parties. An estimated RM 5 million was needed to restore and refit the mansion.

=== Reopening to the public ===
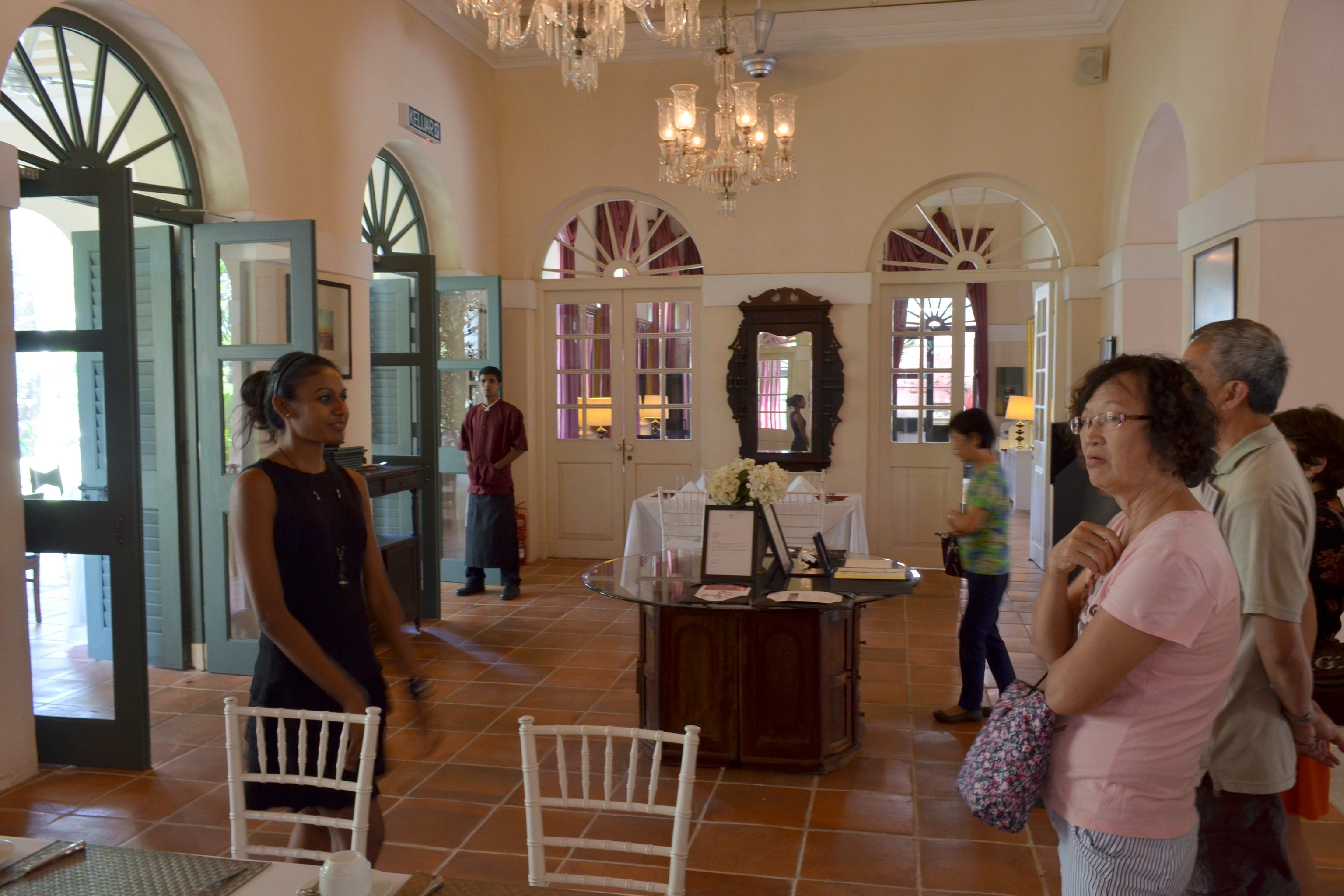
A tour group viewing the restaurant at the restored Suffolk House.

After years of anticipation, Suffolk House finally opened its doors to the public in 2009. The house is managed by the YKH Group of Restaurant under the supervision of Badan Warisan Malaysia, a non-government organisation, which is concerned with the conservation and preservation of Malaysia's built heritage.

The house and garden are open for public walkabout daily and guided tours are on offer.

== Dispute over construction and ownership ==
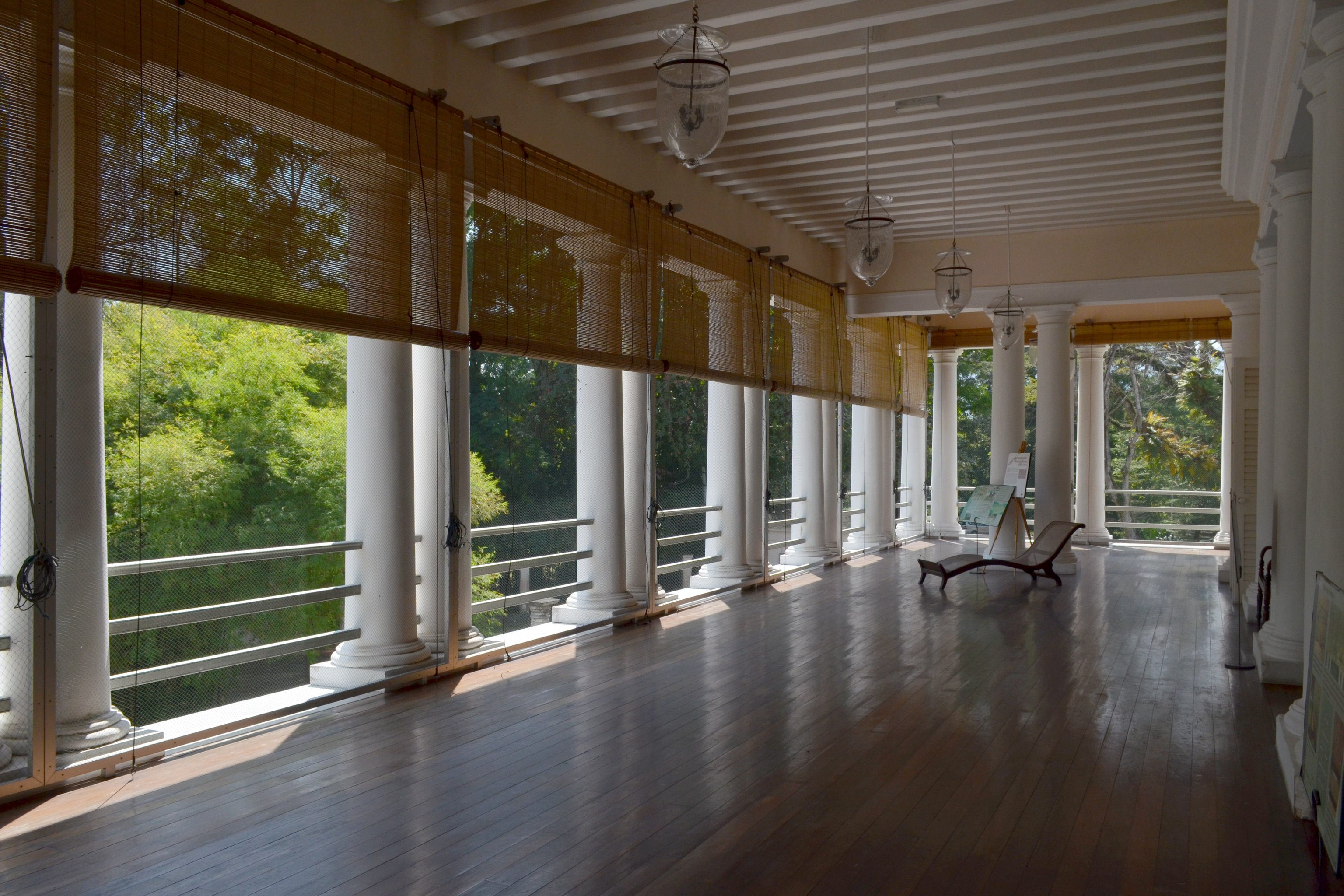
First-floor colonnade terrace at Suffolk House with modern netting installed.

The first owners of the Suffolk House remains has been disputed, as to whether the present house was built for Light or Phillips. Light's will indicates that he bequeathed his common-law wife, Martina Rozells, "...the pepper gardens with my garden house, plantations and all the land by me cleared in that part of this island called Suffolk...", which does not provide proof that his house resembled in any way the current Suffolk House.

Historian F. G. Stevens, one of the main authorities on the early development of Penang, pointed out in a 1929 article "A Contribution to the Early History of Prince of Wales Island" that the road leading to the house from Air Itam Road was only "lined out but not made" in 1807, discounting the possibility that the house could have been built before then.

Australian historian Marcus Langdon believes that Suffolk House was built by Phillips, who was also the owner of Strawberry Hill, on Penang Hill, and not David Brown.

== Architecture ==
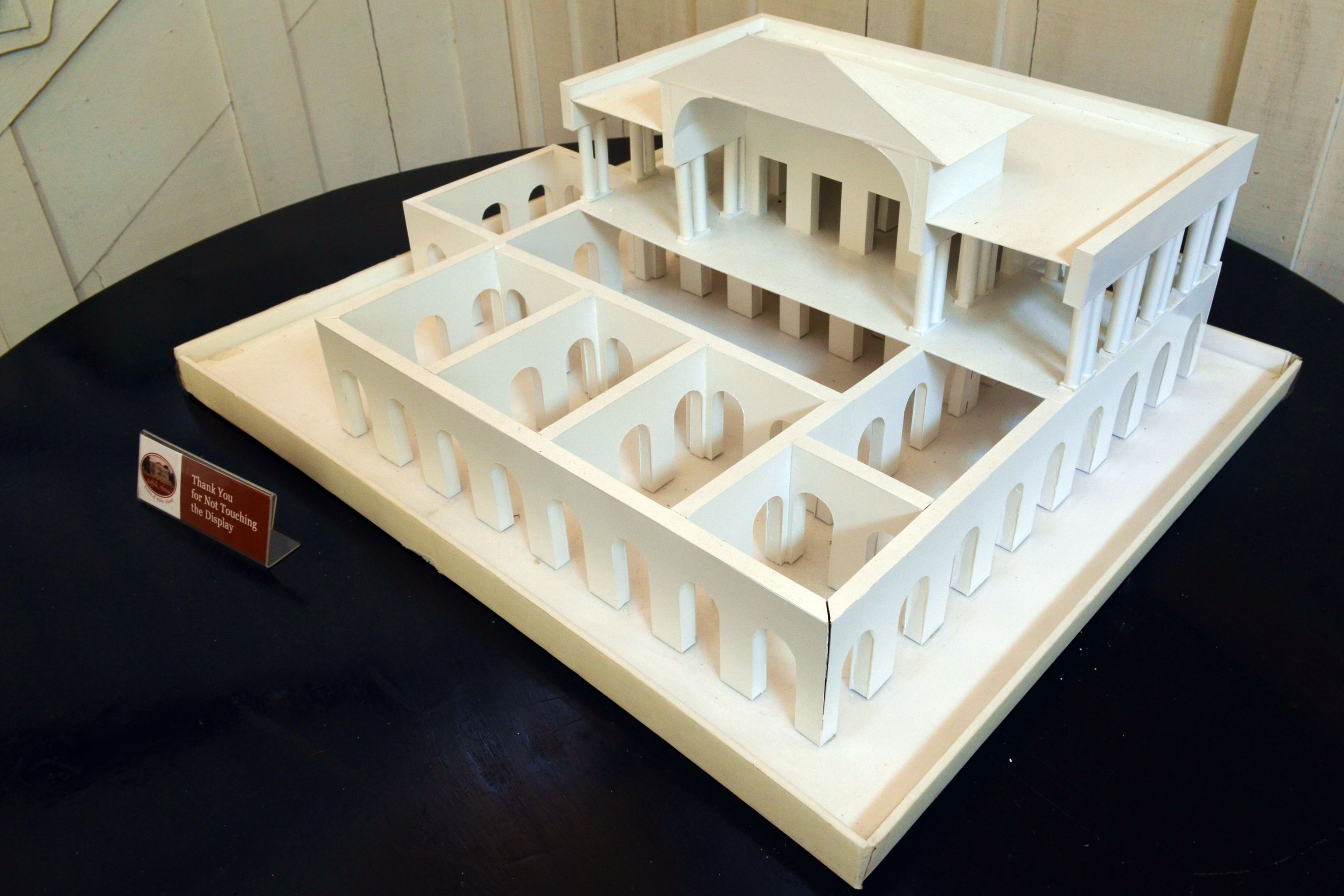
Cutaway model of Suffolk House.

The original house was simply a humble timber-and-attap garden house, fashioned in a simple Anglo-Indian Garden House style formerly common in British India. The current Suffolk House is a detached double-storey building of Euro-Indian Georgian styling.

== See also ==
- The Residency, successor to the Suffolk House.
- Similar British colonial residences in other regions:
  - The Istana in Singapore.
  - Governor's residence in Malacca.
  - Carcosa in Kuala Lumpur.
