= Methodist Boys' School, Penang =

Methodist Boys' National Secondary School
- Sekolah Menengah Kebangsaan (L) Methodist (Malay) 槟城美以美中学 (Simplified Chinese)

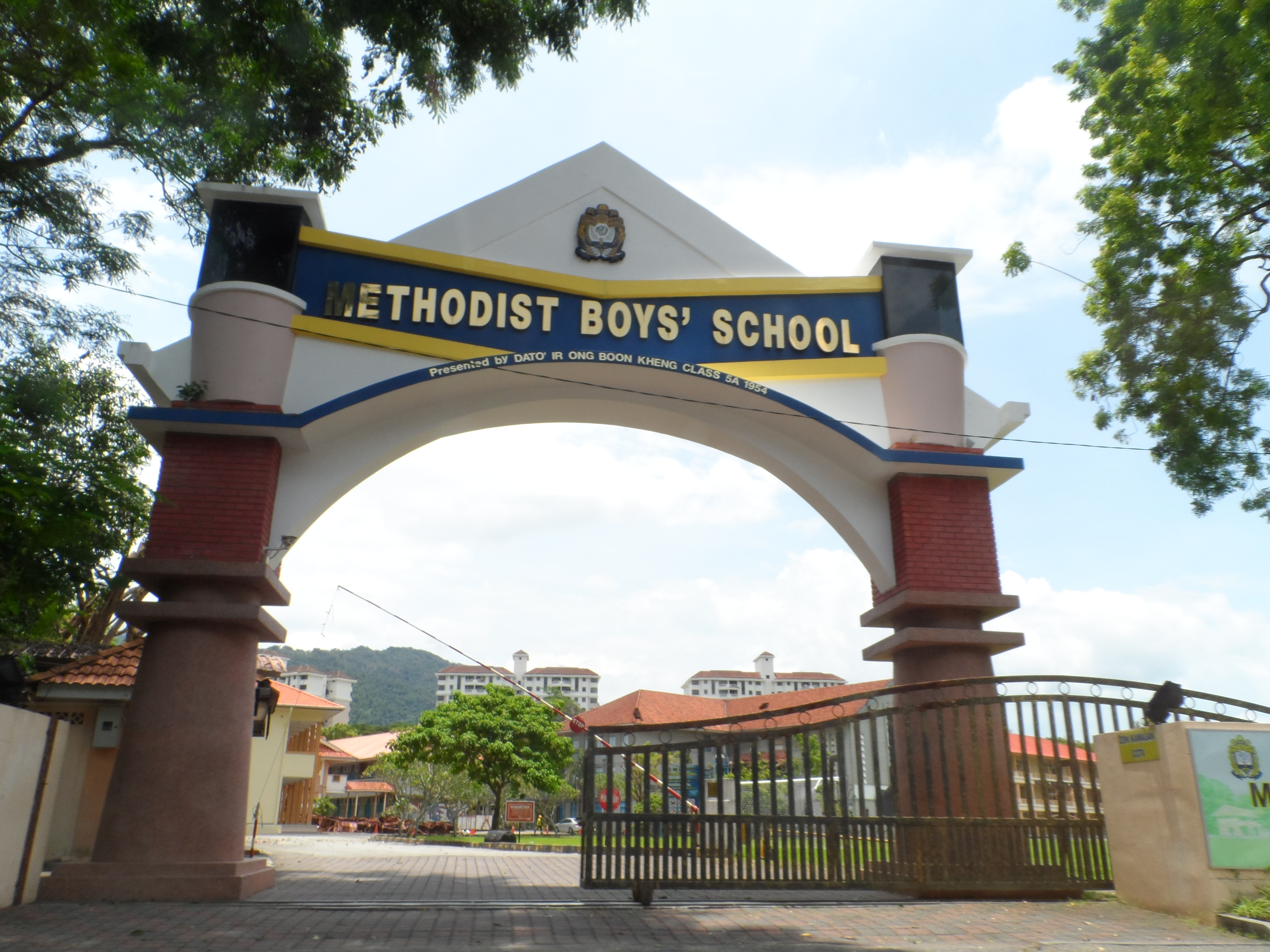

Location
- Air Itam Road, George Town, Penang, 10460; Malaysia; 5.410517°N 100.306413°E

Information
- Type: All-boys secondary school
- Motto: Whatsoever Things Are True
- Religious affiliation: Christian
- Denomination: Methodist
- Established: 1891; 135 years ago
- Founder: Rev. Benjamin H. Balderstone
- Principal: Sri Ram
- Grades: Forms 1 - 6
- Gender: Male; Co-educational (Form 6)
- Abbreviation: MBS

Methodist Boys' School, officially the Methodist Boys National Secondary School is an all-boys secondary school in George Town, Penang, Malaysia. It is one of the two secondary schools in George Town that were established by Methodists, the other being Methodist Girls' School.

Methodist Boys' School was founded in 1891 by a Methodist missionary, Rev. Benjamin H. Balderstone as the Anglo-Chinese School. This secondary school was only renamed Methodist Boys' School in the 1950s when the current school buildings at Air Itam Road were completed. While the school has been an all-boys school since its establishment, girls are now admitted for Form 6 as well.

Pykett Methodist Primary School in George Town also shares its origins with Methodist Boys' School; the primary school was formed at Pykett Avenue after the relocation of the secondary school to Air Itam Road. However, the primary school shut down in 2019 after years of dwindling intake.

== History ==
In 1891, Rev. Benjamin H. Balderstone, a Methodist missionary from Prince Edward Island, Canada, arrived in George Town as part of a two-man mission in Penang. He subsequently established the Anglo-Chinese School within a rented shophouse at Carnavon Street on 28 May, with an intake of only one student. At that point, the Anglo-Chinese School in George Town was the fourth Methodist school in British Malaya, following the founding of three Methodist schools in Singapore - Anglo-Chinese School, Methodist Girls' School and Anglo-Chinese Girls' School.

Rev. Balderstone was forced to resign in 1893 due to his faltering eyesight. He was replaced by Rev. George F. Pykett. By then, the school had expanded considerably, taking over five adjacent shophouses along Carnavon Street. However, as student enrollment continued increasing, even this expansion was inadequate. A purpose-built school building at Maxwell Road was subsequently completed in 1897.

Pykett played an instrumental role as the principal of the Anglo-Chinese School. It was due to his efforts that the school was held in high regard by Penang's Chinese community. Among his accomplishments, Pykett led a mission to Sumatra and set up Penang's first Scout troop in 1910. The school was also expanded twice to cope with the rising student enrolment; 10 shophouses along Penang Road were acquired, followed by the rental of a building at Chulia Street.

Therefore, by the time of Rev. Pykett's retirement in 1932, there were three branches of the Anglo-Chinese School - the primary school at Chulia Street, the middle school at Penang Road and the secondary school at Maxwell Road. Rev Pykett, who died shortly after his retirement, was succeeded by Rev. Preston L. Peach.

Rev. Peach had purchased Suffolk House and its surrounding land at Air Itam Road in 1929 for $40,000 (Straits dollar) to facilitate the school's expansion. A proposal to build a new school building at the site was deferred, however, with the onset of the Great Depression. Nonetheless, a sum of $6,000 (Straits dollar) was raised by the school committee to renovate Suffolk House. The primary school and the middle school, at Chulia Street and Penang Road respectively, were then moved into Suffolk House, which was also utilised as a canteen. Suffolk House served as part of the school until 1975, when it was deemed structurally unsafe and vacated; the colonial mansion has since been restored as a tourist attraction.

The current school building at Air Itam Road was only completed in 1955 and opened by Malcolm MacDonald, the then British Commissioner-General for Southeast Asia. The secondary school was relocated from Maxwell Road into the building and renamed Methodist Boys' School, while the primary school, named Pykett Methodist Primary School, was shifted out to Pykett Avenue.

== List of principals ==
The following is a list of the principals of Methodist Boys' School since its inception in 1891.

#	Name	Tenure
1	Rev. B.H. Balderstone, B.A.	1891–1893
2	Rev. G.F. Pykett	1893–1895
3	Rev. A.J. Amery	1896–1898
4	Rev. G.F. Pykett	1898–1908
5	Dr. H.L.E. Luering, PhD	1908
6	Rev. G.F. Pykett	1908–1914
7	Dr. J.R. Denyes, D.D.	1914–1916
8	Rev. B.J. Baughmann, M.A.	1917–1919
9	Rev. G.F. Pykett	1919–1920
10	Rev. P.L. Peach, M.M.E, M.A.	1921–1922
11	Rev. G.F. Pykett	1922–1927
12	Rev. P.L. Peach, M.M.E, M.A.	1927–1930
13	Rev. W.A, Schurr, M.A.	1931–1933
14	Miss E.S. Cass	1933
15	Rev. T.W. Bowmar	1933–1934
16	Dr. L. Proebstel, B.A., L.L.D	1934–1935
17	Rev. A. Eklund, B.A., B.D.	1935
18	Dr. L. Proebstel, B.A., L.L.D	1936–1938
19	Dr. H.H. Peterson, B.A., Ed.D.	1938
20	Dr. D.D. Chelliah	1937–1940
21	Mr. L.B. Jenkins, M.A	1939–1940
22	Rev. C.D. Patterson, MSc	1941
23	Rev. Fred David	1945
24	Miss E. Youngdahl, M.A.	1946
25	Rev. T. Runyan, M.A., B.D.	1947
26	Rev. P.H. Schumucker, B.A., B.D.	1948–1949
27	Rev. P.L. Peach, M.M.E, M.A.	1949
28	Dr. Ho Seng Ong, M.A. Ed.D.	1949–1952
29	Mr. Goh Kim Leong	1952–1953
30	Dr. H.H. Peterson, B.A., Ed.D.	1953–1956
31	Mr. Loo Choo Kheam, B.A. (Hons), A.I.E.D.	1956–1957
32	Dr. Cheah Bian Kung, MSc, PhD	1957–1958
33	Mr. Loo Choo Kheam, B.A. (Hons), A.I.E.D.	1958–1970
34	Mr. Tio Seng Hee, BSc, Sc.Dip.	1970–1971
35	Dr. Cheah Bian Kung, MSc, PhD	1971–1975
36	Mr. Arthur Khoo Hock Cheng, B.A. (Hons), Dip. Ed.	1976–1977
37	Mr. Yeong Siew Mun, BSc (Hons), Dip. Ed.	1977–1986
38	Mr. Lim Fong Juan, B.A. (Hons), Dip.Ed.	December 1986
39	Mr. Saw Yew Seen, BSc (Hons), Dip. Ed.	1987–1989
40	Mr. Lim Yeang Phai, P.J.K., B.A. (Hons), M.A. Dip.Ed.	1989–1994
41	Mr. Loo Hock Guan	1994 - 1999
42	Mr. Chin Wee Wah, B.A. (Hons), Dip.Ed.	1999
43	Mr. Choong Thean Chuan, B.A. (Hons), Dip.Ed.	1999–2001
44	Mr. Khor Hong Yin, P.J.K., BSc (Hons), Dip.Ed.	2003–2010
45	Mr. Gan Hua Beng, BSc (Hons), Dip.Ed.	2011-2014
46	Mr. Lau Chong Beng, BA (Hons)Ed., BA Jurisprudence (Hons), Masters in Public Administration	2015-2021
47	Mr. V. Petha Perumal	2021-2024
48	Mr. B. Sri Ram	2024-now

== Notable alumni ==
- Abdullah Ahmad Badawi - fifth Prime Minister of Malaysia
- Koh Tsu Koon - third Chief Minister of Penang
- Kalimullah Masheerul Hassan - prominent journalist, media executive and businessman
