= Maurice Cameron =

Cameron in 1918.

Sir Maurice Alexander Cameron (1855–1936) was a naval engineer and expert in submarine mining who spent nine years in the Straits Settlements and Malaya.

He took up the position of Deputy Colonial Engineer and Surveyor-General in Penang in December 1883 and oversaw the construction of roads and other public works in Penang and Province Wellesley. In 1888, he was appointed Colonial Engineer in Singapore and involved in the construction of forts for defence purposes. He served as the chairman of a commission to investigate Chinese and Indian indentured labour in Malaya from 1890.

Cameron returned to England in 1894 and worked at the Designs Branch of the War Office briefly before taking up the post of Third Crown Agent for the Colonies. He retired in 1920 as First Crown Agent.

In retirement, Cameron was involved in the Royal National Lifeboat Institution, joining its Committee of Management in 1921 and being elected vice-president in 1933.

Cameron was awarded the Order of St Michael and St George in 1900 and was promoted to knighthood in the order in 1914.

== Personal life ==
Cameron married Ethel Ancrum in 1894. They had three children together.
