= Scouting and Guiding in Malaysia =

The Scout and Guide Movement in Malaysia consists of

- Persatuan Pandu Puteri Malaysia, member of the World Association of Girl Guides and Girl Scouts.
- Persekutuan Pengakap Malaysia, member of the World Organization of the Scout Movement.

== International Scouting units in Malaysia ==
In addition, there is an international troop of Scouts in Kuala Lumpur, linked to the Direct Service branch of the Boy Scouts of America, which supports units around the world.

== History ==
Scouting in Malaya (now Malaysia) was first introduced in Penang in 1908 as an experimental troop in YMCA before spreading throughout the entire peninsula.

Some local Scout troops registered with The Boy Scouts Association of the United Kingdom which established a local branch, the Boy Scouts Association Malaya & Straits Settlement Branch which became defunct in 1957 when Persekutuan Budak-Budak Pengakap Malaysia (Federation of Malaya Boy Scouts Association) was formed. Persekutuan Budak-Budak Pengakap Malaysia was renamed the Persekutuan Pengakap Malaysia (Scouts Association of Malaysia).
