= The Residency, Penang =

Official residence of the Governor of Penang

The Residency
- Seri Mutiara
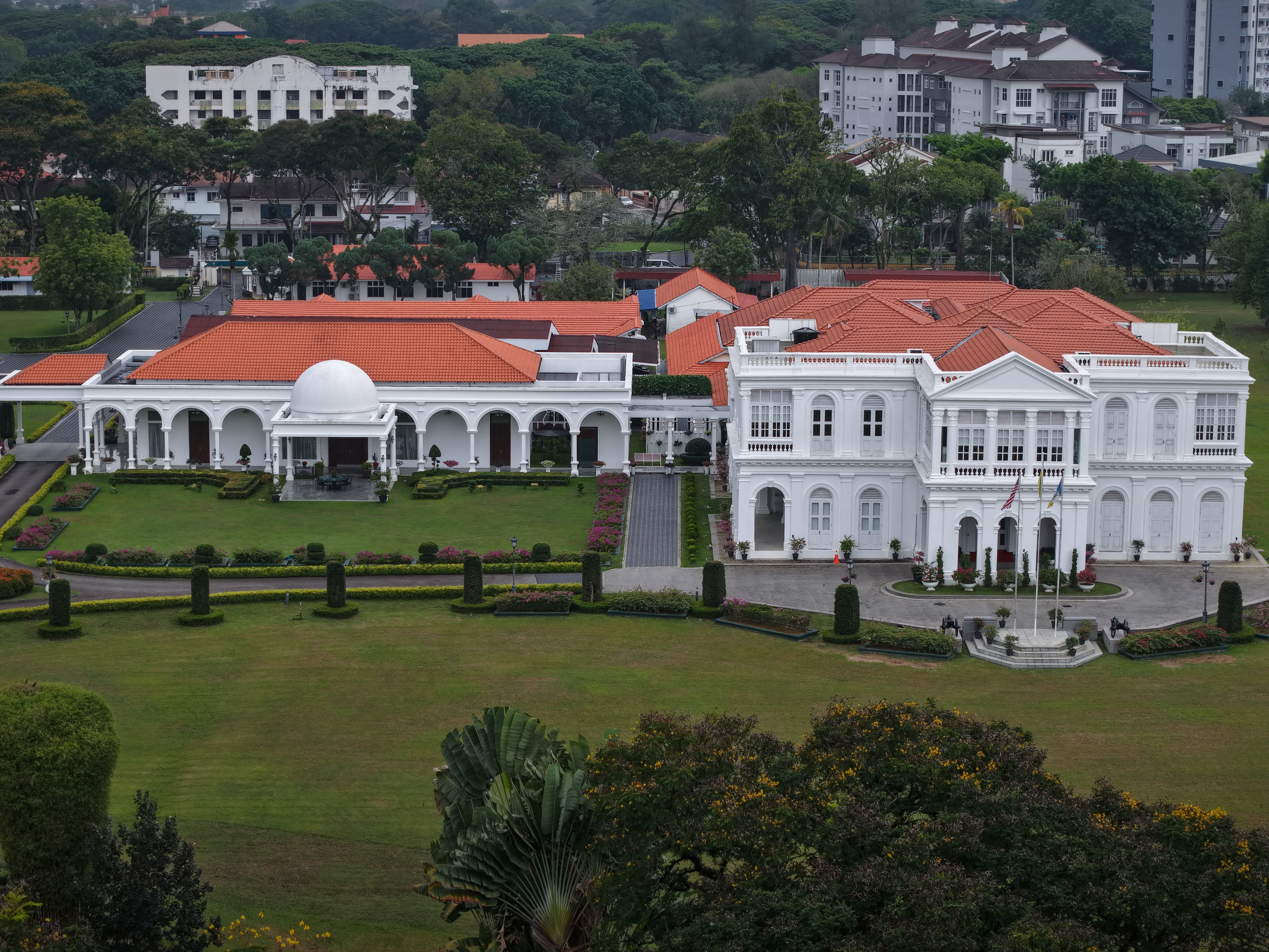

General information
- Type: Official residence
- Address: Western Road, George Town, Penang, Malaysia
- Town or city: George Town
- Country: Malaysia
- Coordinates: 5.41593°N 100.3069°E
- Current tenants: Governor of Penang
- Completed: 1890; 135 years ago
- Cost: $81,173
- Owner: Penang state government
- Grounds: 8.4 ha (21 acres)

Design and construction
- Architect(s): Maurice Cameron

The Residency, officially Seri Mutiara, is the official residence of the Governor of Penang. Located at Western Road within downtown George Town, it was originally built in 1890 by British engineer Maurice Cameron as the residence for the British governor of Penang. Following Malaya's independence in 1957, the mansion has continued to serve as the residence for the head of state of Penang.

== History ==
The Residency c. 1910

Prior to the construction of The Residency, Suffolk House was the official residence of the British governor of Penang. In 1886, during a visit to George Town, Straits Settlements Governor Frederick Weld participated in the selection of the site for the new Residency. The eventual site of the mansion encompasses an area of 8.4 ha (21 acres), bounded by Western, York and Ross roads.

Designed by British engineer Maurice Cameron, The Residency was completed in 1890. The original construction cost of the mansion was $48,000 (Straits dollar), but the final cost rose to $81,173 due to additional furnishings and electrification. Its architecture incorporates elements from contemporary buildings of the time, including a central tetrastyle portico and pediment reminiscent of the Town Hall. The verandah extends to the sides with a connection to the garden, similar to the Madras Garden House in India. The roof is concealed by a balustraded roofline. The first occupant of The Residency was Allan Maclean Skinner, the Resident Councillor of Penang and the highest-ranking British officer in the settlement.

Following the independence of Malaya in 1957, The Residency was renamed Seri Mutiara and retains its function as the official residence of Penang's head of state. Before Malaya gained independence, the mansion was accessible to visitors who were required to sign a guestbook at the entrance booth. However, since independence, access to Seri Mutiara has been restricted and the entrance booth has been replaced by a guardhouse.

== See also ==
- Seri Teratai
- Suffolk House
