= Geely Binyue =

Chinese subcompact crossover SUV

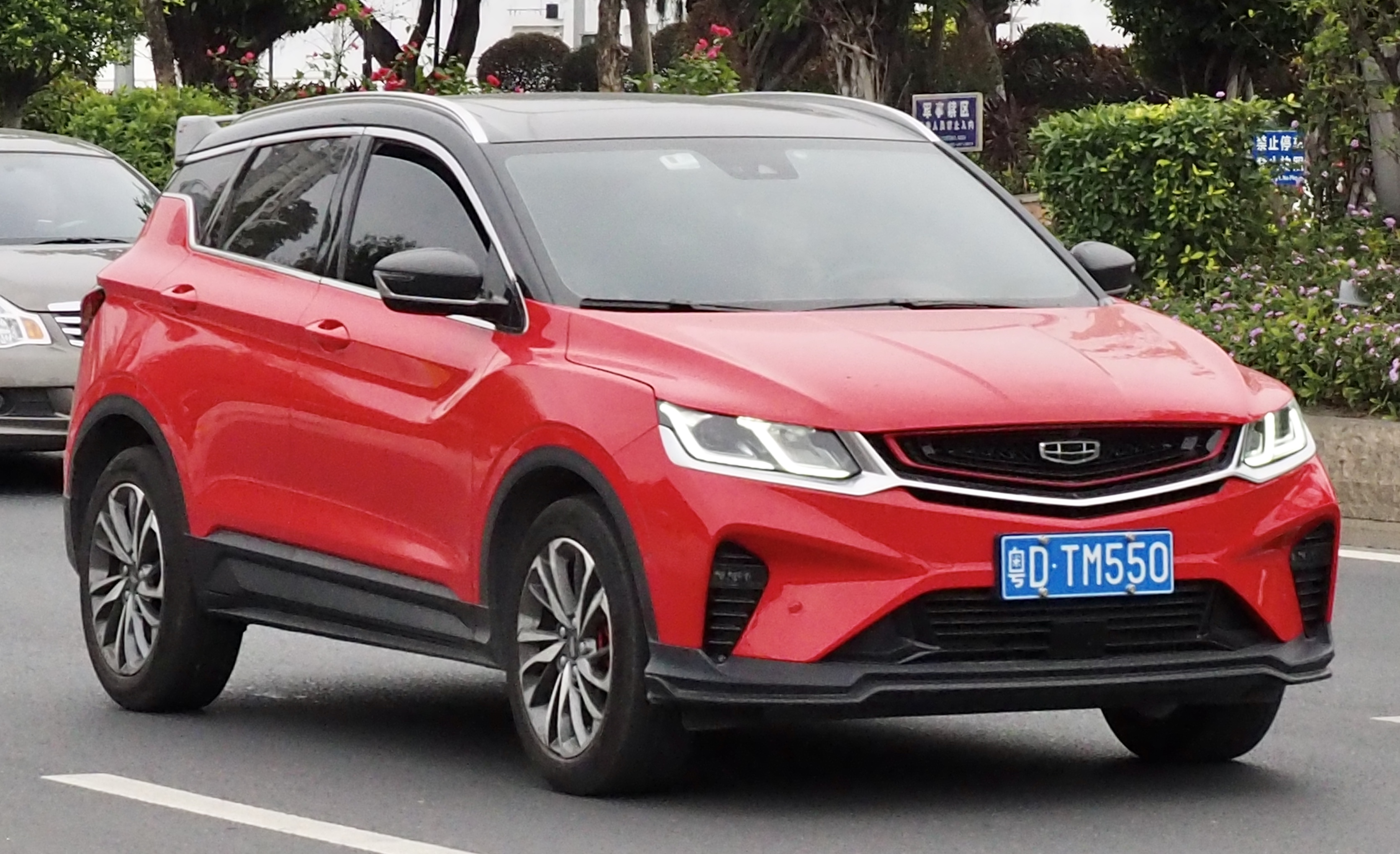
- Geely Binyue (pre-facelift)

Overview
- Manufacturer: Geely Auto
- Model code: SX11
- Also called: Geely Coolray; Proton X50 (Malaysia); BelGee X50 (Belarus and Russia, since 2023)
- Production: 2018–present 2020–present (Proton X50); 2023–present (BelGee X50)
- Assembly: China: Ningbo, Zhejiang; Malaysia: Tanjung Malim, Perak (PTMSB); Belarus: Zhodzina (BelGee)
- Designer: Jamie Barrett

Body and chassis
- Class: Subcompact SUV (B-segment)
- Body style: 5-door crossover SUV
- Layout: Front engine, front-wheel-drive
- Platform: Geely BMA platform
- Related: Geely Icon; Lynk & Co 06

Powertrain
- Engine: Petrol: 1.0 L I3 turbo; 1.4 L JLB-4G14T I4 turbo; 1.5 L BHE15-AFD I4; 1.5 L JLH-3G15TD I3 turbo; 1.5 L BHE15-EFZ I4 turbo; Petrol PHEV: 1.5 L B3154T5 I3 turbo PHEV
- Electric motor: 80 hp (60 kW; 81 PS) Permanent magnet synchronous (Binyue PHEV)
- Transmission: 6-speed manual 6-speed DCT; 7-speed DCT; CVT
- Hybrid drivetrain: PHEV
- Battery: 11.3 kWh lithium-ion (PHEV)

Dimensions
- Wheelbase: 2,600 mm (102.4 in)
- Length: 4,330–4,380 mm (170.5–172.4 in)
- Width: 1,800 mm (70.9 in)
- Height: 1,609 mm (63.3 in)

The Geely Binyue (Chinese: 吉利缤越; pinyin: Jílì Bīnyuè) is a subcompact SUV produced by Chinese auto manufacturer Geely Auto since 22 August 2018. It is sold in overseas markets as the Geely Coolray.

== Overview ==
The first generation Binyue was named "SX11" under development and was revealed in August 2018 as the Binyue. The Geely Binyue was positioned between the Geely Emgrand GS and the Geely Boyue within Geely's crossover portfolio, and is the first crossover based on the BMA platform. The Binyue 260T Sport Versions carry two unique "Geely Sport" logos, which are different from the former "Earth" Logo.

The initial engine options available for the Binyue are a 1.0-litre three-cylinder turbo engine with 136 hp (101 kW; 138 PS) and a 1.5-litre turbo inline-three engine with 177 hp (132 kW; 179 PS).

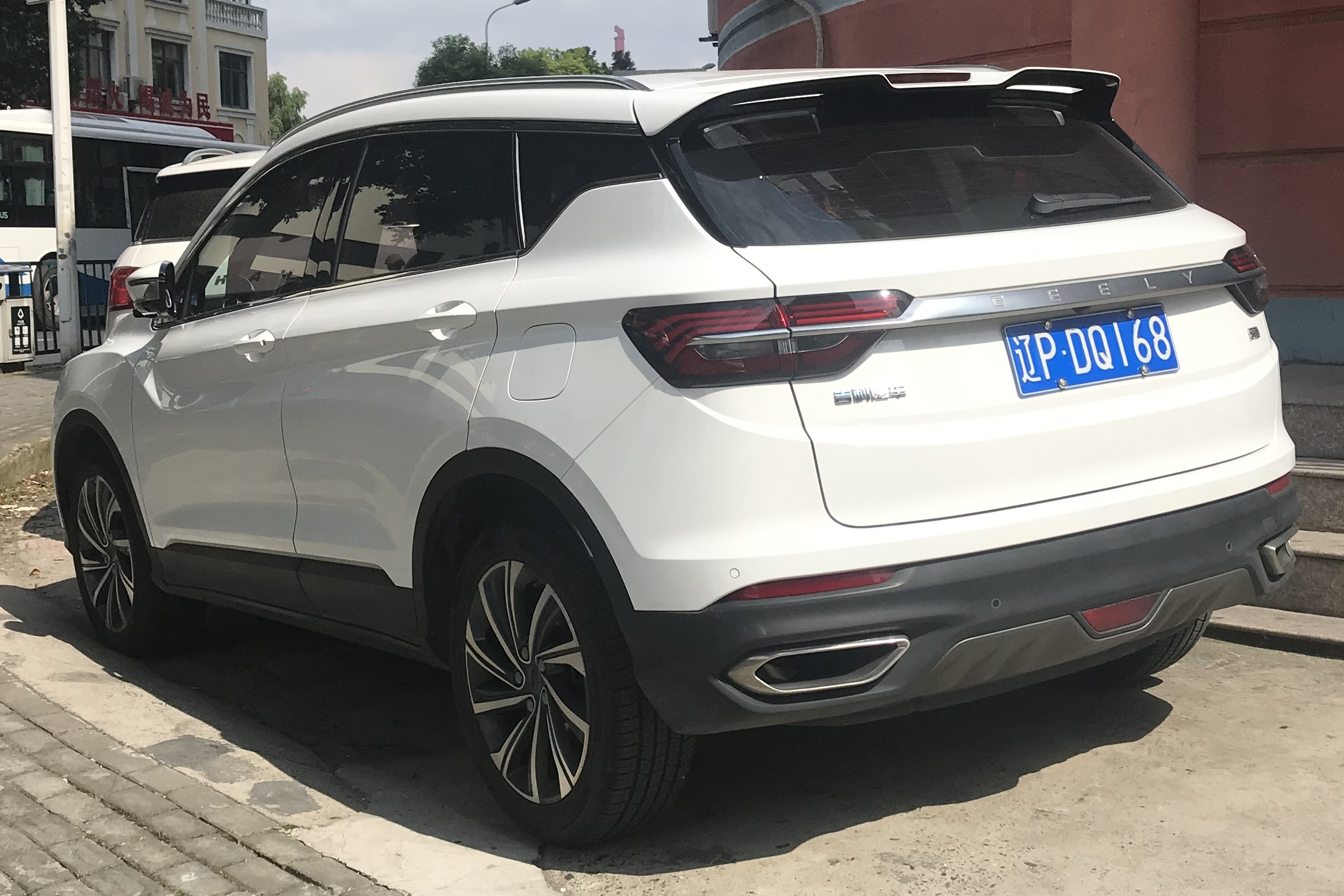
Rear view (pre-facelift)

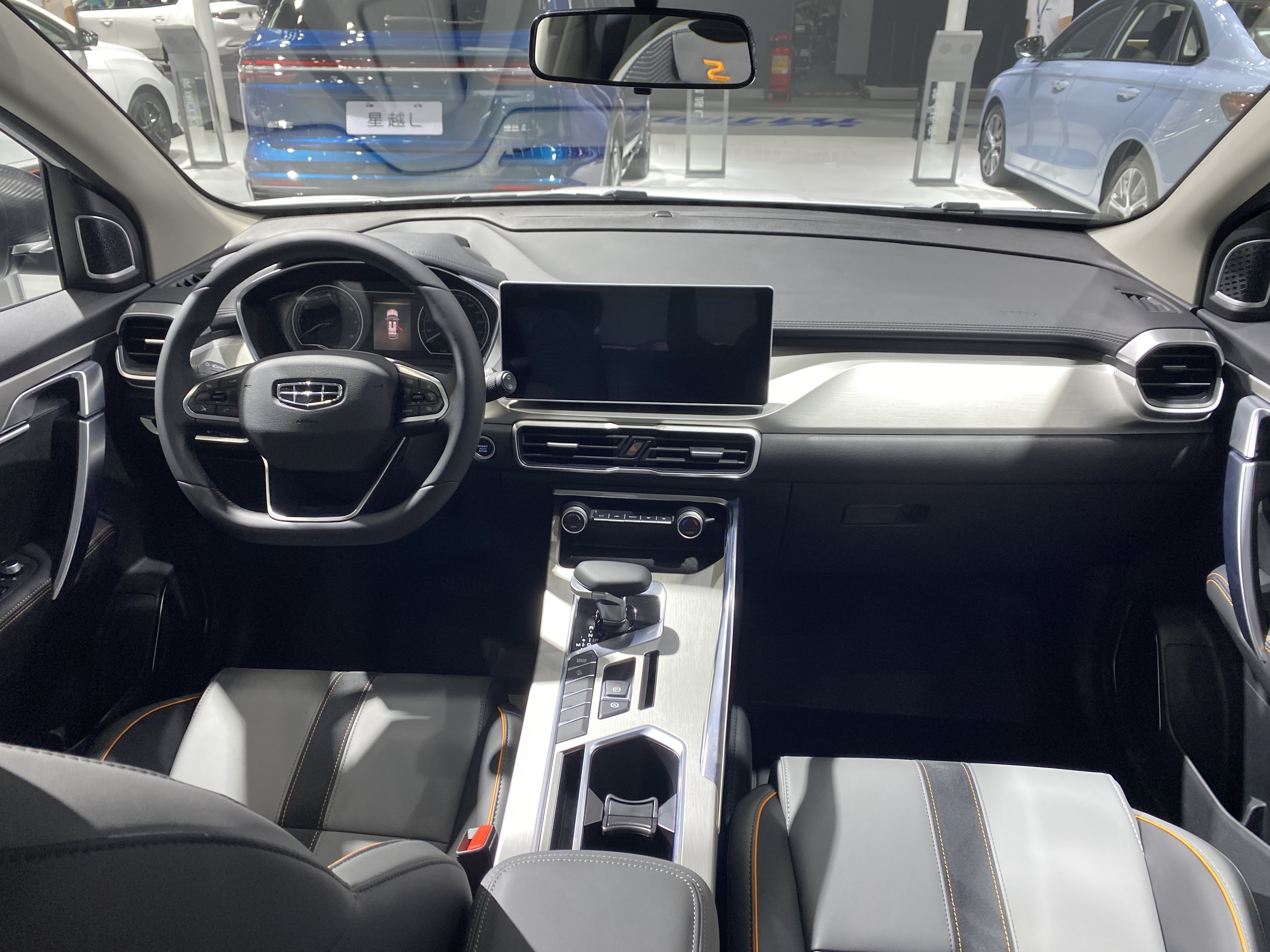
Interior (pre-facelift)

=== Binyue PHEV ===
The Binyue PHEV is the plug-in hybrid version of the standard Binyue. It is powered by a 1.5-litre turbocharged engine mated to an electric motor and an 11.3 kWh lithium battery pack producing 258 PS (190 kW; 254 hp) and 415 N⋅m (306 lb⋅ft; 42.3 kg⋅m) of torque. The Binyue PHEV has around 62 kilometres (39 mi) of range in pure electric mode.

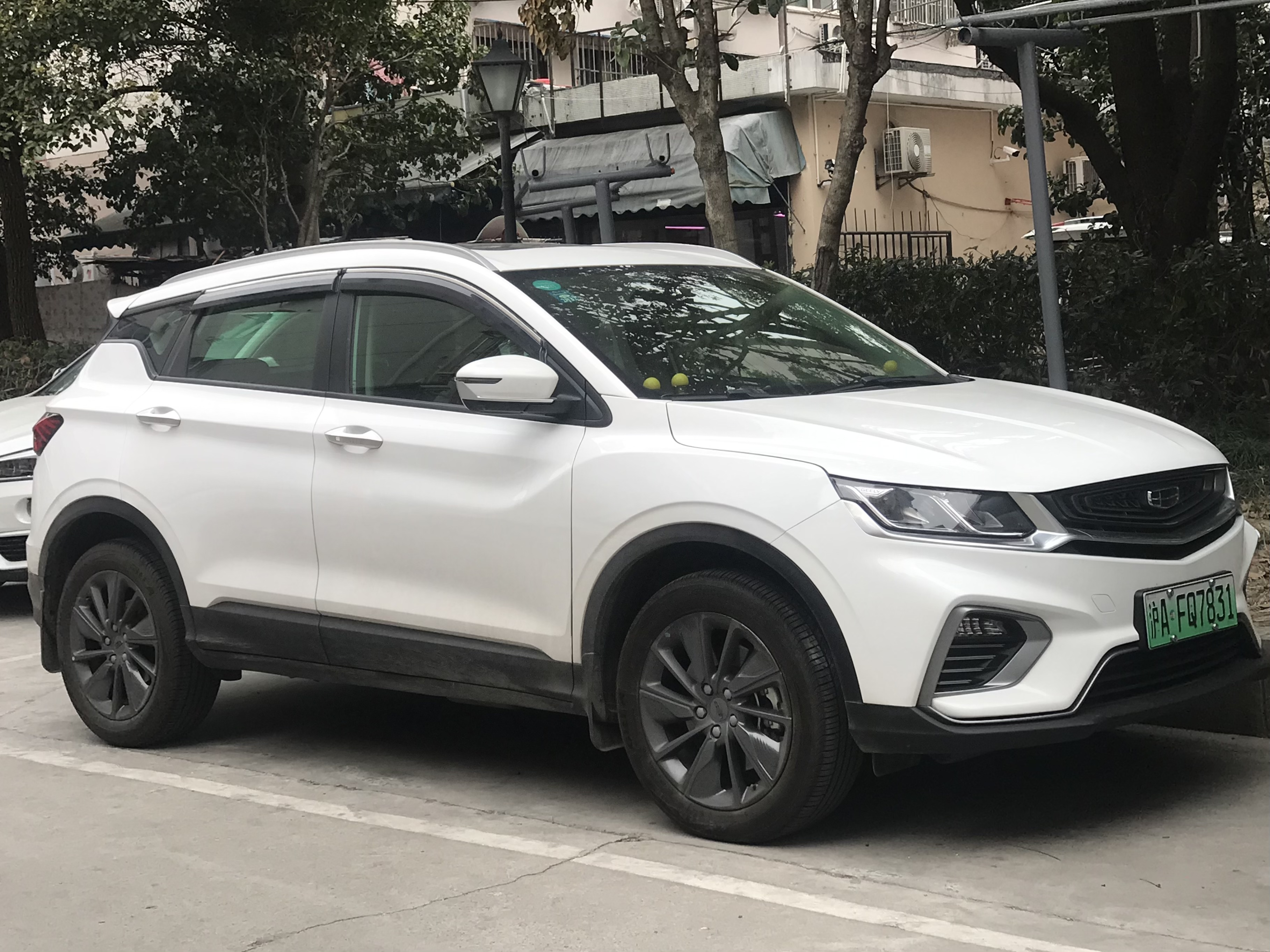
Front view (pre-facelift)

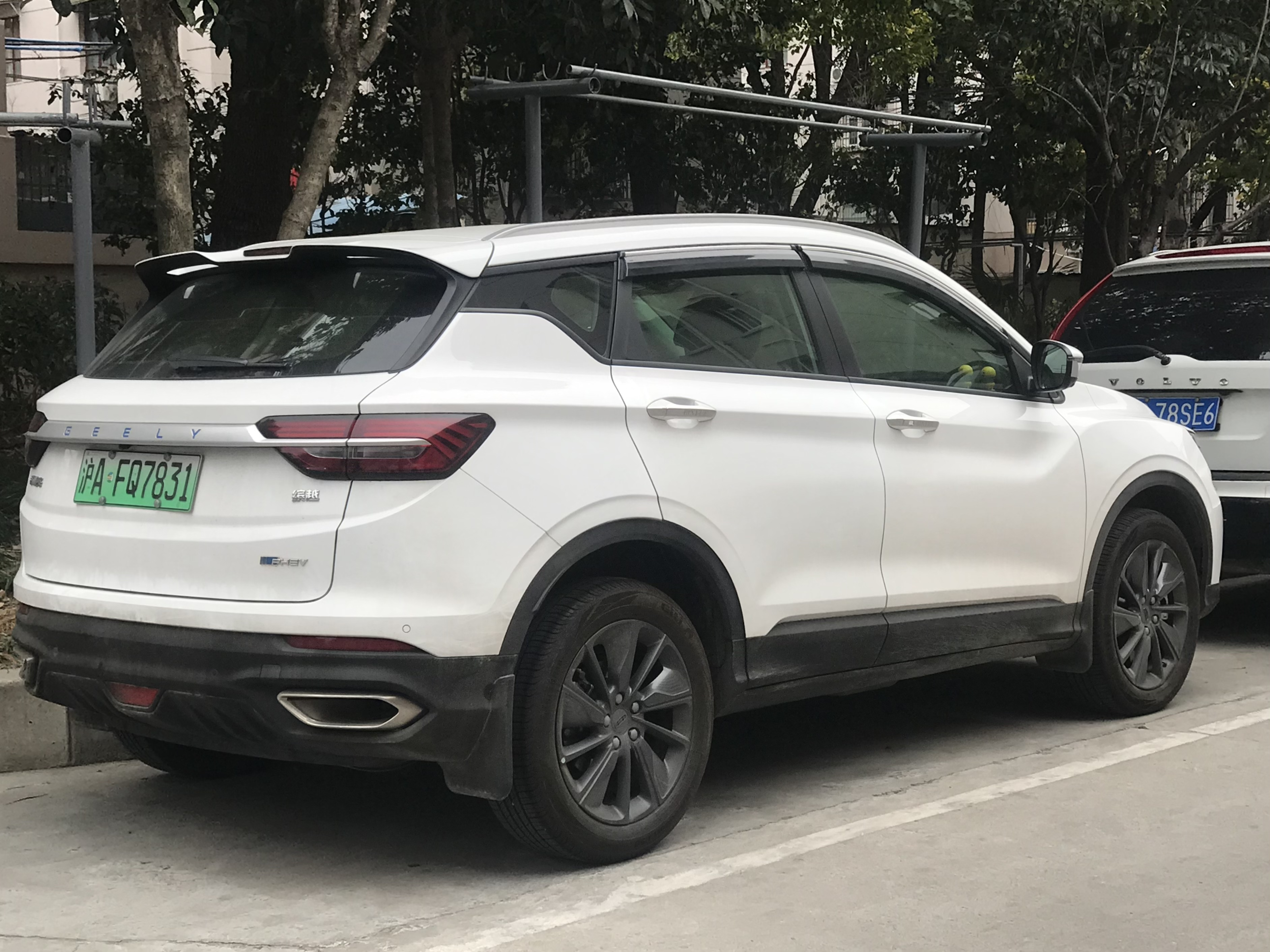
Rear view (pre-facelift)

=== 2021 sports appearance package ===
A sports appearance package was added for the 2021 model year and launched in August 2021, featuring restyled front bumper and aero kit with a roof spoiler. The interior remains largely the same as previous model years and powertrain remains the same as the regular model.

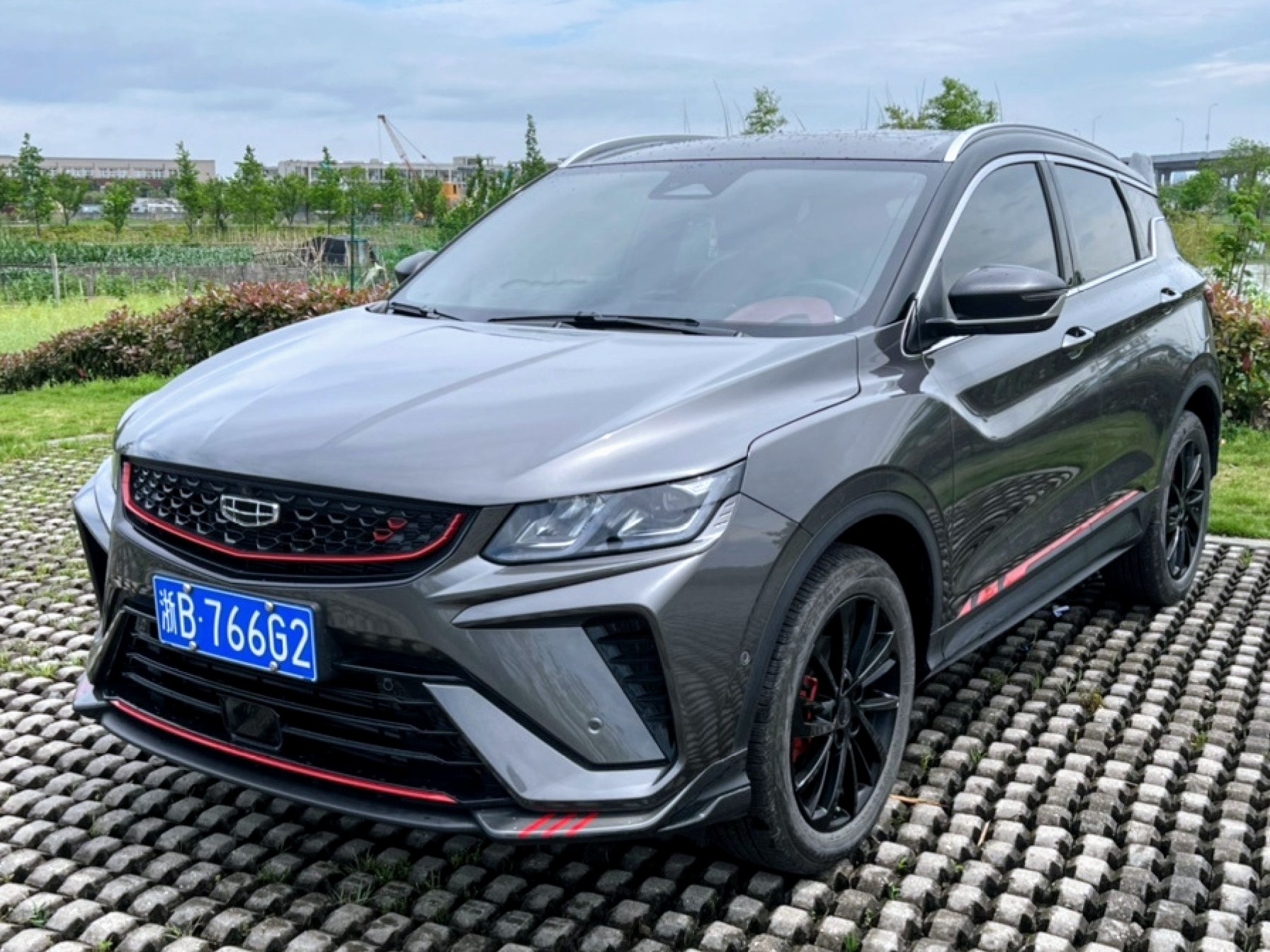
Front view (first facelift)

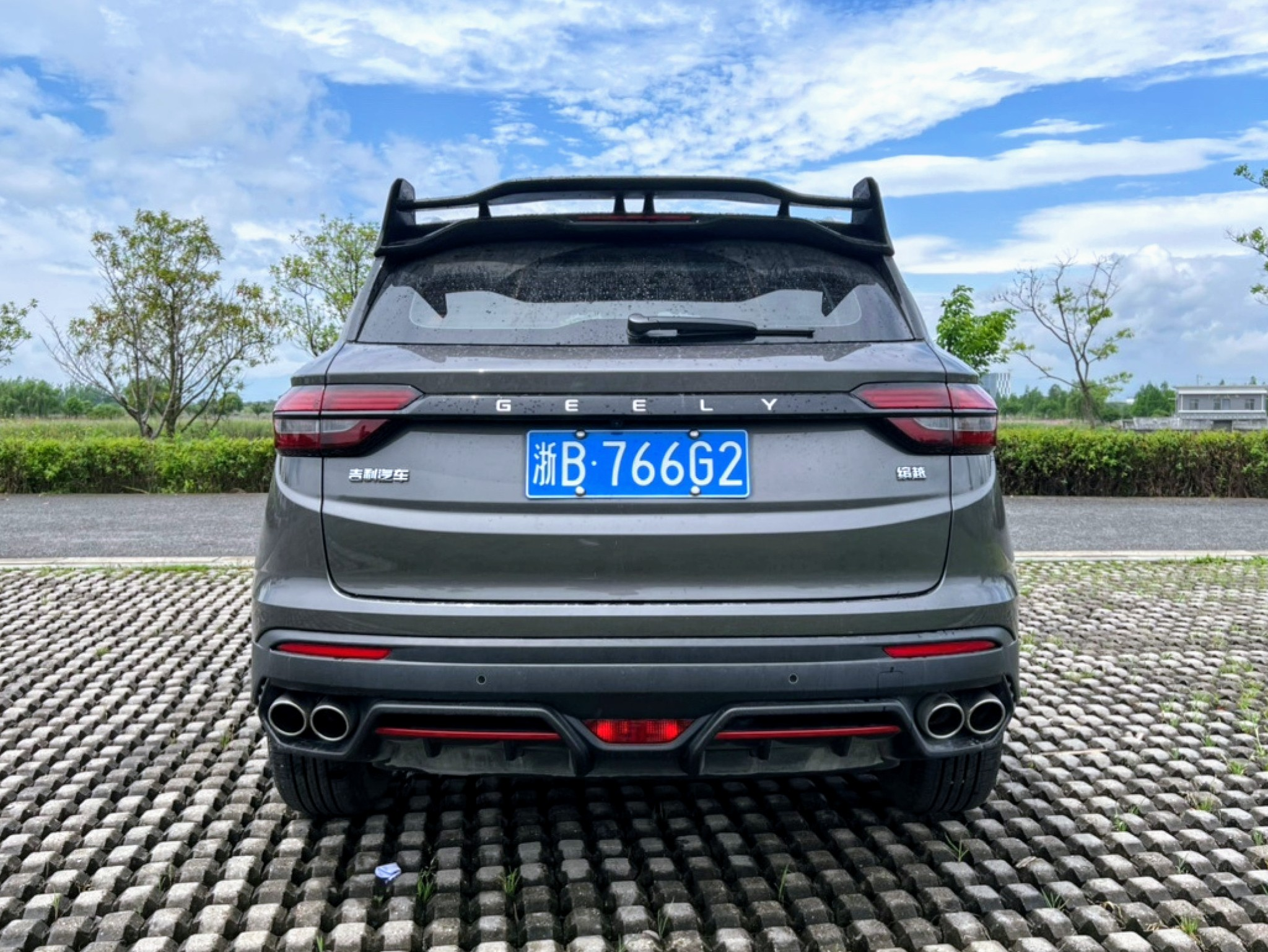
Rear view (first facelift)

=== 2023 model year update ===
The standard Binyue received another update in May 2023 as a more affordable alternative to the Binyue Cool. The update received revised trims and a restyled front grilles. The powertrain is a 1.5-liter turbocharged inline-4 engine developing a maximum output of 181 hp (135 kW; 184 PS) and 290 N⋅m (214 lb⋅ft; 29.6 kg⋅m) mated to a 7-speed wet style dual-clutch transmission.

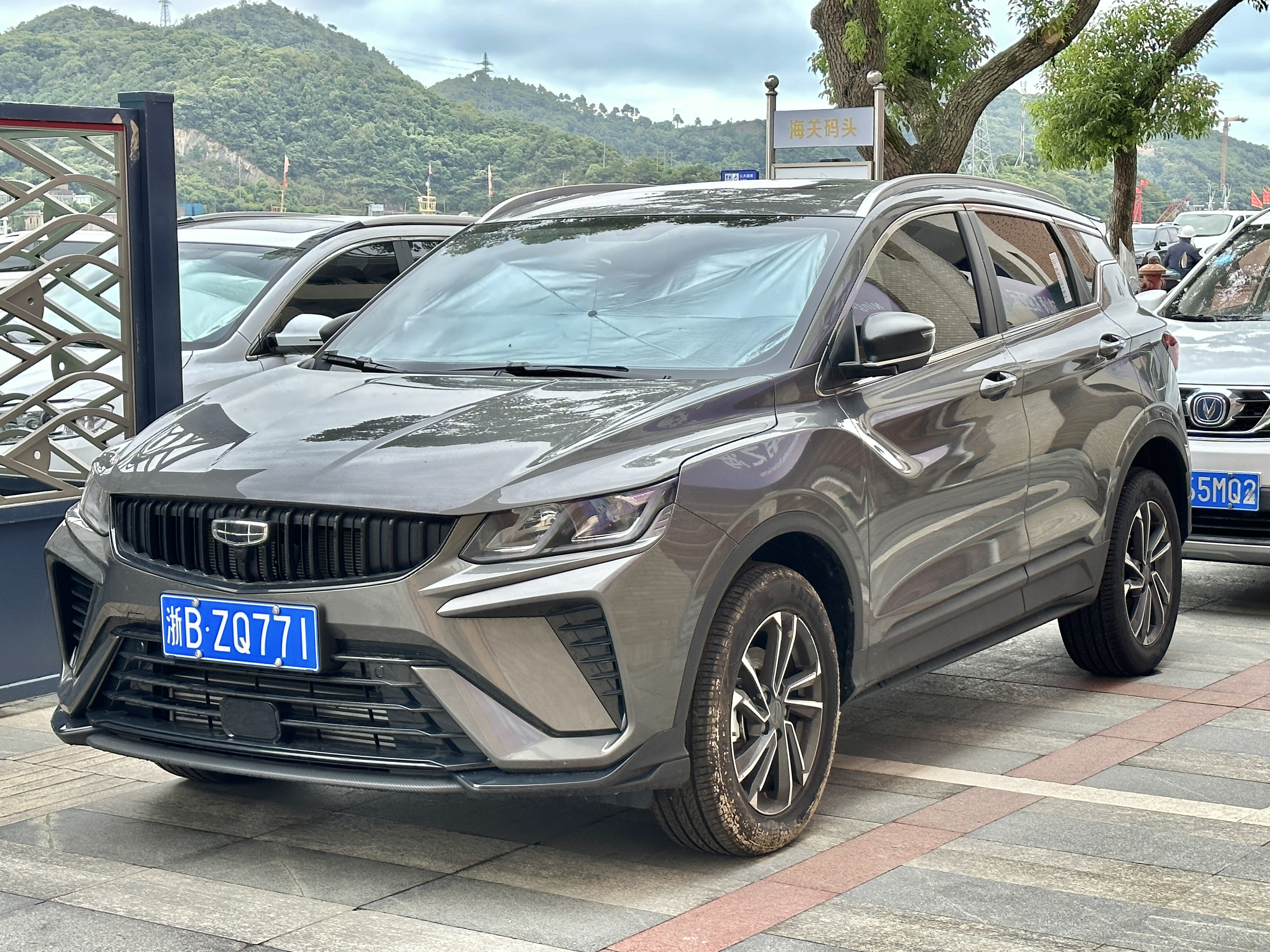
Front view (second facelift)

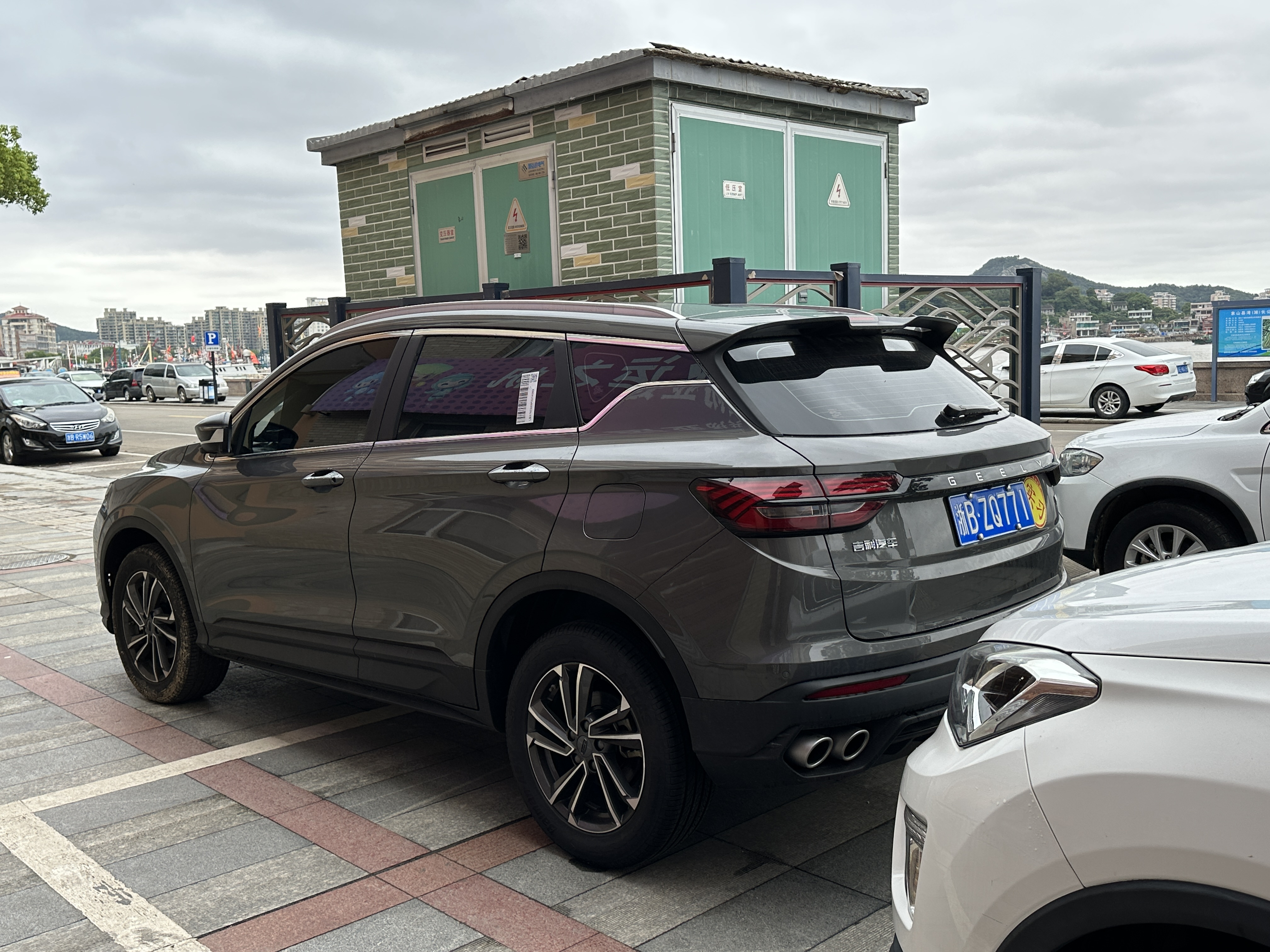
Rear view (second facelift)

=== 2027 model year update ===
A facelift update of the original Binyue for the 2027 model year was launched in October 2026 in the Chinese market, dubbed the superpower Edition.

== Binyue Cool ==
A major updated variant of the Binyue was launched in 2022 as the Binyue Cool, featuring redesigns in the front clip and rear end. The updated model was sold alongside the original Binyue and features Geely’s "Vision Starburst" design language and the updated front and rear end designs adds 50 mm (2.0 in) to the vehicle length.

The Binyue Cool is equipped with Geely’s Jinqing 1.5-litre inline-4 TD high-pressure direct injection engine with a maximum power of 181 hp (135 kW; 184 PS) and a maximum torque of 290 N⋅m (214 lb⋅ft; 29.6 kg⋅m). Its 0 to 100 km/h (0 to 62 mph) acceleration time is rated at 7.6 seconds, and fuel consumption is rated at 5.8 litres per 100 kilometres (49 mpg_{‑imp}; 41 mpg_{‑US}).

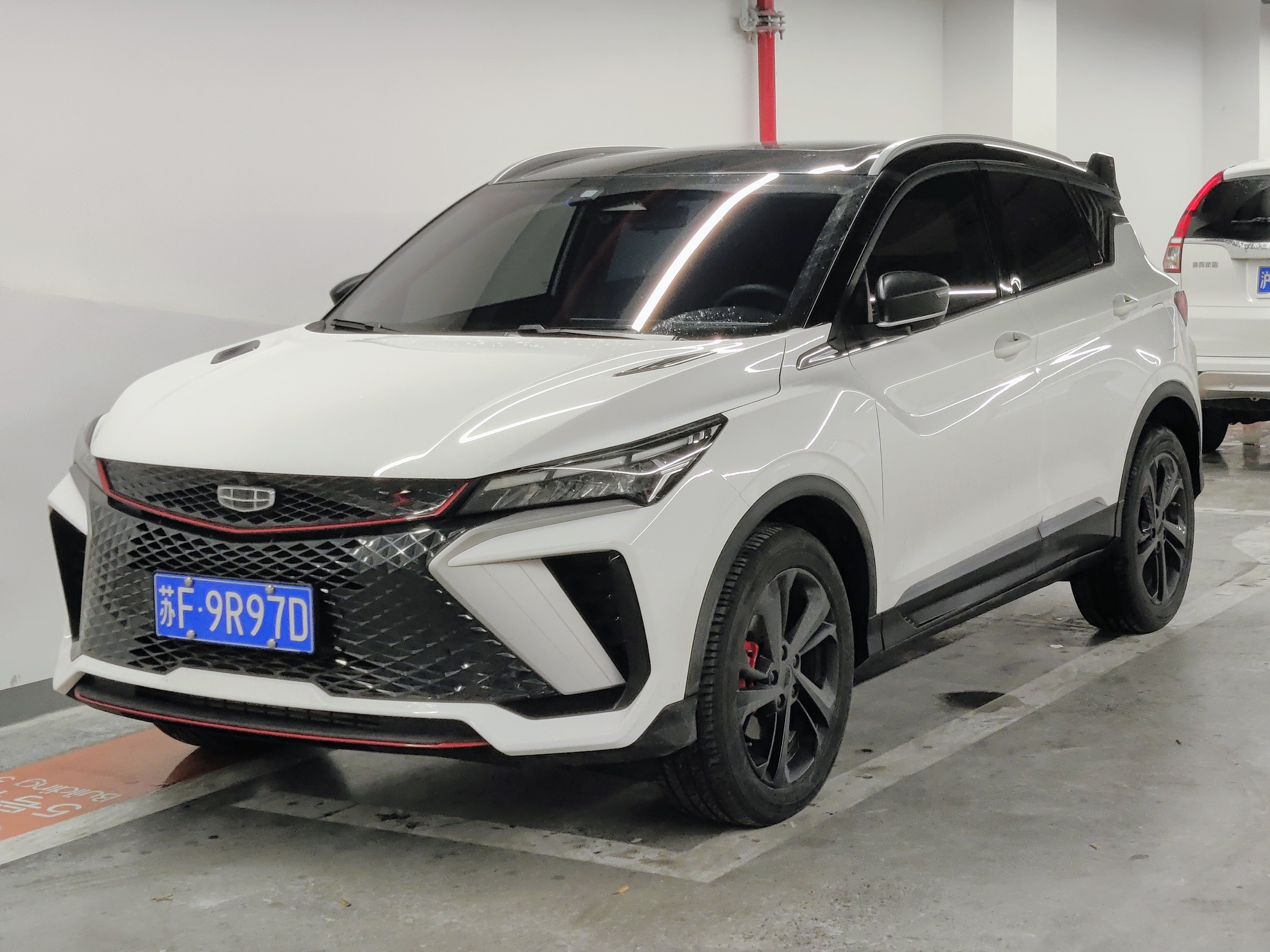
Front view (first facelift)

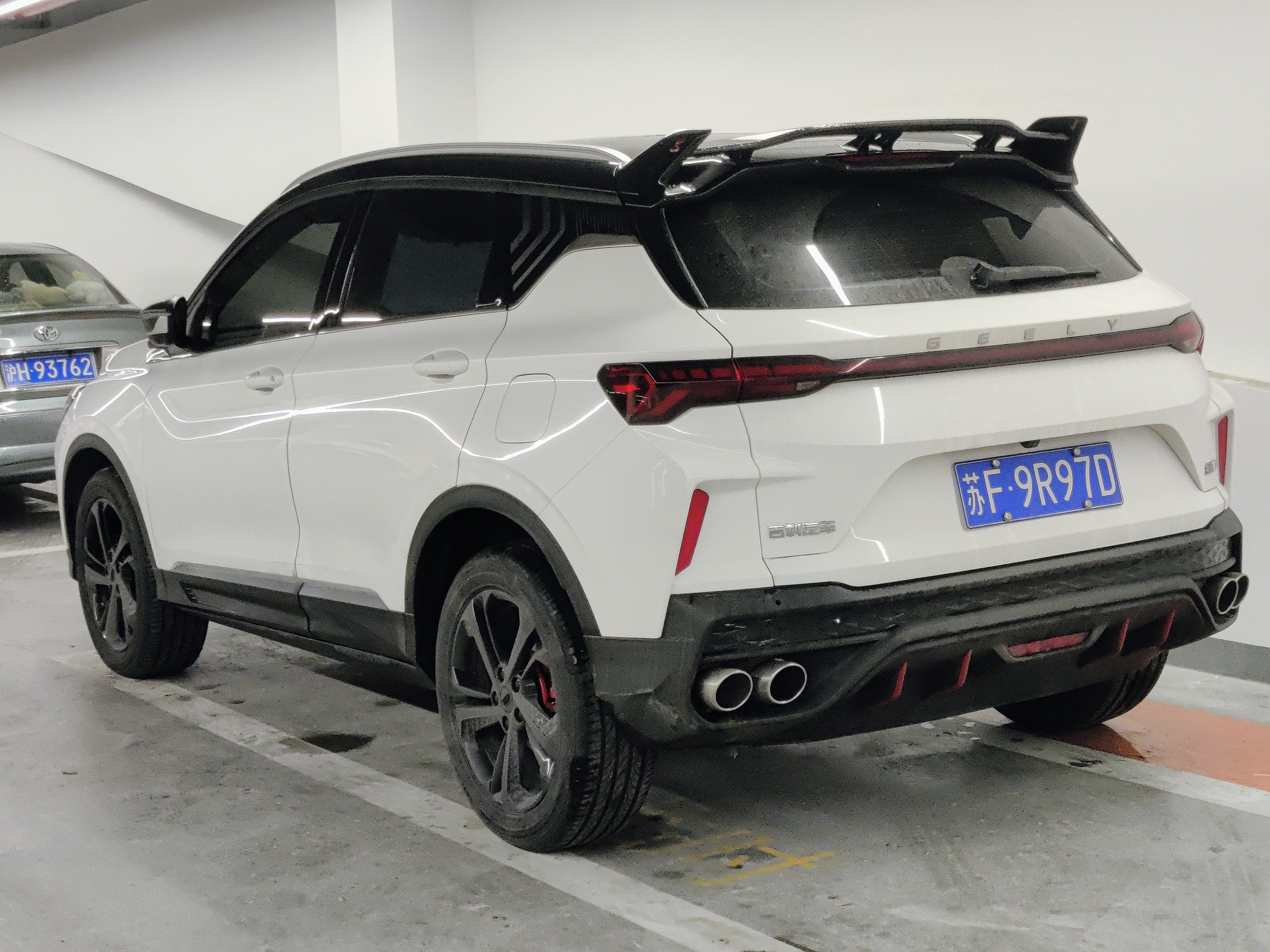
Rear view (first facelift)

=== Binyue L ===
In November 2024, the Binyue Cool received a second facelift dubbed the Binyue L.

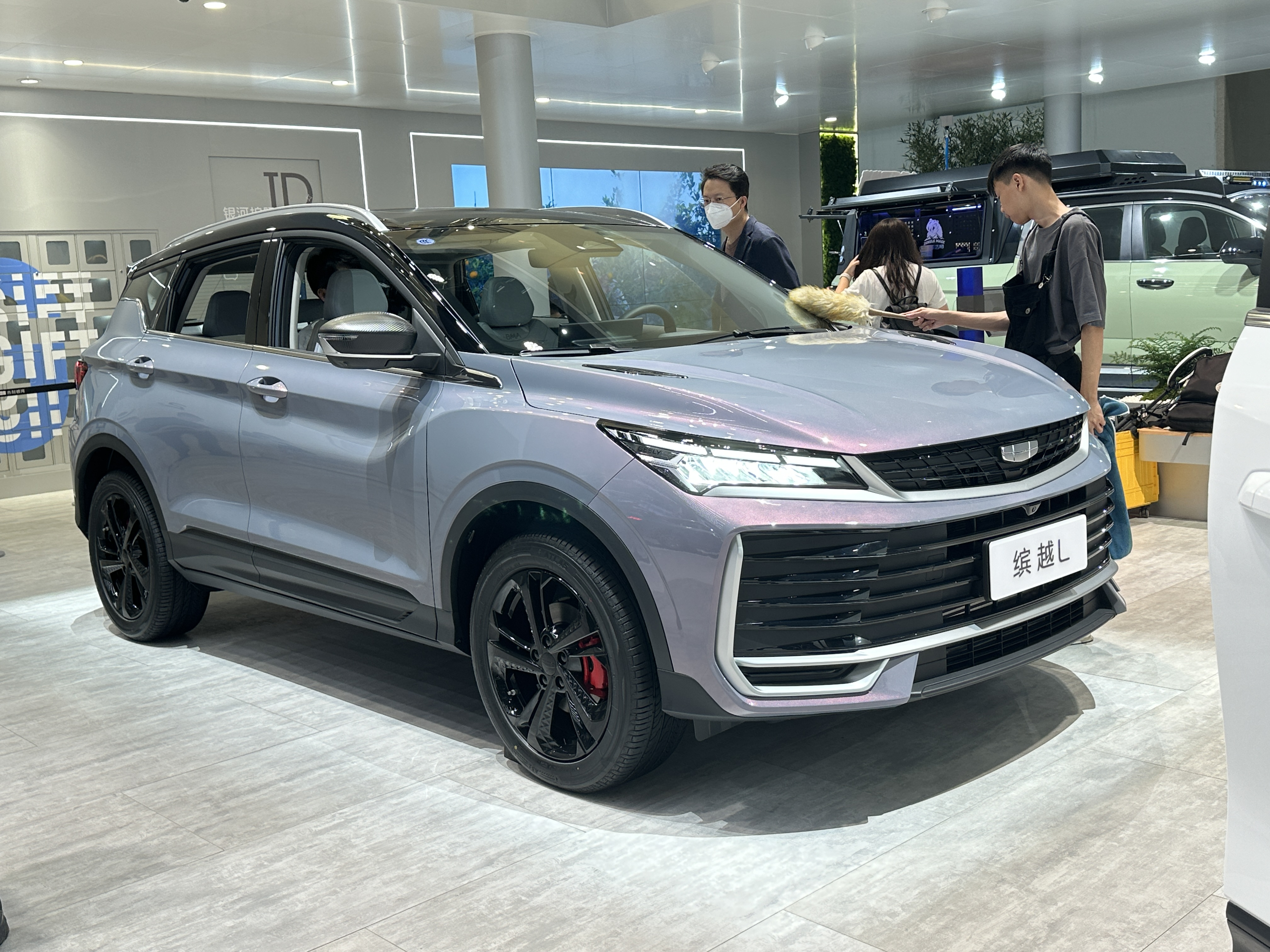
Front view (second facelift)

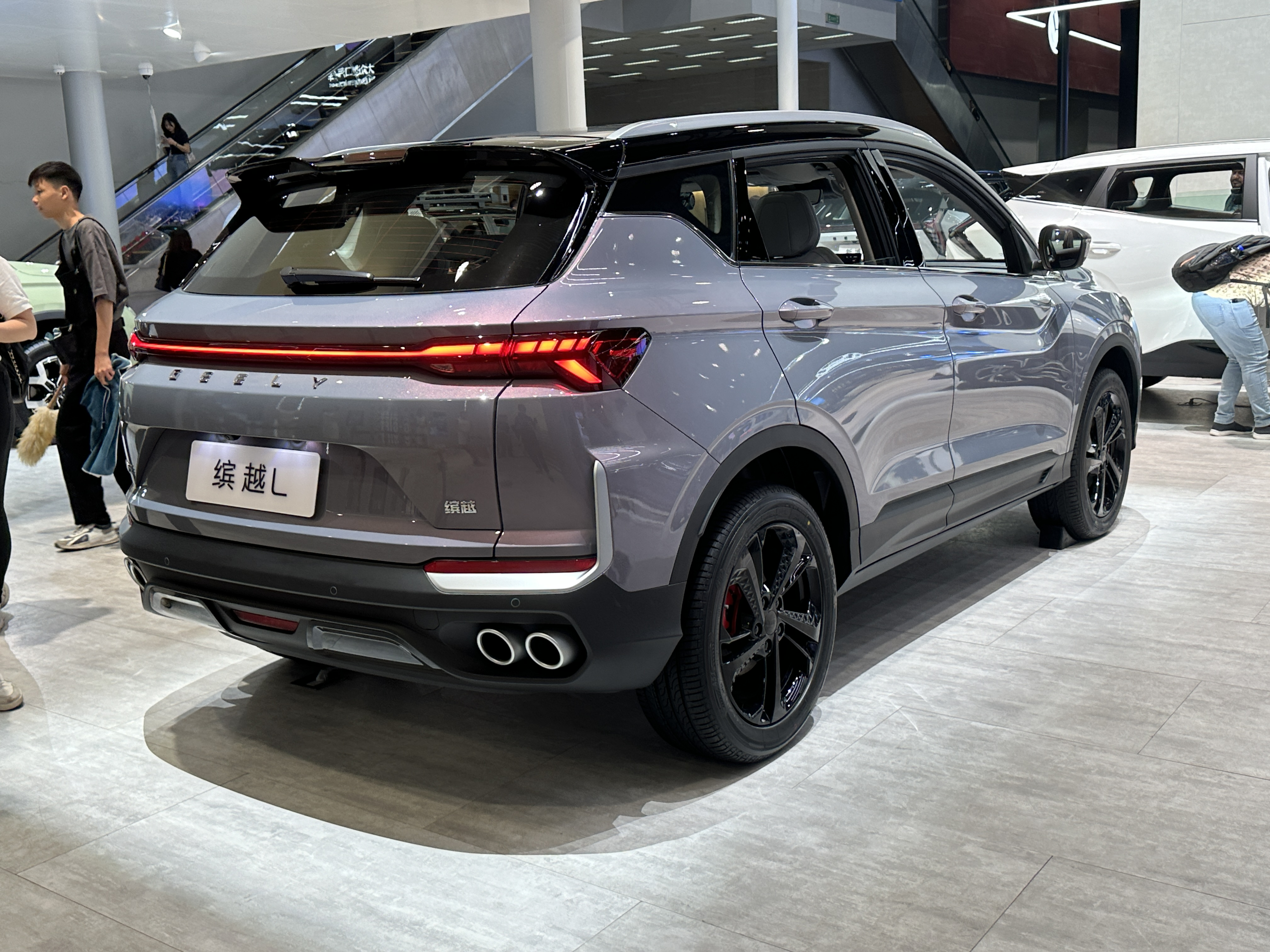
Rear view (second facelift)

== Export markets ==
=== Africa ===
==== South Africa ====
In South Africa, the Binyue is sold as the Coolray. It was launched on 19 June 2026, with three variants: Nova, Vanguard and Vertex. All variants are powered by the JLH-3G15TD 1.5-litre turbocharged petrol engine. The South African market Coolray exterior based on the first facelift Binyue and the interior is shared with the Binyue L.

=== Asia ===
==== Indonesia ====
In Indonesia, the Binyue is sold as the Coolray. It was launched on 29 July 2026 at the 33nd Gaikindo Indonesia International Auto Show, with two variants: Standard and Flagship, fully imported from Malaysia. All variants are powered by the BE15-EFZ 1.5-litre turbocharged petrol engine. The exterior of the Indonesian market Coolray exterior based on the first facelift Binyue and the interior is shared with the facelifted Proton X50.

==== Malaysia ====
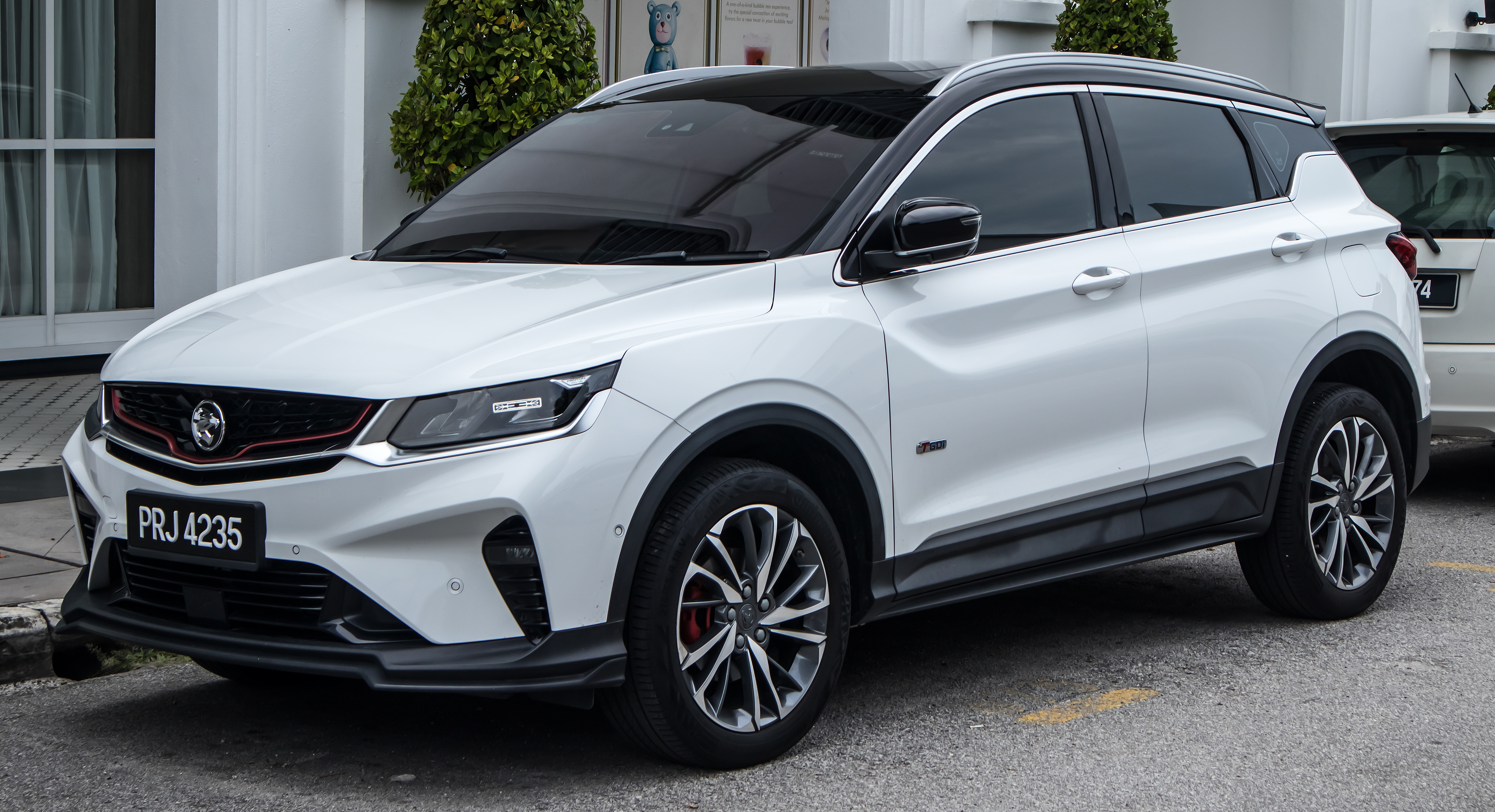
Proton X50

In Malaysia, the Binyue is sold as the Proton X50. It was revealed on 15 September 2020, and launched on 27 October 2020. It is locally assembled at Proton's facility in Tanjung Malim as their second SUV model and the second Geely-based model after the X70.

==== Philippines ====
In the Philippines, the Binyue is sold as the Coolray. It was launched on 25 September 2019 and marks Geely's return to the Philippine market. It is available in three variants: Comfort, Premium and Sport. All variants are powered by the JLH-3G15TD 1.5-litre turbocharged petrol engine. The Sport Limited variant was made available in October 2021 with only 1,000 units were made. The Coolray received an update in April 2022 at the 17th Manila International Auto Show, while introducing two new variants; SE and GT Limited Edition. The latter variant was sold exclusively in a Geely dealership in Quezon City. The facelifted Coolray based on the Binyue Cool was launched in the Philippines on 3 September 2024, with three variants: Comfort Plus, Premium Plus and Sport Plus. Unlike the pre-facelift Coolray, all variants of the facelift model are powered by the BE15-EFZ 1.5-litre turbocharged petrol engine.

==== Vietnam ====
In Vietnam, the Binyue is sold as the Coolray. Initially imported from Malaysia, it was launched on 21 March 2025 with three variants: Standard, Premium and Flagship. All variants are powered by the JLH-3G15TD 1.5-litre turbocharged petrol engine. The facelifted Coolray based on the Binyue L was launched in Vietnam on 5 June 2026. The variants and engine option remain the same from the pre-facelift model, except the Standard was replaced by the Executive as the entry-level variant.

=== Europe ===
==== Belarus ====
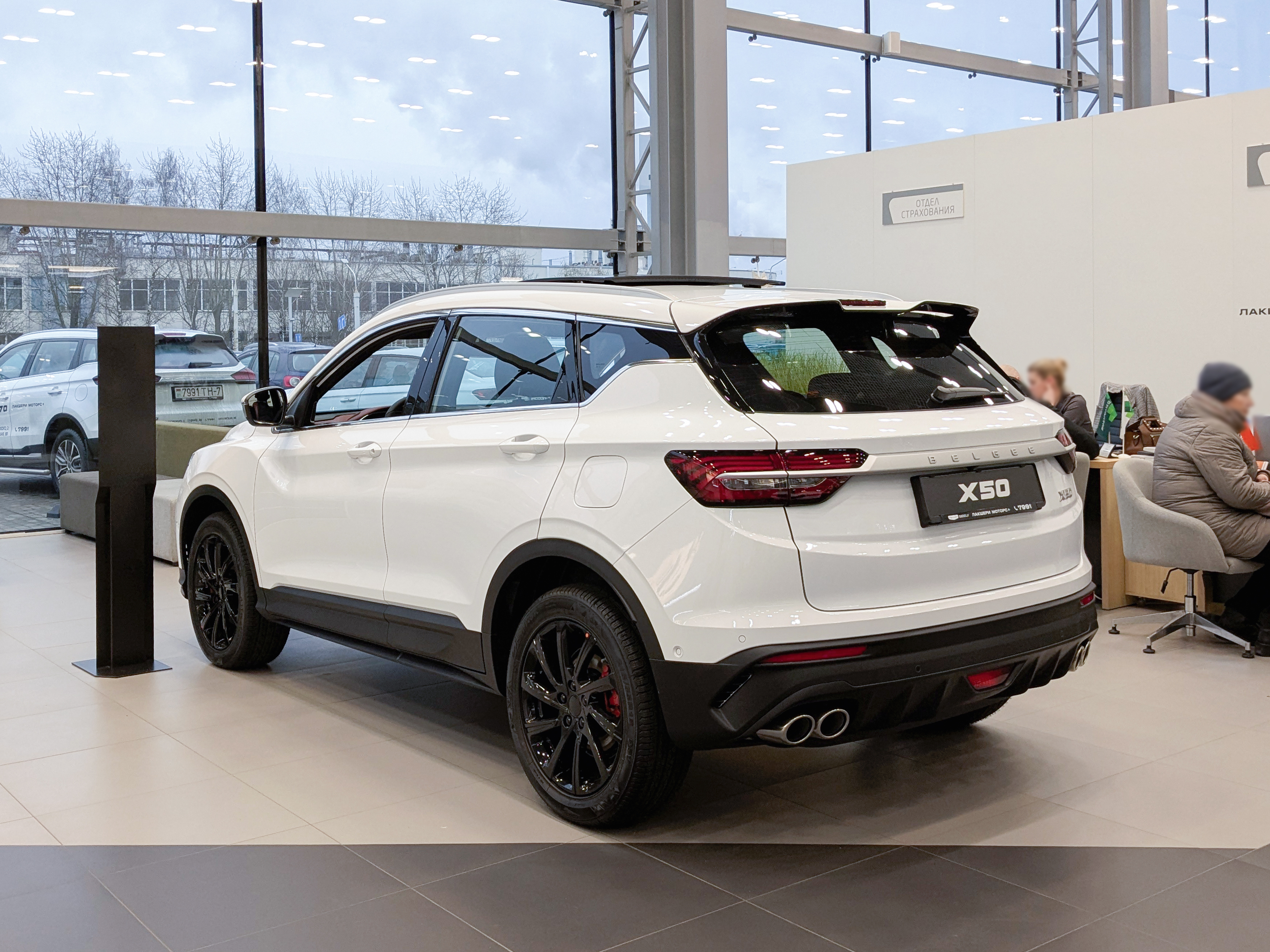
Belgee X50 in Belarus

The Binyue was launched on 12 February 2020 as the Coolray. It is assembled by BelGee, a joint-venture between Geely and BelAZ. In August 2023, the Coolray was renamed to BelGee X50.

==== Russia ====
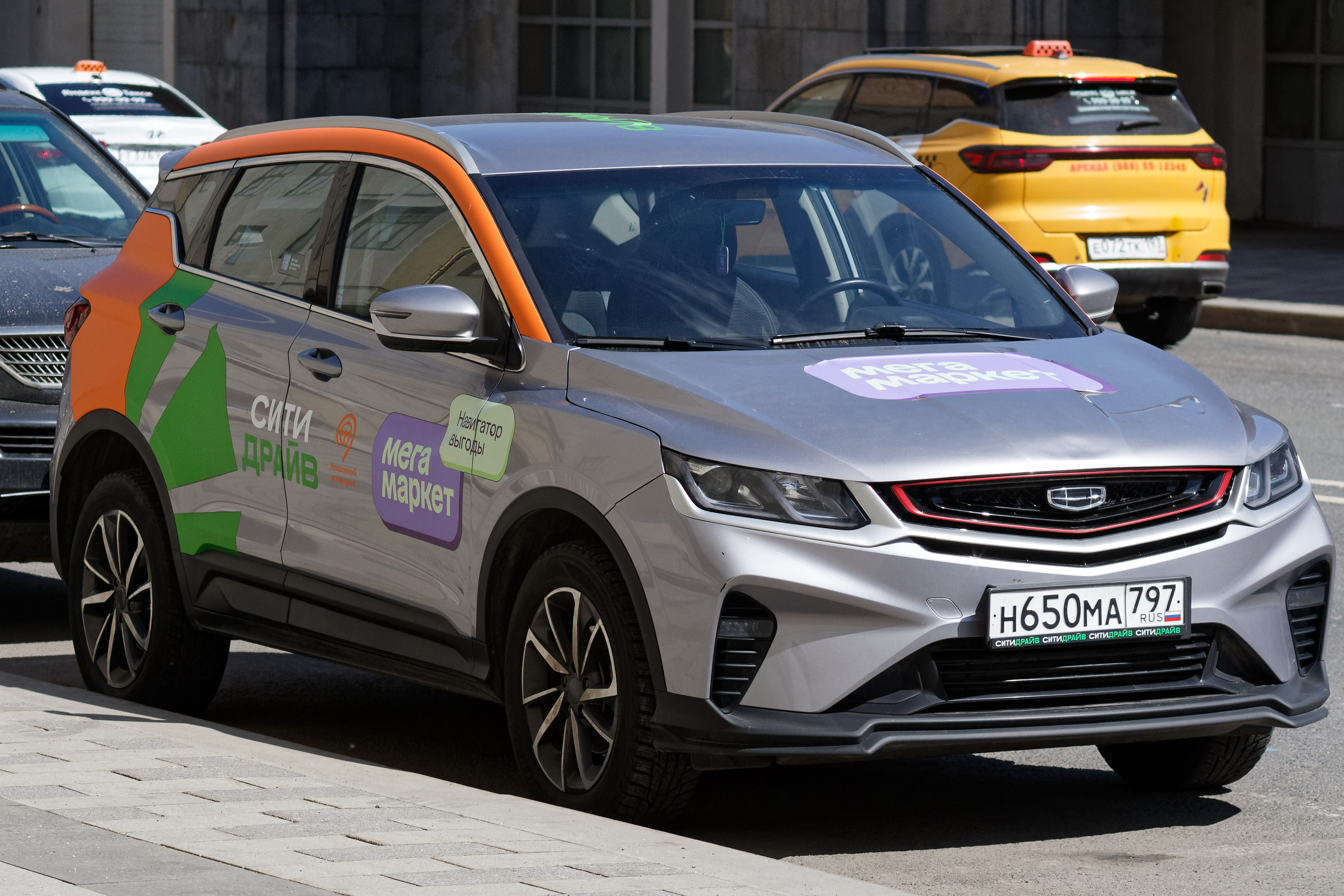
Geely Coolray in Moscow

The Binyue was launched in Russia on 27 February 2020 as the Coolray. Prior to launching the facelifted model, the pre-facelift Coolray was renamed to BelGee X50 on 18 September 2023, switching from the Chinese imported units to Belarus assembled units. The facelifted model was launched on 18 October 2023, using the styling derived from the Binyue Cool, with the cheaper Belarus-built BelGee X50 continue to be sold alongside it.

== Safety ==
Level 2 automated driving system with Intelligent Cruise Control with follow traffic up to 150 km/h (93 mph) plus change lanes autonomously and Automated Parking assist.

== Sales ==
Year	China	Russia	Mexico	Total production
2018			—	23,361
2019			—	137,528
2020		5,634	—	126,145
2021	91,836	11,101	—	147,403
2022	98,695	11,692	—	136,428
2023	89,920	38,188	—	
2024	88,594	56,087	2,905	
2025	118,866		3,257	
