= Behrang 2020 =

Township in Perak, Malaysia

Behrang 2020 Bandar Behrang 2020 بيهراڠ 2020
- Township
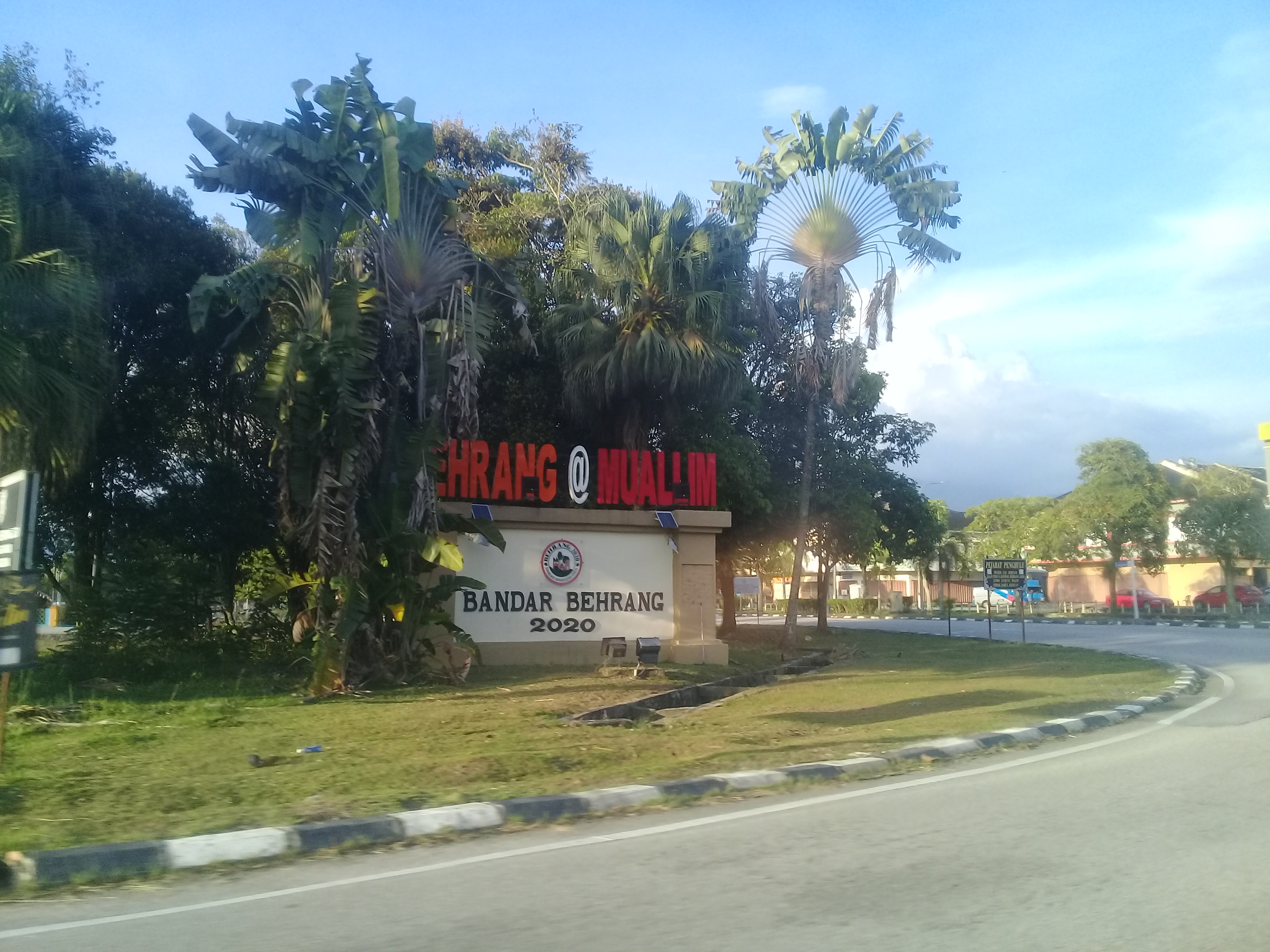
- View of the Behrang 2020 township.

- Location within Malaysia
- Country: Malaysia
- State: Perak
- District: Muallim District

Behrang 2020 (Jawi: بيهراڠ 2020) or Bandar Behrang 2020 is a township in Perak, Malaysia. It is located between Behrang and Tanjung Malim. The number 2020 stands for the year of the Wawasan 2020 vision.
