= Proton X70 =

Malaysian compact crossover SUV

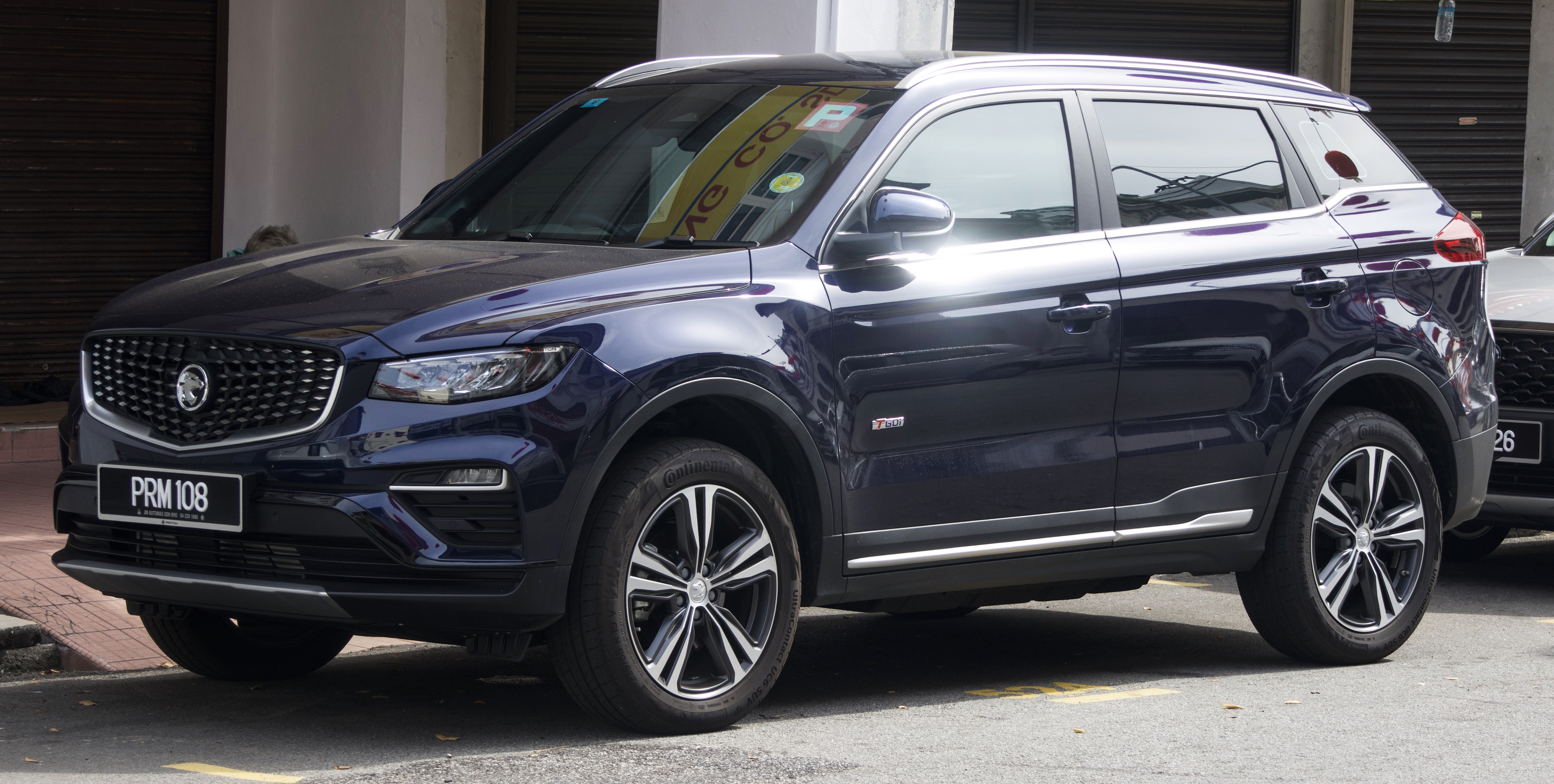
- 2024 X70 facelift

Overview
- Manufacturer: Proton
- Also called: Geely Boyue
- Production: 2018–present
- Assembly: China: Ningbo, Zhejiang (2019); Malaysia: Proton City, Tanjung Malim, Perak (PTMSB, 2020–present); Pakistan: Karachi (Al-Haj Group, 2021–present)
- Designer: Azlan Othman

Body and chassis
- Class: Compact crossover SUV (C)
- Body style: 5-door SUV
- Layout: Front-engine, front-wheel-drive (2018-present); Front-engine, four-wheel-drive (2018-2024)
- Platform: Geely NL

Powertrain
- Engine: Petrol: 1.5 L JLH-3G15TD I3 turbo (2022-2025); 1.5 L BHE15-EFZ turbo I4 (2026–present); 1.8 L 4G18TDB I4 turbo; (2018-2024)
- Transmission: 6-speed automatic (CBU 2018-2019); 7-speed wet DCT (CKD 2019-present)

Dimensions
- Wheelbase: 2,670 mm (105.1 in)
- Length: 4,519 mm (177.9 in)
- Width: 1,831 mm (72.1 in)
- Height: 1,694 mm (66.7 in)
- Curb weight: 1,585–1,675 kg (3,494–3,693 lb)

The Proton X70 is a compact crossover SUV produced by the Malaysian car maker Proton. Marketed as a C-segment SUV, the car was launched on 12 December 2018, unveiled in a ceremony by then-prime minister and former Proton chairman Mahathir Mohamad. Being the first SUV released by Proton, it is conceived by rebadging the Geely Boyue, following the acquisition of Proton by Geely Automobile Holdings in 2017. The X70 is distinguishable from the Boyue by some design element differences and its right-hand drive configuration.

In the beginning, the X70 was fully imported (CBU or completely built-up) from China, but since February 2020 the locally assembled version (CKD or complete knocked down) was made available with several notable mechanical changes.

== Background ==
=== Pre-launch ===
On 24 May 2017, DRB-HICOM as the owner of Proton has reached an agreement with Geely for the Chinese carmaker to acquire a 49.9% equity stake in Proton. The acquisition and partnership was urgently needed, since at the time DRB-HICOM cites several problems which were Proton's lack of technological competitiveness, which it claimed could hamper its ability to develop quality products. Through the close partnership, Proton will have access to Geely's technologies to address the problem. In the same day, DRB-HICOM announced a plan to build a crossover SUV for Proton based on the Geely Boyue. The Boyue was picked as the first new product under the Geely ownership to compete in the booming SUV market, which Proton had no presence in.

Being the first Geely-based product, the X70 does not share any components with any other Proton vehicle. Proton claimed that pricing the X70 competitively was a great challenge as it lacked parts commonality with other models, and yield smaller scale production relative to its left-hand drive Chinese counterpart.

In April 2018, Proton opened up an online poll to the public to vote on the name. Participants could choose between PX7, X7, X70 and X700 or voice in their own input. X70 was later announced as the chosen name for the SUV in September 2018. In June 2018, it was announced that the initial units were going to be fully imported (CBU) from China with latter models being locally assembled (CKD) at Proton's plant. The X70 was previewed at the 2018 Kuala Lumpur International Motor Show.

=== Post-launch ===
The X70 was officially launched on 12 December 2018 at the Kuala Lumpur Convention Centre. In the launch ceremony, then-prime minister Mahathir Mohamad presents the first X70 key to his wife Siti Hasmah Mohamad Ali during the launch, a tribute to the original Proton Saga launch as the first Proton vehicle. She then proceeded to drive across the Penang bridge in a nod to the original Proton Saga.

The X70 is available with four variants. Prior to the CKD version these were Standard 2WD, Executive 2WD, Executive AWD and Premium 2WD. All variants are powered by the same 1.8-litre turbocharged gasoline direct injection (TGDI) engine with the Geely Boyue, producing 182 hp (185 PS; 136 kW) and 285 N⋅m (29.1 kg⋅m; 210 lb⋅ft) paired to a 6-speed automatic gearbox.

Local assembly of the X70 in Proton's Tanjung Malim plant commenced on 13 December 2019. In February 2020, the locally assembled (CKD) version was launched with lowered pricing and a few major mechanical updates. The gearbox is now a 7-speed wet DCT, and the same 1.8-litre TGDI engine has its torque increased by 15 N⋅m (1.53 kg⋅m; 11.1 lb⋅ft) (to 300 N⋅m (30.6 kg⋅m; 221 lb⋅ft)). It is still available in four variants, however the top two variants had received a major revision. The Executive AWD trim has been discontinued due to low demand and in its place the Premium 2WD. The CKD Premium 2WD trim however excludes the panoramic sunroof previously included in the CBU version. The panoramic sunroof is instead reserved for the top-of-the-line Premium X 2WD; the only additional feature for this variant. Although identical in styling to the CBU, the CKD version is distinguishable by its use of Proton's new round logo. With the introduction of the CKD units, the CBU units were no longer being imported from China.

In August 2019, Proton introduced a special version of the car called the Proton X70 Merdeka Edition of which only 62 are available for sale to celebrate Malaysia's 62nd independence day on 31 August 2019. Only 2 colours were offered; Flame Red (26 units) or Snow White (36 units).

The X70 was launched in Pakistan in December 2020. Initially, a fixed quota of the X70 has been planned to be imported from Malaysia. It is also expected that local assembly of Proton X70 will also start in Karachi in mid-2021.

In July 2021, Proton introduced a special version of the car called the Proton X70 Special Edition. Only 2 colours were offered; Ocean Blue and Ruby Red. Powertrains remained the same as the original X70.

In June 2022, the X70 received minor changes dubbed as MC (Minor Change) giving the model some mild styling tweaks, revision of its line-up and a new engine option. Standard, Executive and Premium variants are powered by a 1.5-litre turbocharged engine shared with the X50 while the range-topping variant also called Premium is powered by the same 1.8-litre turbocharged engine. AWD is only available on the Executive variant. The X70 is localized to almost 70% of its parts were made.

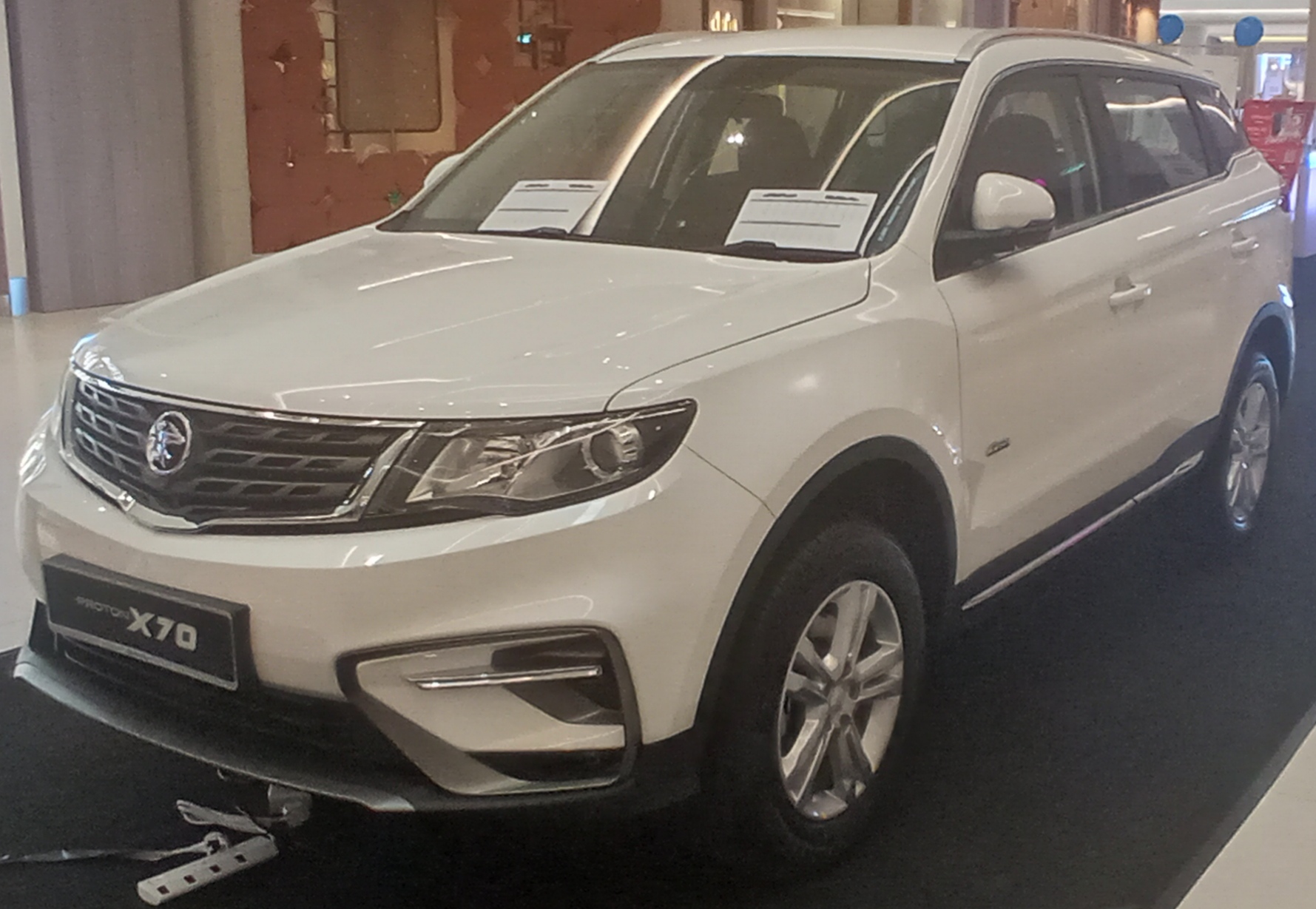
2022 Proton X70 (Front; pre-facelift)

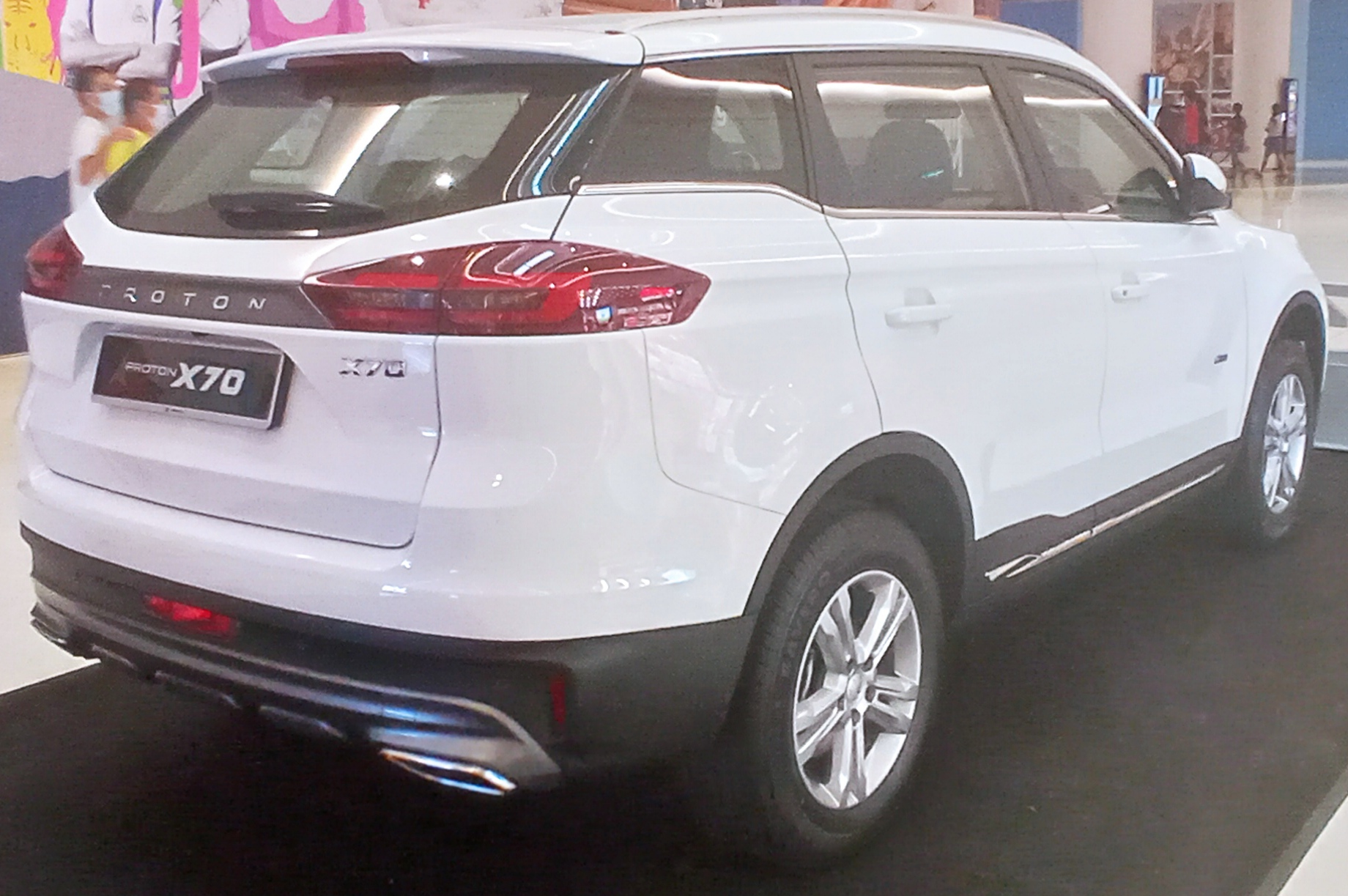
2022 Proton X70 (Rear; pre-facelift)

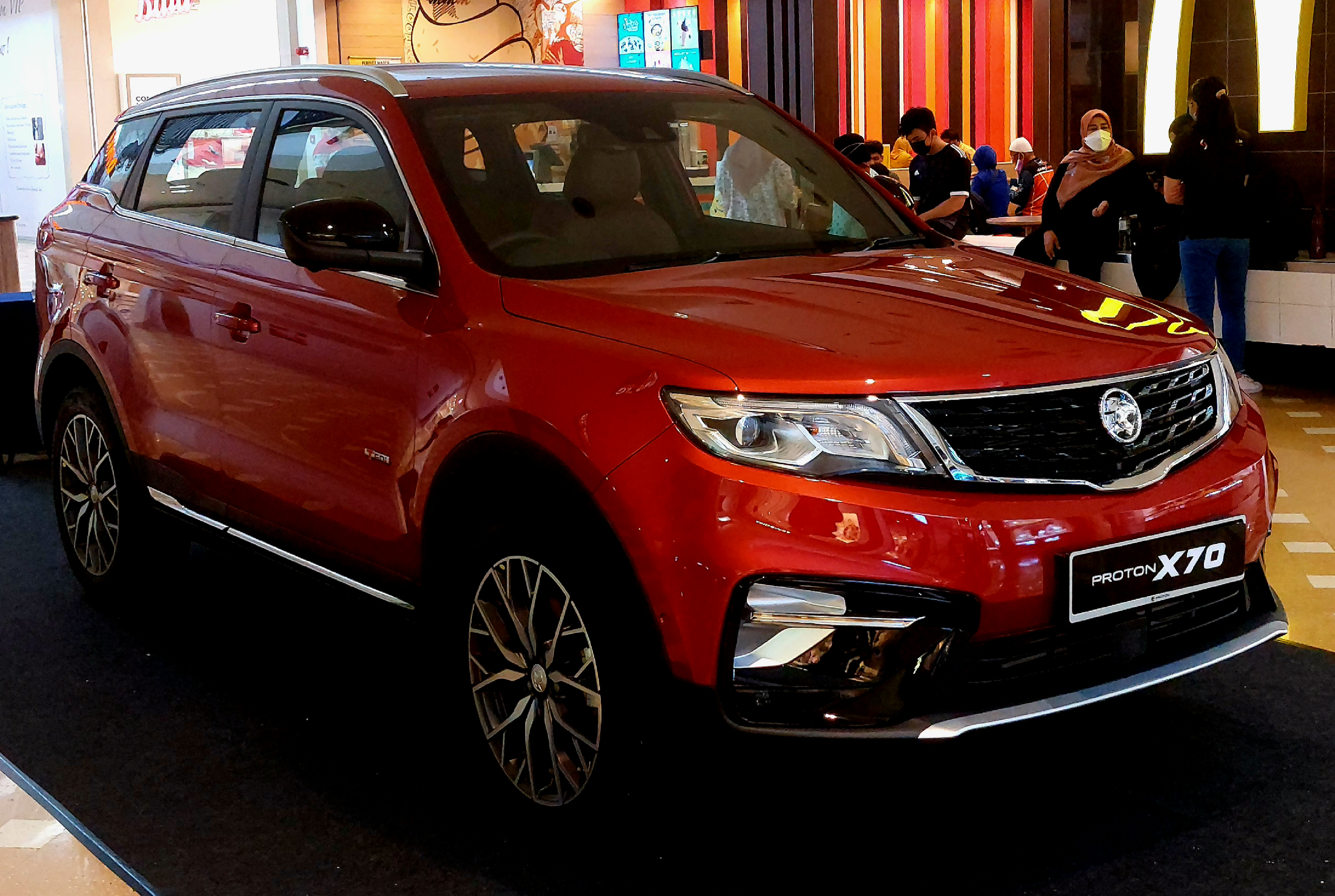
2023 Proton X70 (Front; MC)

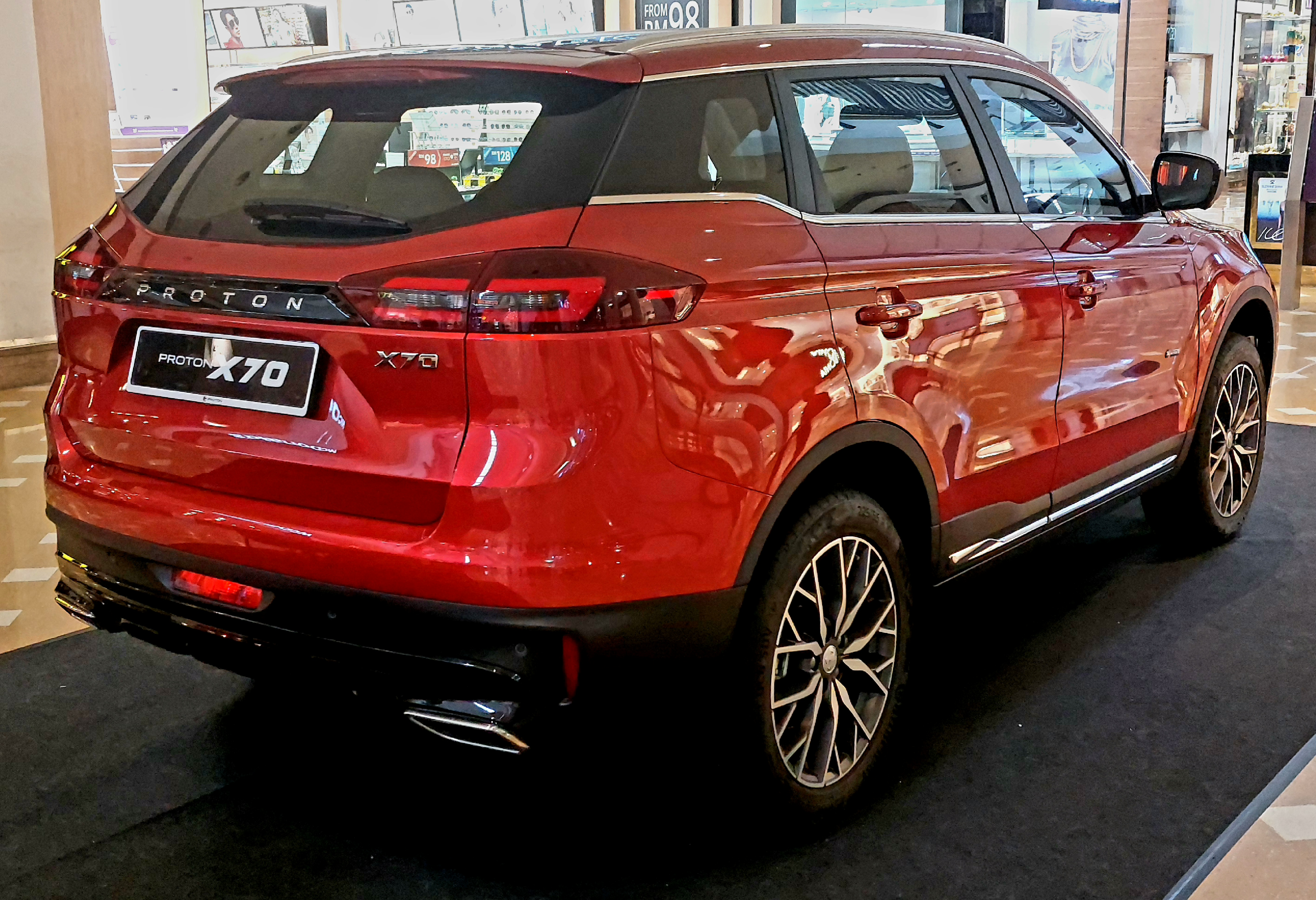
2023 Proton X70 (Rear; MC)

=== Facelift ===
On 2 August 2024, the Proton X70 has undergone a major facelift to refresh its aging design. The new look features a bold grille with Proton's Infinite Weave design and songket-inspired diamond pins seen on the X90 and S70, slimmer LED headlights, and a redesigned front bumper. The rear bumper has also been updated with horizontal reflectors and fake air outlets. The X70 now comes with new 19-inch or 18-inch two-tone wheels, depending on the variant.

Inside, the X70 sports a new dashboard with a gloss black panel and 72-colour ambient lighting that changes with the music. It also introduces a larger 12.3-inch touchscreen with Apple CarPlay and Android Auto, although these features will be available via a future update. The car’s hardware includes dual quad-core processors, 4GB of RAM, and 32GB of storage. USB ports have been updated to include both USB-A and USB-C options.

The facelifted X70 features new steering wheel design, Stone Grey Nappa leather upholstery, and updated digital meter panel graphics. The gear lever has a new design, and the car includes new semi-autonomous driving features like adaptive cruise control with stop-and-go, lane centering assist, and traffic sign recognition.

The X70 retains its 1.5-litre turbocharged engine, producing 177 PS and 255 Nm of torque, and is paired with a revised seven-speed dual-clutch transmission. Fuel economy is improved by 4% compared to the previous model. The previous 1.8-litre turbocharged Premium and Executive AWD variant were dropped from the facelift. The facelifted X70 is available in four variants—Standard, Executive, Premium, and Premium X—with a new Marine Blue colour option added, all powered by the same 1.5-litre turbocharged unit. Proton has updated 360 parts of the X70, which underwent 4.2 million km of testing.

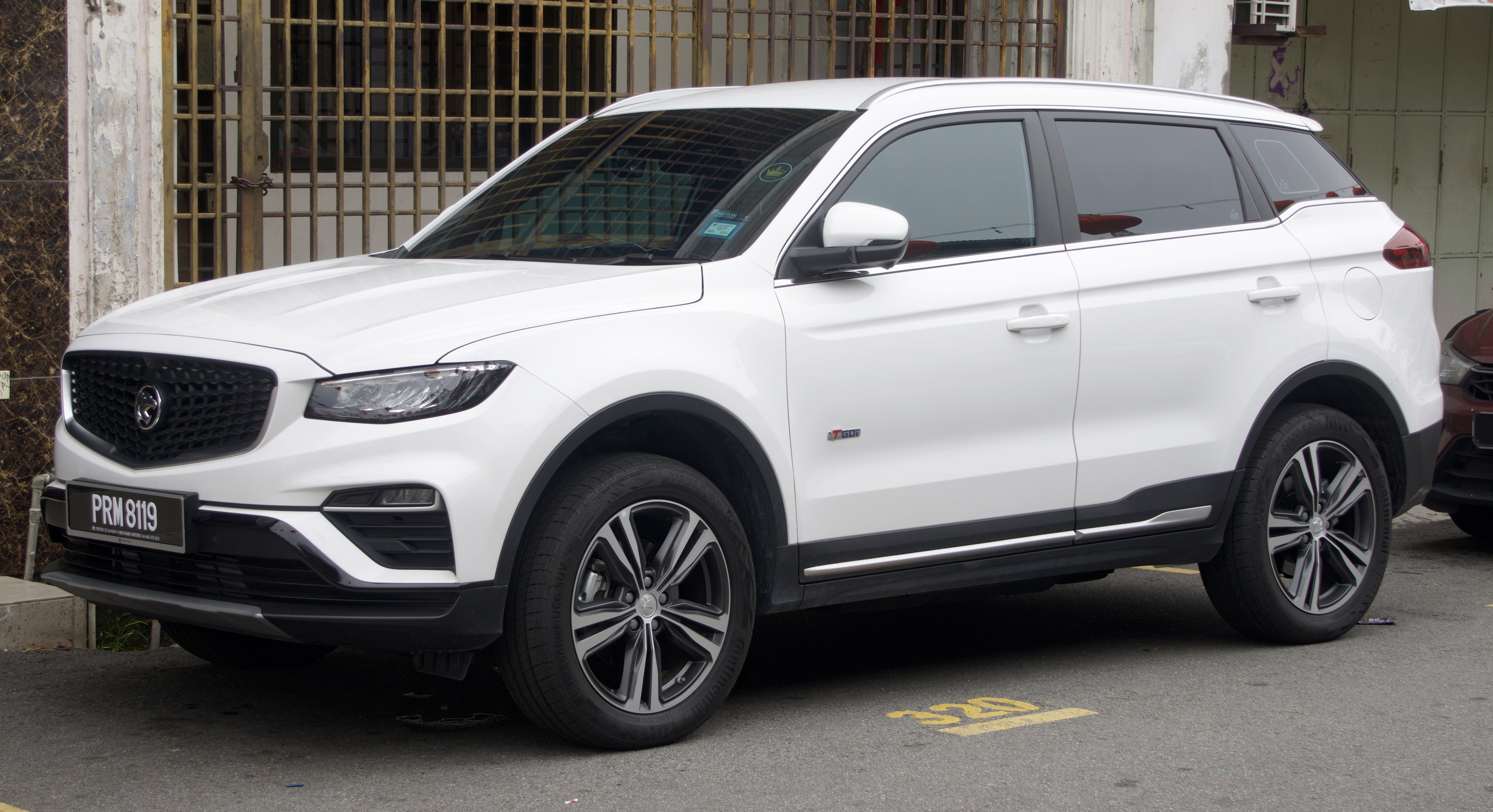
Proton X70 facelift

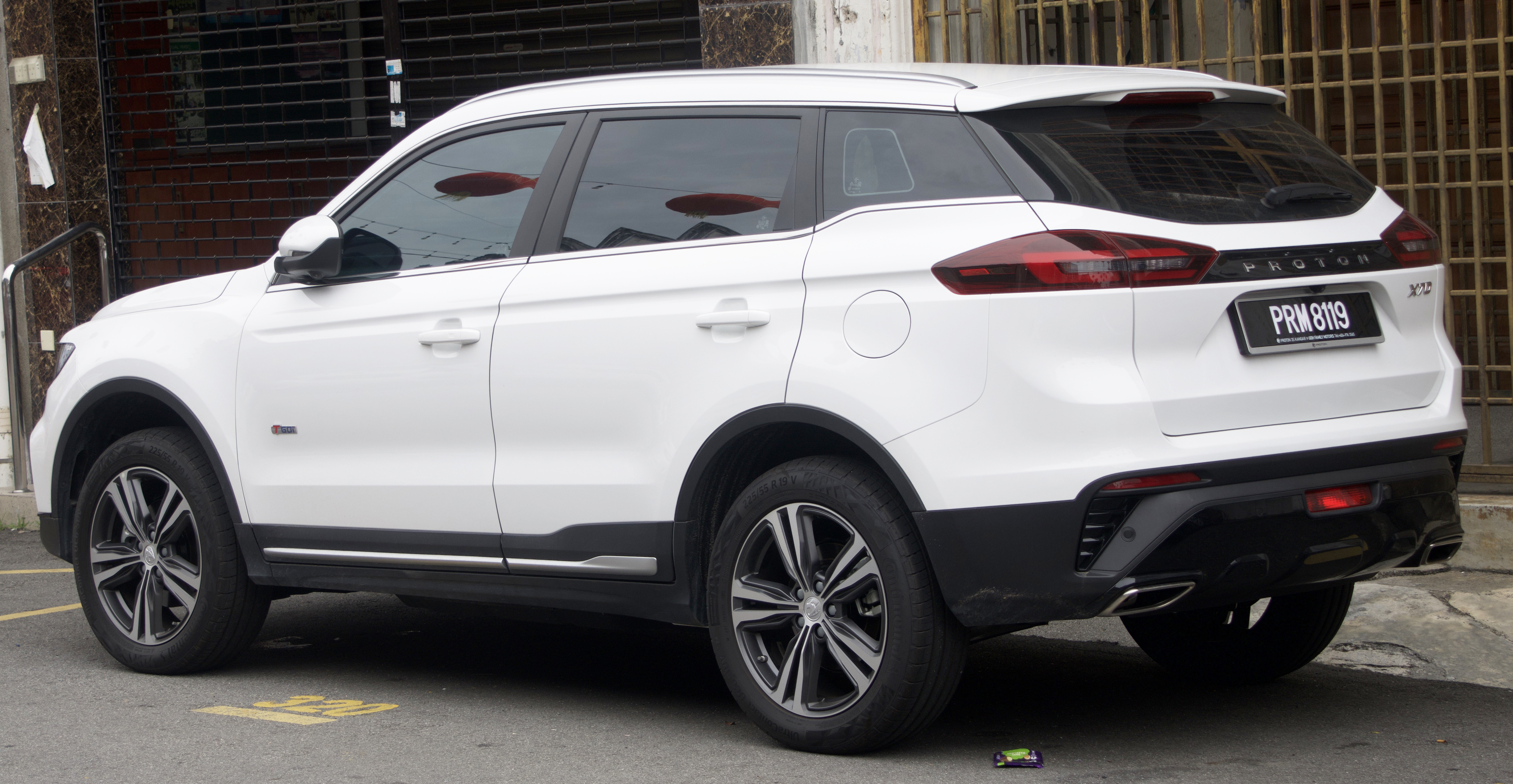
Rear view

== Etymology ==
The "-70" suffix is correlated to it being a C-segment vehicle, similar to the Proton S70 while the "X" implies the vehicle being an SUV.

== Development ==
Compared to the Boyue, Proton said it had to reposition and realign several critical parts which include the dashboard assembly, pedals, steering console, door buttons, brakes, gearbox, headlights calibration, wiper orientation, air-conditioning ducts, glove box, and several cables and wires in order to convert it into a right-hand drive vehicle, as the Boyue was not developed to have an RHD version in mind. A total of 761 parts had to be changed to convert the Boyue into the right-hand drive X70, without counting the components that were completely re-engineered.

The localisation process also involved several adjustments of the car to suit the tropical climate. Some rubber components and cooling parts had to be redesigned, while the engine management system had to be recalibrated to account for the rougher terrain and altitude. The X70 must be able to withstand Kuala Lumpur's standstill traffic at 34 °C (93 °F) daily, drive up to the mountainous Genting Highlands at over 1,800 metres (6,000 ft) where the air is thinner, as well as survive the treacherous landscape of East Malaysia. After all the changes, the X70 had to undergo a testing process that involved repeating around 25 percent of the 548 tests that was conducted in the development of the donor car, the Boyue.

Proton managed to reach 45 percent of local content for the X70 by the time production in Tanjung Malim began in late 2019. It was achieved by sourcing components from local suppliers, which some of them did not initially have the capability to produce several advanced components. Proton and Geely offered a solution by initiating a series of and technical assistance and joint ventures agreements with Geely suppliers in China. The company aims to increase the local component figure to around 53 percent by the end of 2020.

A total of 95 Proton engineers were said to be involved in the entire process of turning the Boyue into the X70, from research and development to the testing stages. These engineers, along with technicians from manufacturing and quality divisions, made up around a total 200 people the company sent to Geely within a span of six months to conceive the X70. Each of these individuals were claimed by the group has learned knowledge and experience from their counterparts at Geely, further enhancing Proton engineering expertise.

On 7 June 2022, a recall was made for CBU versions of the X70 to fix the cooling fan assembly made by Valeo under the chassis number L6T7742Z8KU043589.

== Design ==
There are a few design elements incorporated into the X70 to distinguish it from the Boyue, especially at the front of the SUV. A new grille design is used and it is referred to as the "infinite weave". It is inspired by the batik and Malaysian wood carvings, and the design is also used on the inside for the speaker covers. A chrome surround is added on the grille and is inspired by a hunting bow, one of Malaysia's traditional weapons. To further showcase Proton's identity and evoke the appearance of a tiger, the muscular body surfacing of the X70 is also accompanied by a headlight design inspired by the eyes of a tiger.

== Interior ==
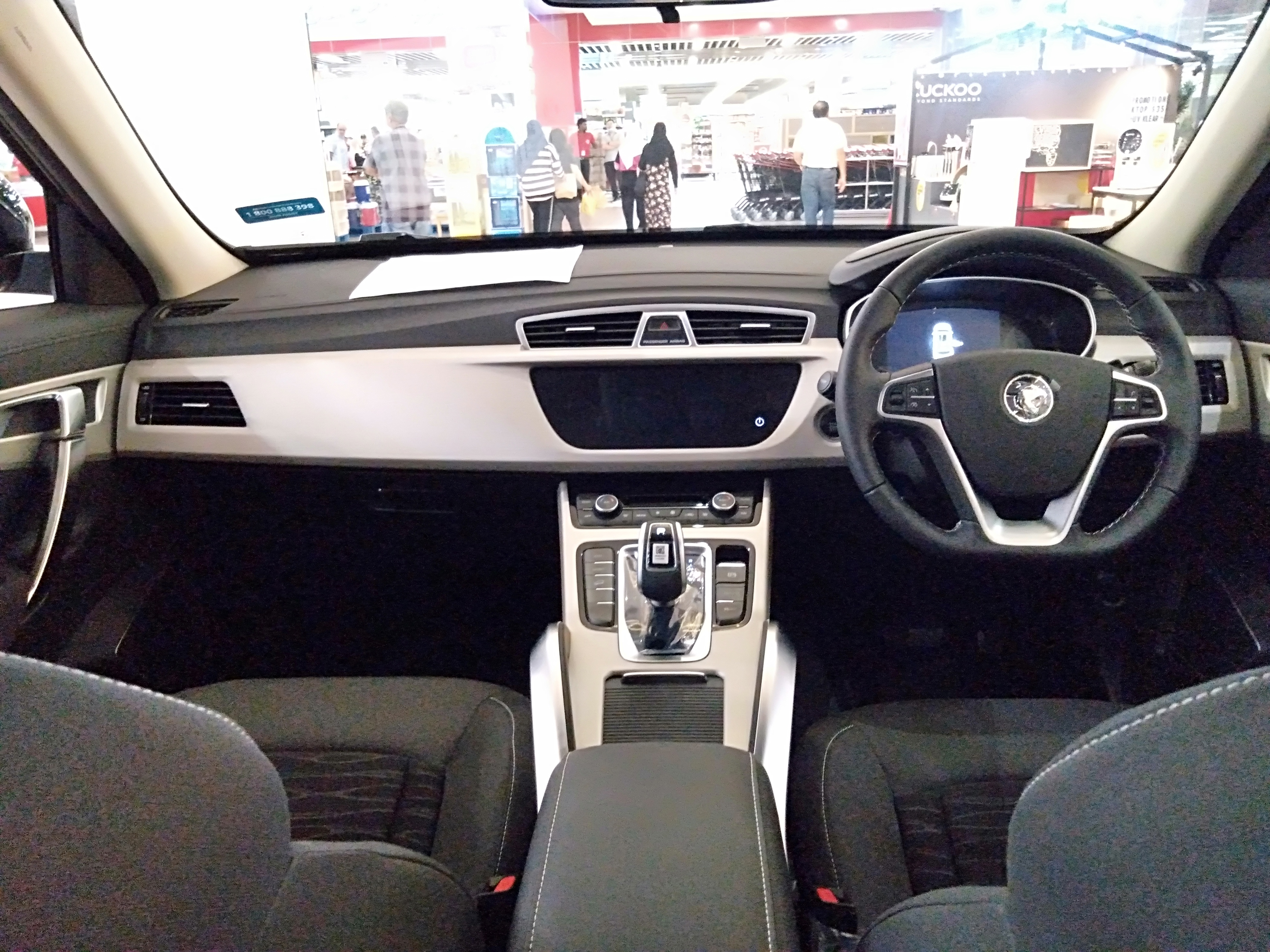
Interior (pre-facelift)

A tonneau cover, air purifier system, rear air vents, dual zone automatic climate control, steering wheel switches, tilt and telescopic adjustment, LCD meter combination, central door locking with auto lock and push start button are all standard interior related features.

Across the range, the Proton 'GKUI' head-unit is offered which consists of 8-inch touchscreen display, voice recognition, online music streaming, navigation, smartphone connectivity, Bluetooth connectivity and 4G Wi-Fi. Speaker count is 6 on the Standard 2WD variant, 8 on the Executive 2WD and 9 on the Premium 2WD and Premium X 2WD variant with the additional subwoofer. Note that the Premium 2WD variants gets additional voice recognition functionality. The GKUI Android-based infotainment system is based on the similar system found in the Boyue with adjustments to operate properly in Malaysia.

=== Facelift ===
The X70 now features a new three-spoke steering wheel and a unique dashboard with a gloss black panel and multi-colour ambient lighting that changes with the music. It also has a larger 12.3-inch “floating” infotainment screen, compared to the previous 10.25-inch version. The major update is the addition of Apple CarPlay and Android Auto. Moreover, the Proton Link app has been upgraded to allow users to start the engine remotely, enabling them to cool down the vehicle before getting inside. Material wise, new Stone Grey Nappa leather replaces the old brown upholstery, with a new crisscross stitching pattern on the door cards and a black headlining instead of beige.

== Safety ==
=== ASEAN NCAP ===
Proton X70 had received a full score in ASEAN NCAP crash safety rating for the side impact test as well as for head protection technology in 2018. All versions are equipped with ABS, EBD, brake assist, ESC, traction control, six airbags, ISOFIX child seat mounting points, and seat belts with pretensioners and load limiters.

ASEAN NCAP test results Proton X70 (2018)
Test	Points
Overall:	5 /5 stars
Adult occupant:	48.99
Child occupant:	20.80
Safety assist:	19.44

== Reception ==
=== Malaysia ===
The X70 has received generally favourable reviews from critics in its domestic market. Malaysian automotive journalist Jonathan Lee from paultan.org commended the X70's looks, infotainment, suspension and NVH attributes. The overall package offered were exceptionally praised, in which Lee claimed was "beyond anything else in the segment – with or without the pricing advantage". However Lee also criticised on the high driving position, shallow boot and lack of more common features found in the segment such as a powered tailgate. HP from evomalaysia.com commended the X70's premium feeling interior but commented that steering feel could be improved and both turbo lag and body roll is quite noticeable.

With the locally assembled model, Hafriz Shah from paultan.org criticized the X70's lack of differences in the exterior when compared to the CBU variant and the new Proton logo as "out of place". Shah however commended on the improvements compared to the CBU model which includes the DCT transmission and added equipment. Kon from evomalaysia.com shared a similar conclusion saying the improvement bundled with the reduced price makes the X70 ever harder to avoid. Kon however did criticise the X70 as "not quite as sporty as Proton vehicles from the 2000s"

== Awards and accolades ==
- Connectivity & Infotainment - Carlist.my Editors' Choice Awards 2018
- Vehicle Design of the Year - DSF.my Allianz Vehicle of the Year (VOTY) 2019
- Best 3 Mid-sized SUVs - 2019 'Cars of Malaysia'
- Local Car of the Year - CarSifu Editors’ Choice Awards 2019
- Best Large-size SUV/Crossover (2-row seating) - CarSifu Editors’ Choice Awards 2019

== Export markets ==
=== Brunei ===
In July 2019, PAD Motors, the official distributor of Proton cars in Brunei, has announced that Brunei will become the first export destination for the Proton X70, which is a right hand drive version of the Geely Boyue. It will be only be available in a 2 wheel drive configuration and will be offered in the same three variants as the Malaysian market: Standard 2WD, Executive 2WD and Premium 2WD. The car will include similar specifications to the Malaysian model including the 8" touchscreen display, voice recognition and the additional safety features such as the Advanced Driver Assistance System (ADAS) which is only available on the Premium 2WD variant.

The X70 update was launched on 6 September 2020 with the three trims: Standard, Executive and Premium X (all in 2WD trims).

The facelifted X70 was launched in Brunei on 31 January 2025.

=== Indonesia ===
Rully Septiadi, the head of marketing at Proton Edar Indonesia (PEI), mentioned in 2018 that the Geely Boyue was planned to be launched in Indonesia by 2019 as the Proton X70, it was expected to be showcased at the 27th Indonesia International Motor Show 2019. However, the plan was eventually postponed.

=== Kenya ===
On November 19, 2021, 30 X70s were sold to the Kenya Police Service.

=== Pakistan ===
The X70 is due to be exported to Pakistan after tests were conducted in Karachi. The Pakistani version will have a 1.5-litre engine mated to a seven-speed dual-clutch transmission at 174 hp (176 PS; 130 kW) and 255 N⋅m (26.0 kg⋅m; 188 lb⋅ft) because of Pakistani tax structures, which can make it affordable. In December 2019, the Malaysian PM gifted this car to the Pakistan PM on his arrival at Malaysia.

=== South Africa ===
On May 31, 2022, Proton has shipped some X70 units to South Africa alongside the Proton X50 and Proton Saga.

=== Mozambique ===
On May 26, 2023, X70 was launched in Mozambique with four variants: Standard, Executive and Premium X (all in AWD and 2WD).

=== Bangladesh ===
Rancon Auto Industries started assembling Proton cars from 2024 in Bangladesh. They launched three models of Proton: S70, X70 and X90 from April, 2025.

== Sales ==
Year	Malaysia
2019	26,331
2020	21,944
2021	16,375
2022	18,533
2023	11,038
