= Zainal Abidin Ahmad =

Zainal Abidin Ahmad may refer to:

- Zainal Abidin Ahmad (Malaysian politician) (1939–2010)
- Zainal Abidin Ahmad (Indonesian politician) (1911–1983), a deputy Speaker of the House of Representatives 1959–1960
- Zainal Abidin Ahmad (writer) (1895–1973), Malaysian writer
