= Tanjong Malim =

- Town and district capital

- Seal
- Nickname: Town of Education
- Location in Tanjong Malim in Perak
- Tanjong Malim in Perak Tanjong Malim (Malaysia) Tanjong Malim (Southeast Asia)
- Coordinates: 3°40′46.2″N 101°31′13.08″E
- Country: Malaysia
- State: Perak
- District: Muallim District
- Establishment: Around 1900

Government
  - Type: District council
  - Body: Tanjong Malim District Council
  - President: Mohd Ikram Ahmad

Area
  - Total: 949.86 km^{2} (366.74 sq mi)
- Elevation: 21.95 m (72.0 ft)

Population (2007)
  - Total: 60,791
  - Rank: 69th
  - Density: 63.99/km^{2} (165.7/sq mi)
- Time zone: UTC+8 (MST)
  - Summer (DST): Not observed
- Postcode: 35xxx
- Area code(s): 05-4xxxxxxx
- Vehicle registration: A

Tanjong Malim District Council Majlis Daerah Tanjong Malim
- Local Government Act 1976

Type
- Type: Municipal Council of Tanjong Malim

History
- Founded: 1 December 1979

Leadership
- President: Mohd Ikram Ahmad
- Secretary: Roslan Kamaruzaman

Motto
- Maju dan Jaya; Progress and Success

Meeting place
- 59, Bandar Behrang 2020, 35900 Tanjong Malim

Website
- www.mdtm.gov.my

Tanjong Malim, or Tanjung Malim, is a town in Muallim District, Perak, Malaysia. It is approximately 70 km (43 mi) north of Kuala Lumpur and 120 km south of Ipoh via the North–South Expressway. It lies on the Perak-Selangor state border, with Sungai Bernam serving as the natural divider.

"Tanjong Malim" usually refers to the territory under administration of Tanjong Malim District Council or Majlis Daerah Tanjong Malim (MDTM), which includes the smaller towns adjacent to the town such as Proton City, Behrang, Behrang 2020, Sungkai and Slim River. "Tanjong Malim" is also referred to the Old Town and New Town divided by the KTM Komuter rail at its heart. Tanjong Malim is home to the main campus of the Sultan Idris Education University (UPSI).

== History ==
According to Za'Ba, the place have sevearal names before were known as Tanjung Malim. A local informed him that the place were known initially as Sungai Genta. A mualim later known to conduct religious duites at the area before it become known to its current name. Another legend say it previously named Berenam (Malay for "of six"). The legend says there is six Bugis warrior that opened the place. One of them is a mualim.

In 1870, Pahang Civil War occur and Hj. Mustapha bin Raja Kamala, a follower of Tok Gajah and also leader of Rao people, lead his clan to move to Tanjung Malim. He then were appointed as the first chief of Tanjung Malim.

== Subdivision ==
Tanjong Malim in Muallim District

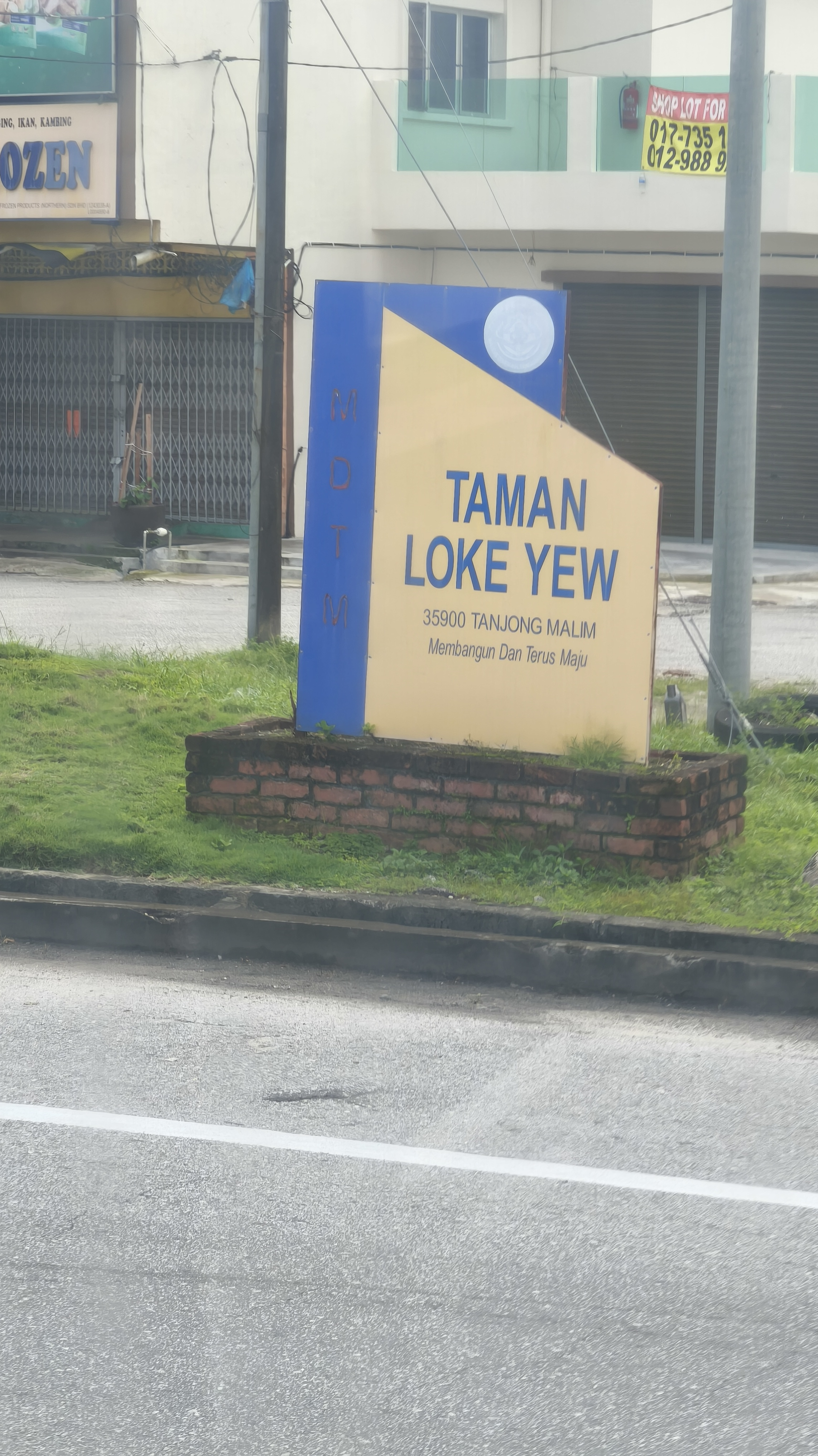
Residential area signboard for Taman Loke Yew, managed by the Tanjong Malim District Council.

The administrative area of Tanjong Malim District Council covers an area of 189.02 square kilometers. It is divided into 8 main areas known as:

- Trolak Pekan
- Slim River
- Slim Village
- Behrang Stesyen
- Behrang Hulu
- Bandar Behrang 2020
- Bandar Proton
- Tanjong Malim

== Demographics ==
The population was 66,103 in the 2020 census.

Ethnic groups in Tanjong Malim, 2004 census
Ethnicity	Population	Percentage
Chinese	25,125	41.33%
Malay	24,850	40.88%
Indian	9,583	15.76%
Others	1233	2.0%

== Transportation ==
Tanjung Malim railway station

Tanjung Malim station serves Tanjong Malim town. There is also a bus station.
