= Tanjung Malim–Slim River Highway =

Road in Malaysia

Federal Route 1
- Tanjung Malim–Slim River Highway
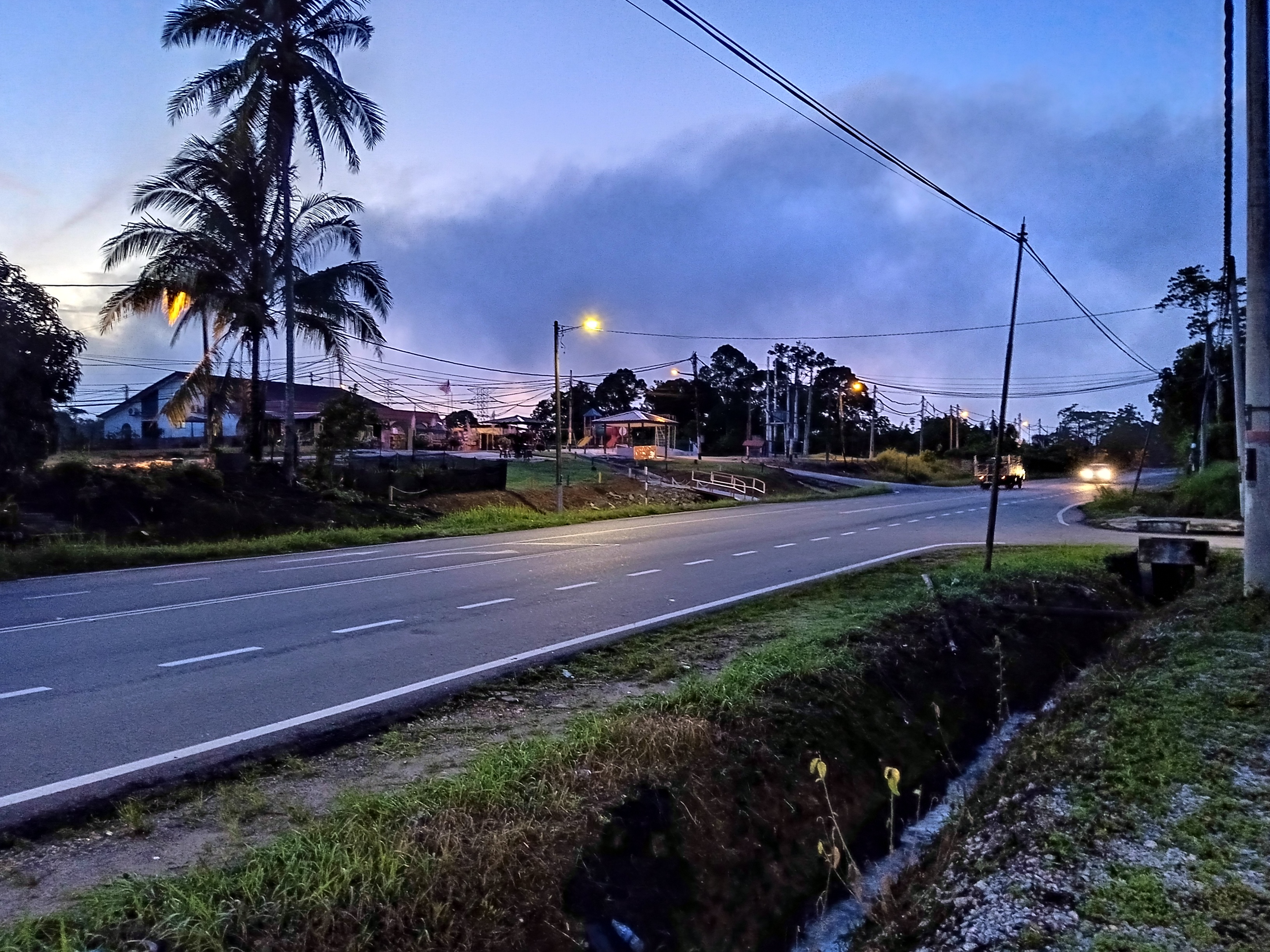

Route information
- Maintained by Malaysian Public Works Department
- Length: 20 km (12 mi)

Major junctions
- North end: Slim River
- FT 1 Federal Route 1 A134 State Route A134; A121 State Route A121; FT 193 Behrang–Tanjung Malim Highway; A124 State Route A124; FT 258 Proton City Highway; North–South Expressway Northern Route / AH2
- South end: Tanjung Malim-NSE interchange

Location
- Country: Malaysia
- Primary destinations: Ipoh, Slim, Behrang, Sabak Bernam, Kuala Lumpur

Highway system
- Highways in Malaysia; Expressways; Federal; State

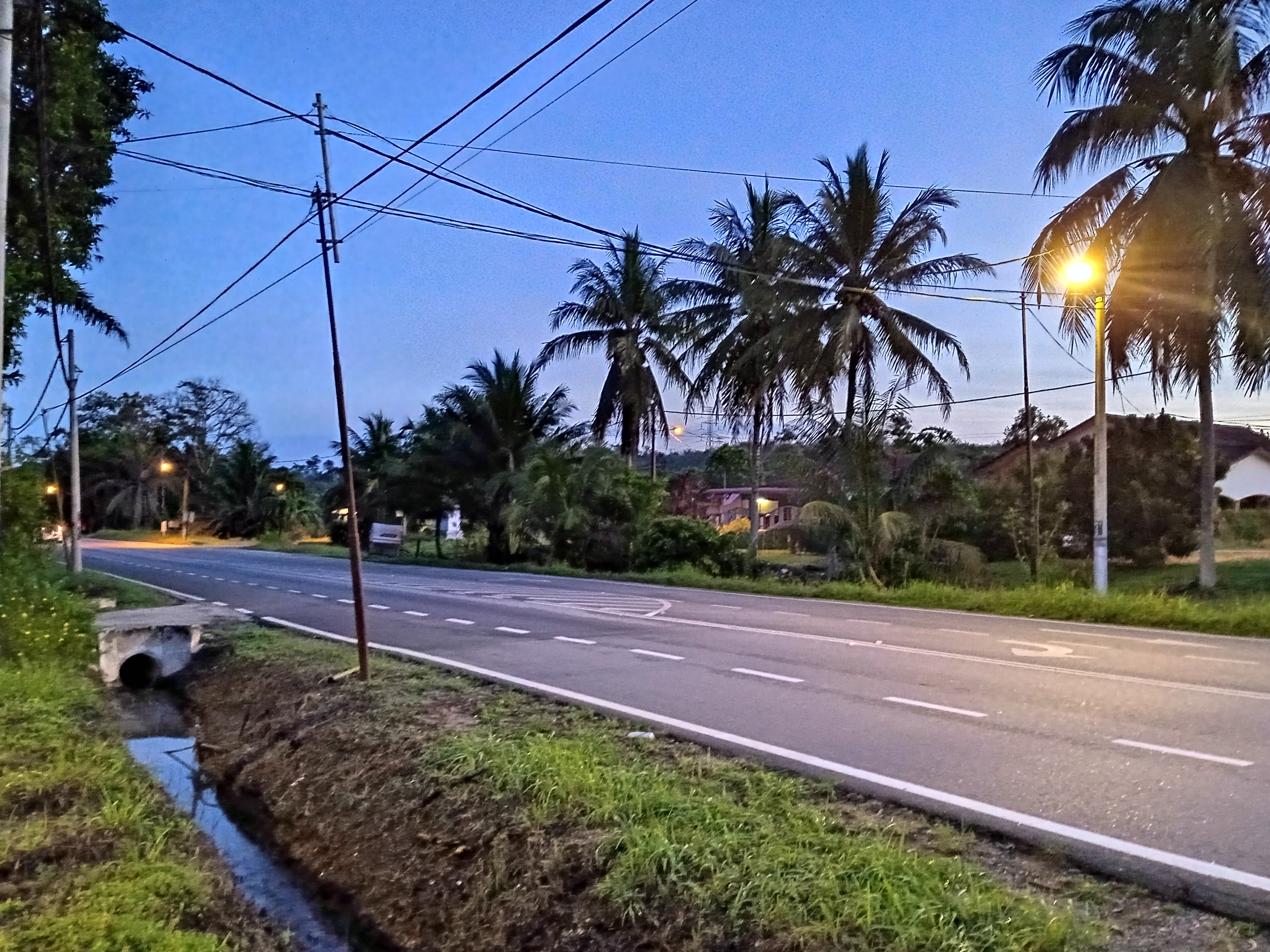
Road towards northbound (to Slim River or Ipoh).

Tanjung Malim–Slim River Highway, Federal Route 1, is a major highway in Perak and Selangor state, Malaysia. This was the first tolled highway in Malaysia.

== History ==
The road was upgraded into tolled highway in 1966 and it was opened to traffic on same year. Toll collection began on 6 am on 16 March 1966. Cars were tolled 50 cents, buses and lorries RM1 and motorcycles 20 cents. In 1994, with the completion of the North–South Expressway, the toll plaza is removed and it became a toll-free highway.

== Features ==
- Slim River Toll Plaza – The first tolled highway in Malaysia opened in 1966

== Junction lists ==
Legend:

- I/C - Interchange, I/S - Intersection, RSA - Rest and service area, OBR - Overhead bridge restaurant, R/R - Restaurant and rest plaza, L/B - Layby, V/P - Vista point, TN - tunnel, T/P - Toll plaza, BR - Bridge
- C - Cloverleaf, S - Stack, T-A - Trumpet-A, T-B - Trumpet-B, DT - Directional-T/Y, SDT - Semi-Directional-T/Y, P-Y - Partial-Y, D - Diamond, P-C - Partial cloverleaf, D-D - Diverging diamond, D-R - Direct ramp

State	District	Location	km	mi	Exit	Name	Destinations	Notes
Perak	Mualim	Slim River			Through to FT 1 Malaysia Federal Route 1			
Perak	Mualim	Slim River				Slim River-NSE I/S	North–South Expressway Northern Route / AH2 – Alor Setar, Ipoh, Sungkai, Kuala Lumpur, Kuantan, Johor Bahru	T-junctions
Perak	Mualim	Slim River				Slim River; Slim River Town I/S	Slim River Hospital	
Perak	Mualim	Slim River				Slim River; Jalan Kuala Slim I/S	A134 Jalan Kuala Slim – Kuala Slim, Slim River railway station	T-junctions
Perak	Mualim	Slim River				Slim River; Jalan Slim I/S	A121 Perak State Route A121 – Slim, Sungai Bil waterfall	T-junctions
Perak	Mualim	Slim River			Slim River bridge			
Perak	Mualim	Slim River				Kampung Balun		
Perak	Mualim	Slim River			Slim River L/B (northbound)			
Perak	Mualim	Slim River			Malaysian Public Works Department (JKR) store (Former Slim River toll plaza control centre); Historical site			
Perak	Mualim	Slim River			Former Slim River Toll Plaza Location; Historical site			
Perak	Mualim	Slim River			Slim River L/B (southbound)			
Perak	Mualim	Behrang				Kampung Sungai Behrang; Kampung Sungai Behrang I/S	Jalan Sungai Behrang – Kampung Sungai Behrang, FELDA Sungai Behrang	T-junctions
Perak	Mualim	Behrang				Sultan Azlan Shah Polytechnic	Sultan Azlan Shah Polytechnic (PSAS)	
Perak	Mualim	Behrang			Behrang river bridge			
Perak	Mualim	Behrang				Behrang; Behrang–Tanjung Malim Highway I/S	FT 193 Behrang–Tanjung Malim Highway – Behrang Ulu, Slim, Sungai Bil waterfall	T-junctions
Perak	Mualim	Behrang				Behrang; Behrang Stesen I/S	A124 Jalan Behrang Stesen – Behrang Stesen, Kampung Gedangsa, Sabak Bernam, Behrang railway stations	T-junctions
Perak	Mualim	Behrang				Behrang-NSE I/S	North–South Expressway Northern Route / AH2 – Alor Setar, Ipoh, Slim River, Kuala Lumpur, Kuantan, Johor Bahru	T-junctions
Perak	Mualim	Tanjong Malim			North–South Expressway Northern Route Crossing Bridge			
Perak	Mualim	Tanjong Malim				Wawasan Mesra Industrial Area; Wawasan Mesra I/S	Jalan Wawasan Perdana Utama	T-junctions
Perak	Mualim	Tanjong Malim				Tanjung Malim estate		
Perak	Mualim	Tanjong Malim				Proton City Highway I/C	FT 258 Proton City Highway – Proton City	Trumpet interchange
Perak	Mualim	Tanjong Malim				Tanjong Malim; Tanjung Malim Station I/S	FT 1 Jalan Stesen Tanjung Malim – Town Centre, Sabak Bernam, Tanjung Malim railway station KTM ETS	T-junctions
Perak	Mualim	Tanjong Malim				Tanjong Malim; Tanjung Malim Town I/S	FT 193 Behrang–Tanjung Malim Highway – Behrang Ulu, Slim, Proton City; Jalan Besar – Town Centre, Sultan Idris Education University (UPSI)	Junctions
Perak	Mualim	Tanjong Malim				Tanjung Malim	Taman Universiti	Junctions
Perak–Selangor border					Bernam River Bridge			
Selangor	Hulu Selangor	Bernam Jaya				Ulu Bernam	Kampung Ramli, Kampung Pinang	
Selangor	Hulu Selangor	Bernam Jaya				Ulu Bernam	Taman Bahtera	
Selangor	Hulu Selangor	Bernam Jaya			Sungai Kalumpang bridge			
Selangor	Hulu Selangor	Bernam Jaya				Tanjung Malim-NSE I/C	B44 Selangor State Route B44 – Tanjung Malim town centre, Sabak Bernam; North–South Expressway Northern Route / AH2 – Alor Setar, Ipoh, Behrang, Shah Alam, Kuantan, Johor Bahru	Half diamond interchange with railway crossing bridge
Selangor	Hulu Selangor	Bernam Jaya				Bernam Jaya; Bernam Jaya I/C	Bernam Jaya	Half diamond interchange with railway crossing bridge
Selangor	Hulu Selangor	Bernam Jaya			Through to FT 1 Malaysia Federal Route 1			
1.000 mi = 1.609 km; 1.000 km = 0.621 mi: Concurrency terminus; Closed/former

== See also ==
- Federal Route 1
