= Jalan Kuala Slim =

Road in Malaysia

Perak and Selangor State Route A134 or B134
- Jalan Kuala Slim
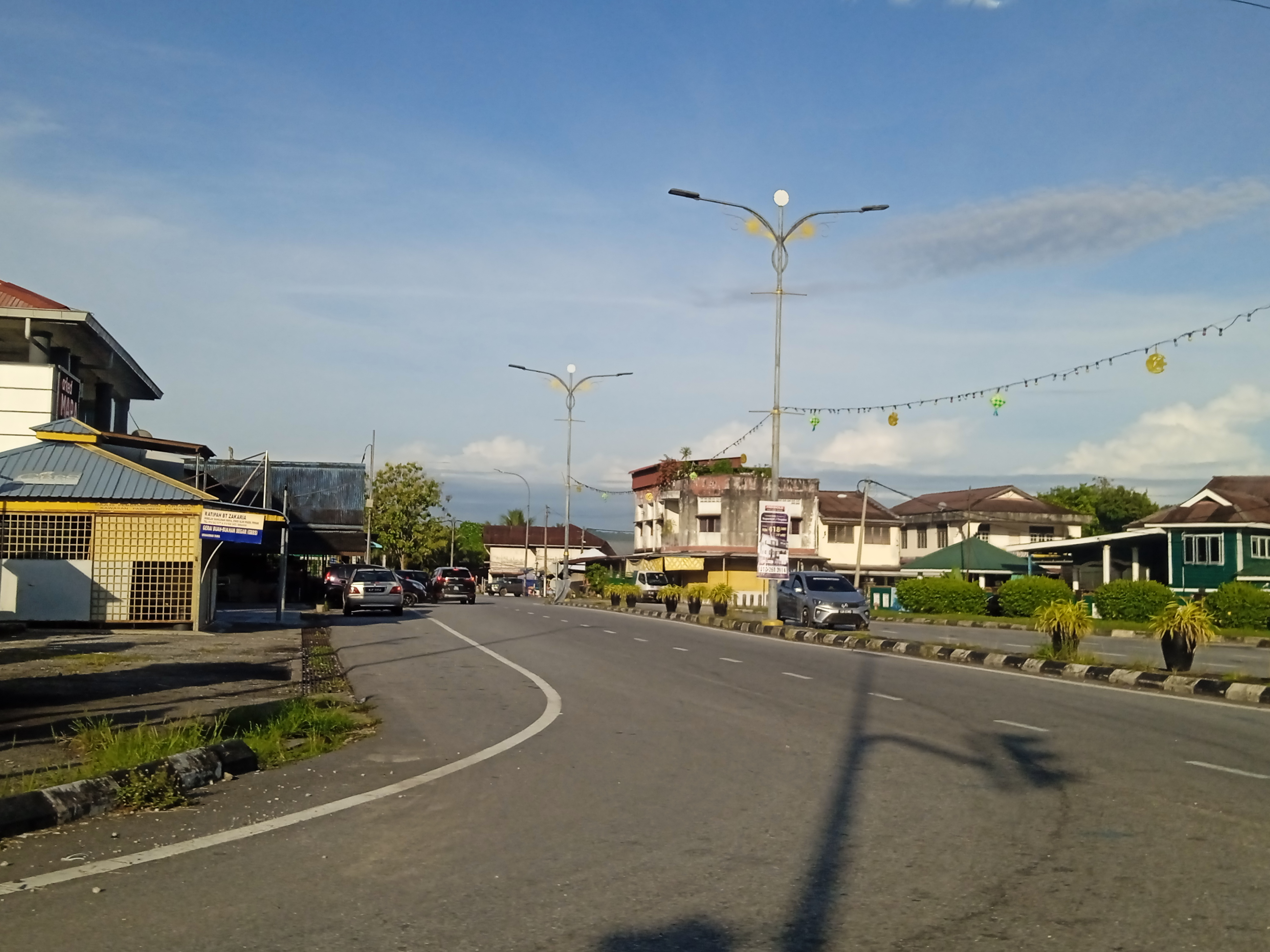

Major junctions
- East end: Slim River
- A121 State Route A121; FT 1 Federal Route 1 FT 1 Tanjung Malim–Slim River Highway
- West end: Ulu Bernam

Location
- Country: Malaysia
- Primary destinations: Kuala Slim

Highway system
- Highways in Malaysia; Expressways; Federal; State

Jalan Kuala Slim (Perak State Route A134/Selangor State Route B134) is a major road in Perak and Selangor state, Malaysia.

== Junction lists ==
Legend:

- I/C - Interchange, I/S - Intersection, RSA - Rest and service area, OBR - Overhead bridge restaurant, R/R - Restaurant and rest plaza, L/B - Layby, V/P - Vista point, TN - tunnel, T/P - Toll plaza, BR - Bridge
- C - Cloverleaf, S - Stack, T-A - Trumpet-A, T-B - Trumpet-B, DT - Directional-T/Y, SDT - Semi-Directional-T/Y, P-Y - Partial-Y, D - Diamond, P-C - Partial cloverleaf, D-D - Diverging diamond, D-R - Direct ramp

State	District	Location	km	mi	Name	Destinations	Notes
Perak	Muallim	Slim River			Slim River	A121 Jalan Slim – Slim, Sungai Bill waterfall FT 1 Malaysia Federal Route 1 – Ipoh, Bidor, Sungkai; FT 1 Tanjung Malim–Slim River Highway – Behrang, Tanjung Malim; North–South Expressway Southern Route / AH2 – Bukit Kayu Hitam, Ipoh, Kuala Lumpur, Rawang	Junctions
Perak	Muallim	Slim River			Slim River	Slim River railway station KTM ETS	
Perak	Muallim	Slim River			Railway crossing bridge		
Perak	Muallim	Slim River			Slim River	Taman Seroja	
Perak	Muallim	Kuala Slim			Sungai Terolak bridge		
Perak	Muallim	Kuala Slim			Kuala Slim	A264 Jalan Kuala Slim–Besout – FELDA Gunung Besout	Junctions
Perak–Selangor Border					Bernam River Bridge		
Selangor	Hulu Selangor	Ulu Bernam			Ulu Bernam		
1.000 mi = 1.609 km; 1.000 km = 0.621 mi
