= Behrang (disambiguation) =

Behrang, also known as Behrang Stesen, is a small town on Perak-Selangor border, Malaysia.

Behrang may refer to:

== Places ==
- Behrang 2020, also known as Bandar Baru Behrang, township in Perak, Malaysia
- Behrang – Proton City Highway, Malaysia
- Behrang railway station, Malaysia
- Behrang (state constituency), state constituency in Perak, Malaysia

== Persons ==
- Behrang Safari (born 1985), Iranian-born Swedish international footballer

== See also ==
- Behrangi (disambiguation)
