= Trolak =

Estate town in Perak, Malaysia

Coordinates: 3°53′N 101°23′E

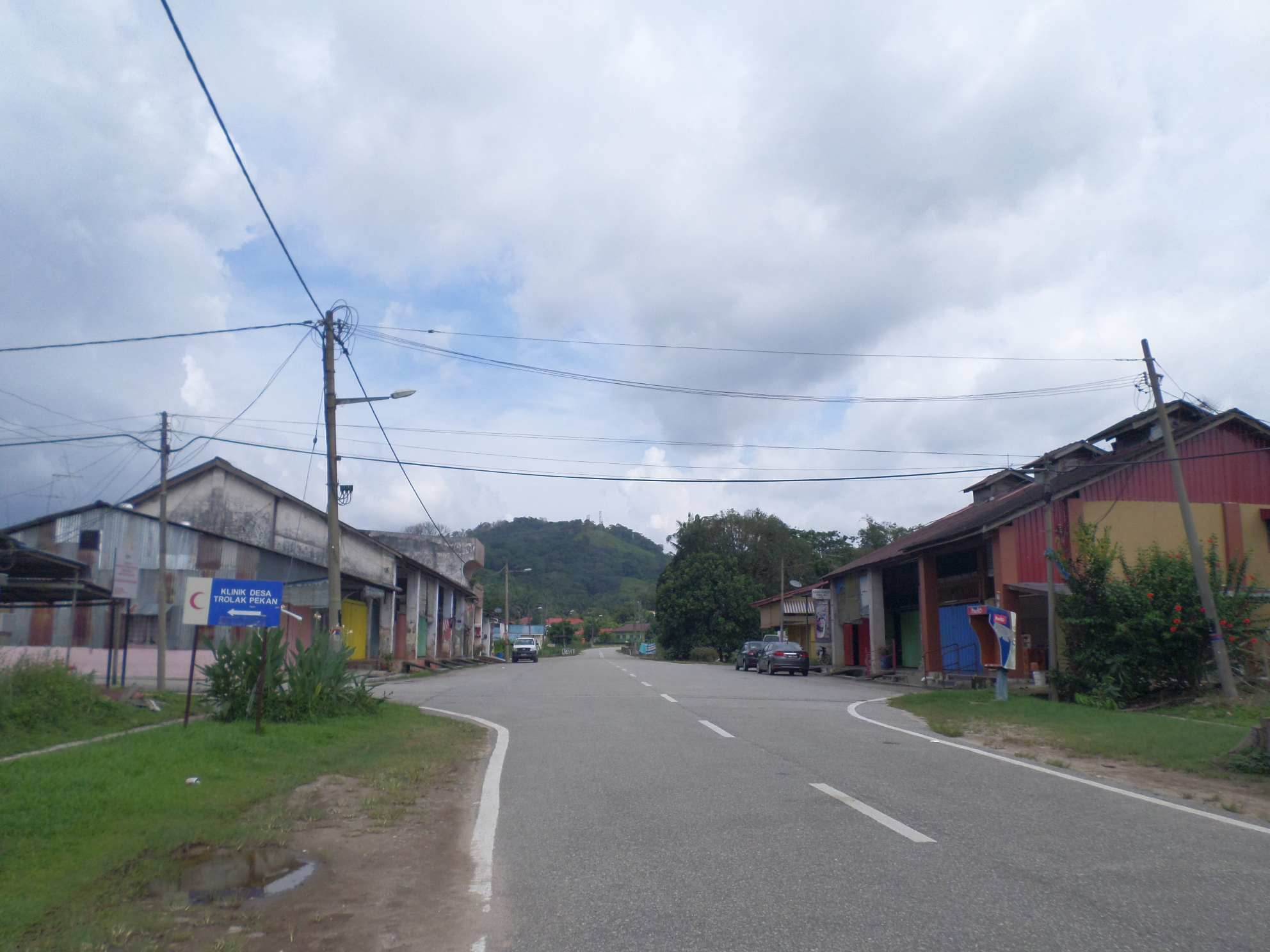
Trolak

Trolak in Muallim District

Trolak (Jawi: ترولق; Chinese: 地罗叻, Tamil: துரோலாக்) is a small estate town in Mukim Slim, Muallim District, Perak, Malaysia. It houses many FELDA explorers since circa 1960s with a rubber plantation, later changed into an oil palm plantation.

The name is said to have originated from a word called 'tarak lah' (lit:There's nothing) which was made from the progress of spelling and comprehension of the geographic officials in Perak.

Trolak is home to one of the MARA Junior Science College which first open it doors in 2008. Although the name of the school is MRSM FELDA, it is commonly known by the local as MRSM Trolak.
