= Behrang–Tanjung Malim Highway =

Road in Malaysia

Federal Route 193
- Behrang–Tanjung Malim Highway

Route information
- Length: 13.28 km (8.25 mi)

Major junctions
- North end: Behrang
- A121 Jalan Slim; FT 258 Proton City Highway; FT 1 Tanjung Malim–Slim River Highway
- South end: Tanjung Malim

Location
- Country: Malaysia
- Primary destinations: Behrang; Slim; Behrang Ulu; Proton City; Tanjung Malim

Highway system
- Highways in Malaysia; Expressways; Federal; State

Behrang–Tanjung Malim Highway, Federal Route 193 (formerly Perak state route 124 and state route 121 (Behrang Ulu–Tanjung Malim side)), is a major highway in Perak, Malaysia. The 13.2 km (8.2 mi) federal highway connects Behrang in the north to Tanjung Malim in the south. It also acts as a bypass for the Tanjung Malim town and Tanjung Malim–Slim River Highway (Federal Route 1).

The kilometre zero of the Federal Route 193 starts at Tanjung Malim. The Kilometre Zero monument is erected near Pos Malaysia post office at Jalan Ketoyong, Tanjung Malim.

== Features ==
- Proton City

At most sections, the Federal Route 193 was built under the JKR R5 road standard, allowing maximum speed limit of up to 90 km/h.

Overlaps: Behrang Ulu–Tanjung Malim: A121 Jalan Slim

No alternate routes or sections with motorcycle lanes.

== List of interchanges ==
km	Exit	Interchange	To	Remarks
	19300	Behrang; Behrang Junctions	FT 1 Tanjung Malim–Slim River Highway North; FT 1 Ipoh; FT 1 Slim River; North–South Expressway Northern Route AH2 North–South Expressway Northern Route; North; Bukit Kayu Hitam; Ipoh; Sungkai South; FT 1 Tanjung Malim; A-- Behrang Station; B44 Sabak Bernam; North–South Expressway Northern Route AH2 North–South Expressway Northern Route; South; Kuala Lumpur; Rawang; Tanjung Malim	T-junctions
FT 193 Behrang–Tanjung Malim Highway; Start/End of highway
	19301	Behrang Ulu; Behrang Ulu Junctions	North; A121 Jalan Slim; Slim; Slim River; Sungai Bil waterfall	T-junctions
	19302	Proton City; Proton City Junctions	East; Jalan PC10; Proton City; Proton cars assembly plant	T-junctions
	19303	Proton City; Proton City Highway Interchange	FT 258 Proton City Highway West; FT 1 Ipoh; FT 1 Behrang; North–South Expressway Northern Route AH2 North–South Expressway Northern Route; Bukit Kayu Hitam; Ipoh; Kuala Lumpur; Rawang East; FT 258 Proton City; Kampus Sultan Azlan Shah UPSI; Kolej Aminuddin Baki; Kolej Zaaba	Cloverleaf interchange
	19304	Taman Bernam Prima (North) Junctions	Taman Bernam Prima; Kota Malim Prima	T-junctions
	19305	Taman Bernam Prima (South) Junctions	Taman Bernam Prima; Kota Malim Prima	T-junctions
		Taman Bernam		
FT 193 Behrang–Proton City Highway; Start/End of highway
	19306	Tanjung Malim; Tanjung Malim Town Junctions	FT 1 Tanjung Malim–Slim River Highway North; FT 1 Ipoh; FT 1 Behrang; North–South Expressway Northern Route AH2 North–South Expressway Northern Route; North; Bukit Kayu Hitam; Ipoh; Slim River South; FT 1 Tanjung Malim; FT 1 Kuala Kubu Bharu; B44 Sabak Bernam; North–South Expressway Northern Route AH2 North–South Expressway Northern Route; South; Kuala Lumpur; Rawang; Lembah Beringin	Junctions
		Tanjung Malim; Universiti Pendidikan Sultan Idris (UPSI)	Universiti Pendidikan Sultan Idris (UPSI)	T-junction
		Tanjung Malim; Masjid Jamek Tanjung Malim (Mosque)		
FT 193; 0		Tanjung Malim	Jalan Ketoyong West; Tanjung Malim Pos Malaysia post office East; Jalan Keliling UPSI; Universiti Pendidikan Sultan Idris (UPSI)	T-junction
