= Perak State Route A121 =

Road in Malaysia

Perak Route 121
- Jalan Slim

Route information
- Length: 23 km (14 mi)

Major junctions
- West end: Slim River
- FT 1 Federal Route 1 FT 1 Tanjung Malim–Slim River Highway; FT 193 Behrang–Proton City Highway
- South end: Tanjung Malim

Location
- Country: Malaysia
- Primary destinations: Slim; Behrang Ulu

Highway system
- Highways in Malaysia; Expressways; Federal; State

Jalan Slim (Perak state route A121) is a major road in Perak, Malaysia. The road used to be Federal Road 1.

== List of junctions ==
| Km | Exit | Junctions | To | Remarks |
|---|---|---|---|---|
| | | Slim River | West; A134 Jalan Kuala Slim; Kuala Slim North; FT 1 Ipoh; FT 1 Bidor; FT 1 Sungkai; North–South Expressway Southern Route AH2 North–South Expressway Northern Route; Bukit Kayu Hitam; Ipoh; Kuala Lumpur; Rawang South; FT 1 Tanjung Malim–Slim River Highway; FT 1 Tanjung Malim; FT 1 Behrang | T-junctions |
| | | Kampung Banting | | |
| | | Kampung Naram | | |
| | | Kampung Tambak | | |
| | | Kampung Penderas | | |
| | | Kampung Sawa | | |
| | | Slim | | |
| | | Sungai Slim bridge | | |
| | | Kampung Gesa | | |
| | | Kampung Sungai Jurong | | |
| | | Kampung Sungai Bil | Kampung Sungai Bil; Sungai Bil waterfall | T-junctions |
| | | Kampung Sungai Dara | | |
| | | Kampung Behrang Ulu | | |
| | | Behrang Ulu | FT 193 Behrang–Tanjung Malim Highway West; FT 193 Behrang; FT 1 Slim River; North–South Expressway Southern Route AH2 North–South Expressway Northern Route; Bukit Kayu Hitam; Ipoh; Kuala Lumpur; Rawang | T-junctions |
| | | Behrang Ulu–Tanjung Malim | see also FT 193 Behrang–Tanjung Malim Highway | |
