= Behrang railway station =

Malaysian train station

Coordinates: 3.7454592°N 101.4495403°E

Behrang

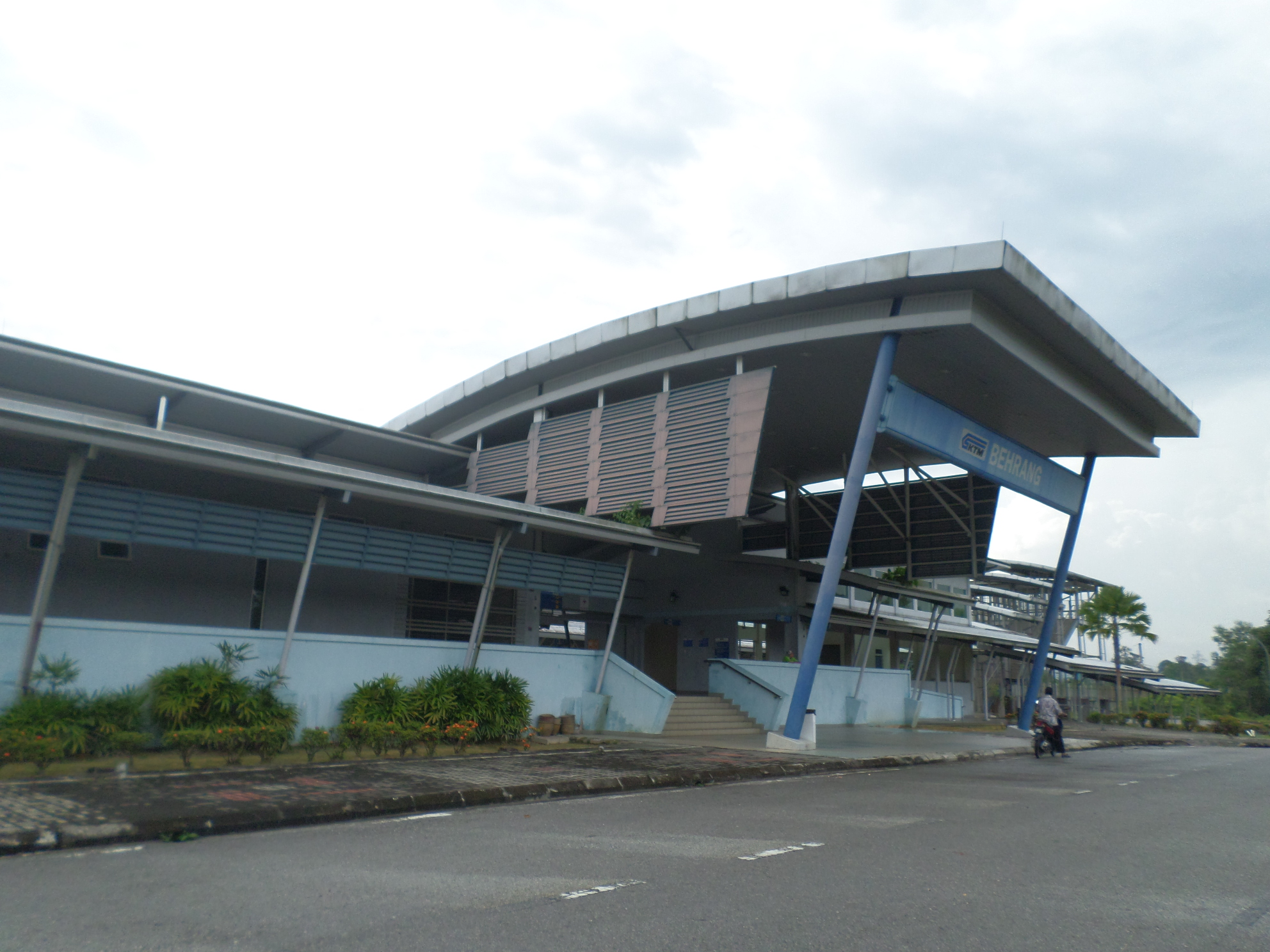

General information
- Other names: Malay: بيهراڠ (Jawi); Chinese: 美冷; Tamil: பேராங்
- Location: Behrang, Perak, Malaysia.
- Owner: Keretapi Tanah Melayu
- Line: West Coast Line
- Platforms: 1 side platform 1 island platform
- Tracks: 3

Construction
- Parking: Available, free.
- Accessible: Y

History
- Electrified: 2007

Former services
Preceding station	Keretapi Tanah Melayu	Following station
Closed as part of the KTM ETS
Slim River towards Padang Besar	West Coast Line	Tanjung Malim towards Woodlands
Location

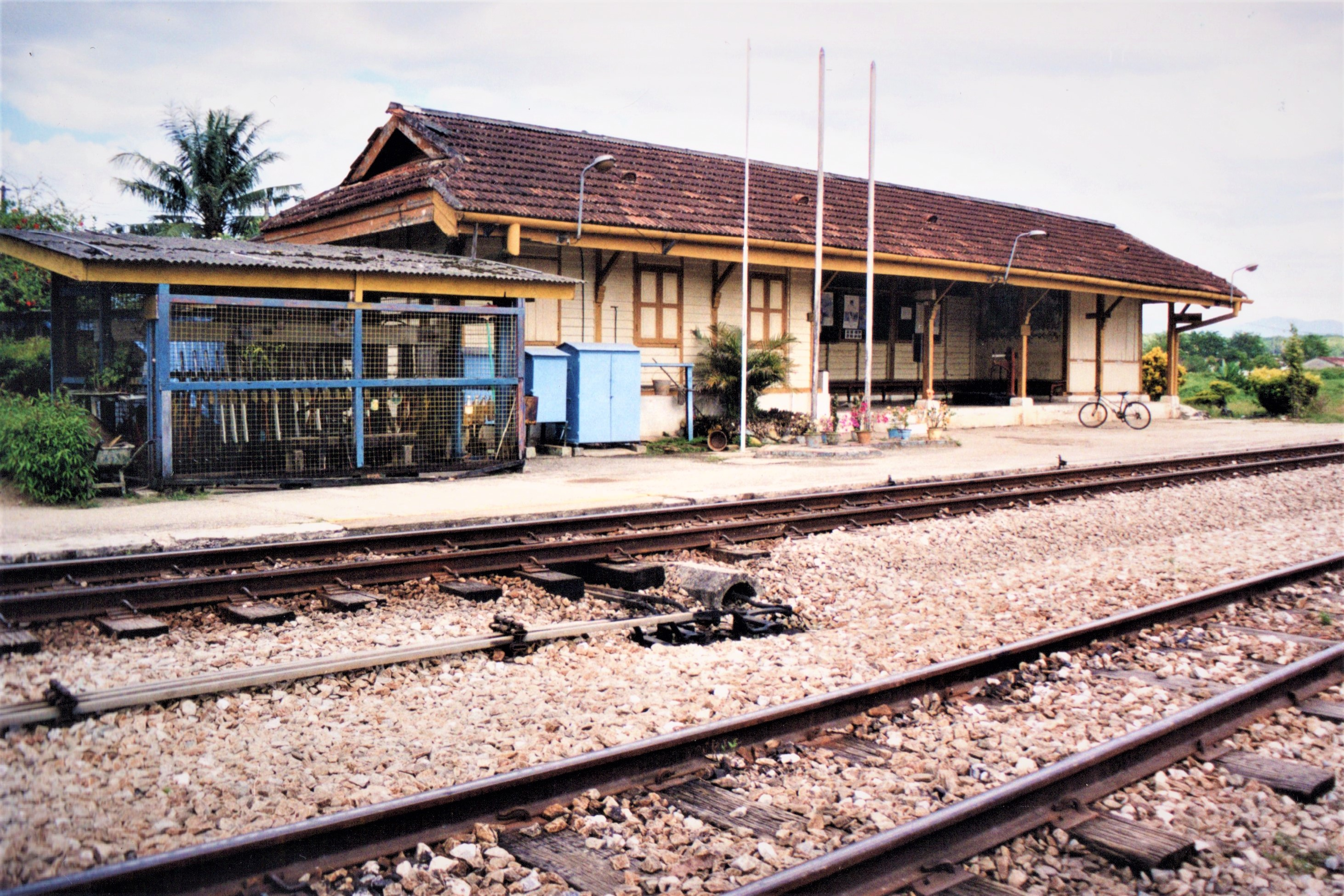
The original Behrang KTM railway station in 2002, which was demolished and rebuilt for the Rawang-Ipoh electrification double tracking project, completed in 2008.

The Behrang railway station is a Malaysian train station located approximately 500m to the Southeast of the town of Behrang Stesen in Perak. The station demolished and rebuilt for the Rawang-Ipoh Electrified Double Tracking Project in 2008. At present, the station is not in used as the KTM ETS, which services the line, does not stop here.

== Location and locality ==
Located nearby Behrang Stesen town in Muallim District of Perak, it was intended to serve the nearby areas of Behrang as well as Sultan Azlan Shah Polytechnic (3.6 km away).

== See also ==
- Rail transport in Malaysia
