= Proton City Highway =

Road in Malaysia

Federal Route 258
- Proton City Highway

Route information
- Length: 3.81 km (2.37 mi)

Major junctions
- West end: Tanjung Malim North Interchange
- FT 1 Tanjung Malim–Slim River Highway; FT 193 Behrang–Tanjung Malim Highway
- South end: Proton City

Location
- Country: Malaysia
- Primary destinations: Kampus Sultan Azlan Shah UPSI; Kolej Aminuddin Baki; Kolej Zaaba

Highway system
- Highways in Malaysia; Expressways; Federal; State

Proton City Highway, Federal Route 258, is a major highway in Perak, Malaysia. The 3.81 km (2.4 mi) federal highway connects Tanjung Malim North Interchange of the Tanjung Malim-Slim River Highway (Federal Route 1) to Proton City in the east. It is a main route to Proton City. The kilometre zero is located at Tanjung Malim North Interchange.

== Features ==
At most sections, the Federal Route 258 was built under the JKR R5 road standard, allowing maximum speed limit of up to 90 km/h.

There are no overlaps, alternate routes, or sections with motorcycle lanes.

== List of interchanges ==
km	Exit	Interchange	To	Remarks
	25801	Tanjung Malim; Tanjung Malim North Interchange	FT 1 Tanjung Malim–Slim River Highway North; FT 1 Ipoh; FT 1 Behrang; North–South Expressway Northern Route AH2 North–South Expressway Northern Route; North; Bukit Kayu Hitam; Ipoh; Slim River South; FT 1 Tanjung Malim; FT 1 Kuala Kubu Bharu; B44 Sabak Bernam; North–South Expressway Northern Route AH2 North–South Expressway Northern Route; South; Kuala Lumpur; Rawang; Lembah Beringin	Trumpet interchange
FT 258 Proton City Highway; Start/End of highway
		U-Turn	U-Turn	
		Tanjung Malim Estate		
		U-Turn	U-Turn	
	25802	Behrang–Tanjung Malim Highway Interchange	FT 193 Behrang–Tanjung Malim Highway North; FT 193 Behrang; FT 1 Slim River; A121 Slim; North–South Expressway Northern Route AH2 North–South Expressway Northern Route; Bukit Kayu Hitam; Ipoh; Slim River South; FT 193 Tanjung Malim; FT 1 Kuala Kubu Bharu; North–South Expressway Northern Route AH2 North–South Expressway Northern Route; Kuala Lumpur; Rawang; Lembah Beringin	Cloverleaf interchange
		Kolej Aminuddin Baki; Kolej Zaaba	Kolej Aminuddin Baki; Kolej Zaaba	LILO exit
	25803	KSAS UPSI Interchange	Kampus Sultan Azlan Shah UPSI	Diamond interchange
FT 258 Proton City Highway; Start/End of highway
Proton City
	25804	Proton City; Proton City Roundabout	North; Jalan Bunga Tanjung; Proton City townships Jalan PC10 West; Proton cars assembly plant East; Proton City townships	Roundabout
