= Behrangi =

Behrangi (in Persian بهرنگی) is a common Iranian family name. The given name equivalent is Persian بهرنگ

Behrangi may refer to:

- Mohammad Reza Behrangi (born 1944), Iranian educational scientist and university professor
- Samad Behrangi (1939–1967), Azeri-Iranian teacher, writer, social critic, folklorist and translator

== See also ==
- Behrang (disambiguation)
