= Bernam Jaya =

Coordinates: 3°46′N 100°59′E

Bernam Jaya is a new Malaysian township in Hulu Selangor constituency in northern Selangor built by Selangor State Development Corporation (PKNS), close to the Perak-Selangor border.

== Background ==
The construction was aided by private developers, along the model of the Kota Damansara township. The township, comprising over 800 acres (3.2 km^{2}), is located between Kuala Kubu Bharu and Tanjung Malim. The government acquired the land which included former palm oil plantations, from private real estate companies in 1997; at a time when much development was focused on the southern part of the state (around the airport), Selangor's State Development Corporation looked to the northern corridor. The site, close to the North–South Expressway, was intended primarily for employees of the nearby Proton City automotive complex and the Universiti Pendidikan Sultan Idris.

== Transportation ==
=== Public transportation ===
Setara Jaya bus 154 to Tanjong Malim (bus terminal only), Kuala Kubu Bharu and Tanjung Malim.

=== Car ===
Bernam Jaya lies along national highway Federal Route 1. It is also accessible via North-South Expressway Northern Route exit 121 Tanjong Malim.

== Bibliography ==
- Banoo, Sreerema (2003). "City & Country: A northern effort by PKNS." The Edge Malaysia. June 23.
- Ng, Eileen (2003). "Private Role in New Township." New Straits Times. August 30.
