= Sultan Azlan Shah Polytechnic =

Polytechnic in Malaysia

Coordinates: 3.770015°N 101.450107°E

Politeknik Sultan Azlan Shah
- Type: Public
- Established: 1 March 2002
- Founder: Ministry of Education
- Director: Puan Hjh. Rusmina Ismail
- Location: 35950 Behrang Stesen, Perak, Malaysia, Behrang, Perak, Malaysia
- Abbreviation: PSAS
- Website: http://www.psas.edu.my

The Sultan Azlan Shah Polytechnic (PSAS; formerly known as Polytechnic of Tanjong Malim or PTM) is a polytechnic institute in Behrang, Perak, Malaysia. It was established by the Ministry of Education on March 1, 2002 as the 15th polytechnic in the country.

== History ==
PSAS, formerly known as Tanjung Malim Polytechnic (PTM), is the 15th Polytechnic established by the Malaysian Ministry of Education. PTM started operating in the Technical High School building, Slim River on March 1, 2002. On April 1, 2003, PTM moved to its own 110 acres in Behrang, Perak. The PTM campus is equipped with various infrastructure suitable as a center of higher learning. The first group of 553 students registered on 6 July 2003.

On March 27, 2004, PTM officially came under the Malaysian Ministry of Higher Education by offering 7 certificate programs and 8 diploma programs at that time. On 7 May 2005, PTM was inaugurated by His Majesty the Sultan of Perak, Sultan Azlan Muhibbuddin Shah with a new name, Sultan Azlan Shah Polytechnic.

Starting in July 2010, PSAS focused on 14 Study Programs at the Diploma level and 1 Study Program at the Advanced Diploma level, which is the Advanced Diploma in Automotive Design and Manufacturing Engineering which started operating in July 2010. This program is a joint venture between Proton Holdings Berhad and the Sultan Polytechnic. Azlan Shah who uses the Work Based Learning (WBL) approach. To date, a total of 89 students have registered in the study program and graduated at the 10th Convocation Ceremony. Other study programs are managed by 4 main Departments at PSAS, namely the Department of Civil Engineering, the Department of Electrical Engineering, the Department of Mechanical Engineering and the Department of Commerce, supported by 2 supporting departments namely the Department of General Studies and the Department of Mathematics and Computer Science. The PSAS administration is assisted by 14 support and service units.

After 13 years, PSAS took a further step forward by offering a Bachelor's Degree program in the field of Automotive Manufacturing, the year 2014 saw the first selection of 25 students for the Bachelor's Degree in Automotive Manufacturing begin their study session at PSAS. The year 2015 also made history in PSAS's achievements when it successfully obtained the Gold Award in the APACC audit series held at the beginning of 2015. This is the first international achievement by PSAS in Institutional Management.

== Courses offered ==
- Bachelor of Manufacturing Engineering Technology (Automotive Design)
- Diploma in Mechanical Engineering
- Diploma in Mechanical Engineering (Automotive)
- Diploma in Mechanical Engineering (Manufacturing)
- Diploma in Mechatronic Engineering
- Diploma in Civil Engineering
- Diploma in Electrical engineering
- Diploma in Electronic engineering
- Diploma in Electronic engineering (Computer)
- Diploma in Accounting
- Diploma in Marketing
- Diploma in Retailing
- Diploma in Business Studies
