= MRSM FELDA =

MRSM FELDA Kampus Tun Abdul Razak

Location
- Jalan Meranti 2 Sungkai, Perak, 35600; Malaysia
- Coordinates: 3.9219439°N 101.3481454°E

Information
- School type: Boarding school
- Motto: Transformasi Menuju Kejuaraan
- Established: 2008
- Yearbook: Zenith
- Website: af.mrsm.edu.my

MRSM FELDA or MJSC FELDA is a college in Sungkai, Batang Padang District, Perak, Malaysia. It is one of the MARA Junior Science College group of co-educational boarding schools. The school was named Kampus Tun Abdul Razak after Tun Abdul Razak, the founder of FELDA. The school is built on an 86.06 acres (34.83 ha) area within Feldajaya Utara. The school is the most expensive and the second-largest MRSM school in Malaysia, and can currently accommodate up to 1000 students from the age of 13 (Form 1) to 17 (Form 5). Some of the local refer the school as MRSM Trolak after the nearest township.

== History ==
MARA Junior Science College FELDA is the 37th college established by the Majlis Amanah Rakyat (MARA) and the Federal Land Development Authority (FELDA), from an idea by the Y.A.B. Dato' Sri Najib bin Tun Abdul Razak who admired the college's accomplishments in the SPM and PMR. Following the signing of the agreement, which was named the "Perjanjian Kerjasama Antara MARA Dan FELDA on 30 March 2007. MJSC FELDA was the fifth MJSC built in Perak.

The college officially began operations on 1 December 2007, led by the Principal Saleh bin Osman, assisted by the Deputy Principal of Academic Affairs and Student Affairs Deputy Principal and 19 teachers and 16 employees. The college has received a total of 210 pilot group of students who are Form 1 students on 18 February 2008.

The new building, developed on a site measuring 86.06 acres (34.83 ha) in North Feldajaya, became fully operational on January 4, 2010. Students from Form 1 were called back to continue their studies at the MJSC FELDA. The building was named of "Kampus Tun Abdul Razak" on July 7, "Hari Peneroka Kebangsaan" 2010.

MJSC FELDA has appeared in the Malay drama Aku Mahu Terbang, in a scene showing that the main character stays at Aspura Block.

== Alumni ==
The alumni group of the college, MRSM Kuala Kubu Bharu, was established in 2012 by MRSM Felda's SPM leavers of 2011, by nine co-founders consisting of the first SPM Batch who later became the core members and committees. As of 14 August 2013, the Alumni association is registered under the Malaysian Registrar of Societies. The first President of ALFA was Rifhan Hafiz, who was also the head of the Student Representative Council of 2010/2011. Qawi Elias who is one of the co-founders now currently serve as the Club's Chairman.

== See also ==
MARA Junior Science College
