= Slim River railway station =

Malaysian train station

Coordinates: 3.82694°N 101.402°E

Slim River

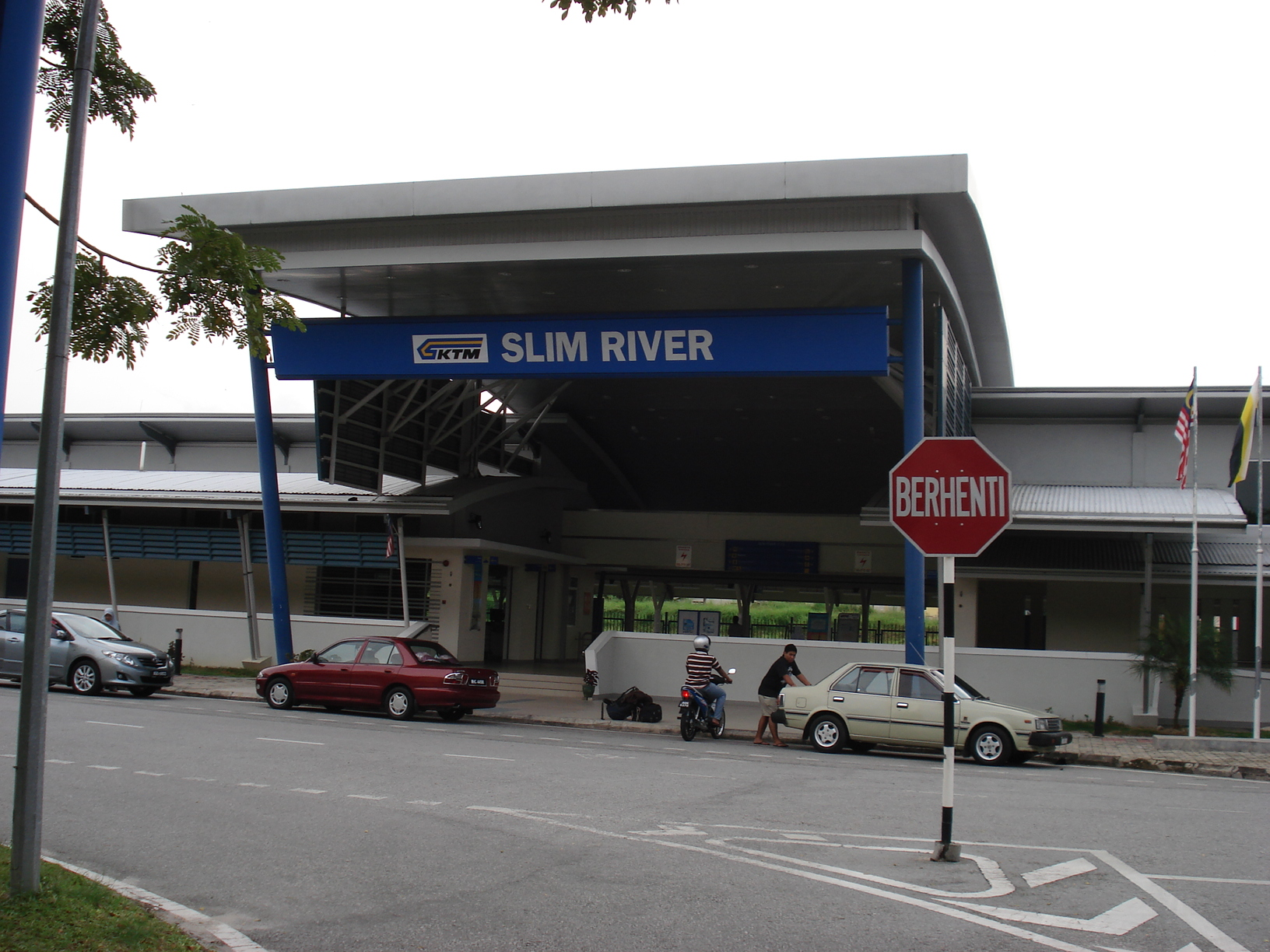

General information
- Other names: Malay: سليم ريۏر (Jawi); Chinese: 仕林河; Tamil: சிலிம் ரிவர்
- Location: Slim River, Perak, Malaysia.
- System: | Inter-city rail station
- Owner: Keretapi Tanah Melayu
- Line: West Coast Line
- Platforms: 2 side platform
- Tracks: 2

Construction
- Parking: Available, free.
- Accessible: Y

History
- Opened: 1903
- Rebuilt: 2007
- Electrified: 2007

Services
Preceding station	ETS	Following station
Sungkai towards Ipoh	KL Sentral–Ipoh (Gold)	Tanjung Malim towards KL Sentral
Former services
Preceding station	Keretapi Tanah Melayu	Following station
Former KTM Intercity service
Sungkai towards Padang Besar	West Coast Line	Behrang towards Woodlands
Preceding station	ETS	Following station
Former ETS service terminated on 1 January 2026
Sungkai towards Ipoh	KL Sentral–Ipoh (Silver)	Tanjung Malim towards KL Sentral
Location

The Slim River railway station is a Malaysian train station stationed at the north eastern side of and named after the town of Slim River, Muallim District, Perak.

The station is owned by Keretapi Tanah Melayu (KTM) and provides KTM ETS services. Built in 1903, the original station is among the oldest of the railway stations in Malaysia. In March 2007, as part of the Rawang–Ipoh Electrified Double Tracking Project, it was rebuilt, with the old station building being retained. At one end of this station, there is a freight yard. It was made prior to the project.

== Location and locality ==
The station is located exactly in Slim River town, and is accessible by road either from Federal Route 1 or Route A134 (Besout - Kuala Slim - Slim River).

The station not only serves Slim River and the surrounding areas, but also the FELDA Trolak and FELDA Besout settlement areas due to their reasonably near distance to the station, as well as the Ulu Bernam estates. The Slim River Vocational College and the Trolak campus of the MARA Junior Science College are also located near the station.

== See also ==
- Rail transport in Malaysia
