= Behrang Stesen =

Town in Muallim District, Perak, Malaysia

- Town
- Behrang Stesen; Behrang Stesen

Other transcription(s)
  - Jawi: بيهراڠ ستيسين
  - Chinese: 美冷车站 (Simplified) 美冷車站 (Traditional); Měi lěng chēzhàn
  - Tamil: பெஹராங் நிலையம் Peharāṅ nilaiyam (Transliteration)
- Behrang Stesen in Perak Behrang Stesen (Malaysia) Behrang Stesen (Southeast Asia)
- Coordinates: 3°44′49″N 101°27′11.4″E
- Country: Malaysia
- State: Perak
- District: Muallim District
- Time zone: UTC+8 (MST)
- Postal code: 35950
- Area code: 05

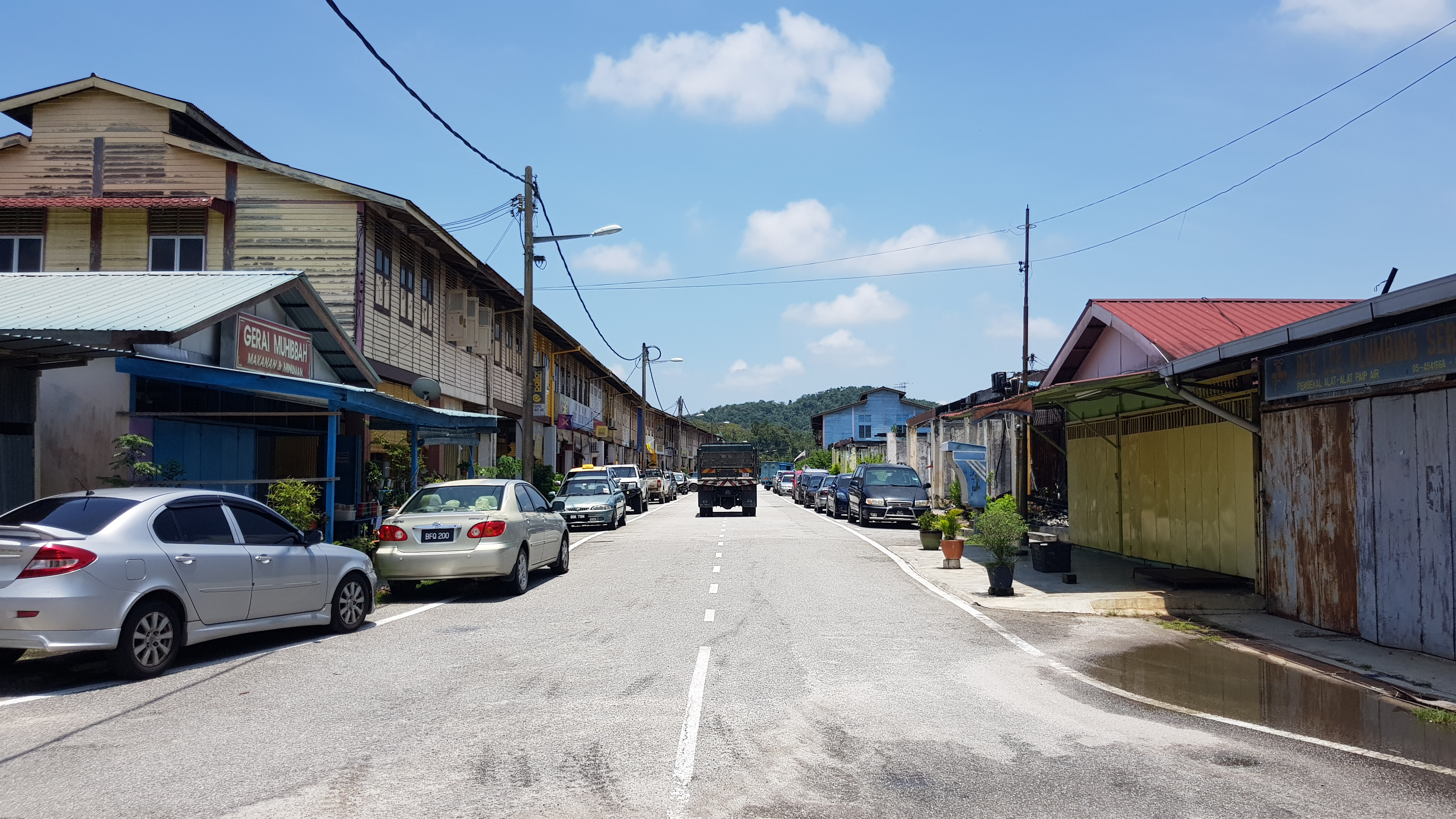
Jalan Besar, Behrang Stesen (April 2021)

Behrang Stesen (Malay: [behraŋ steɪsən], Jawi: بيهراڠ ستيسين; Chinese: 美冷车站; Tamil: பெஹராங் நிலையம்) is a small town located in Muallim District, Perak, Malaysia. It is situated within the parliamentary constituency of Tanjung Malim and is located approximately equidistant – 12 km (7.5 mi) on either side – to Tanjung Malim at its the southeast and to Slim River to its northwest respectively.

== History ==
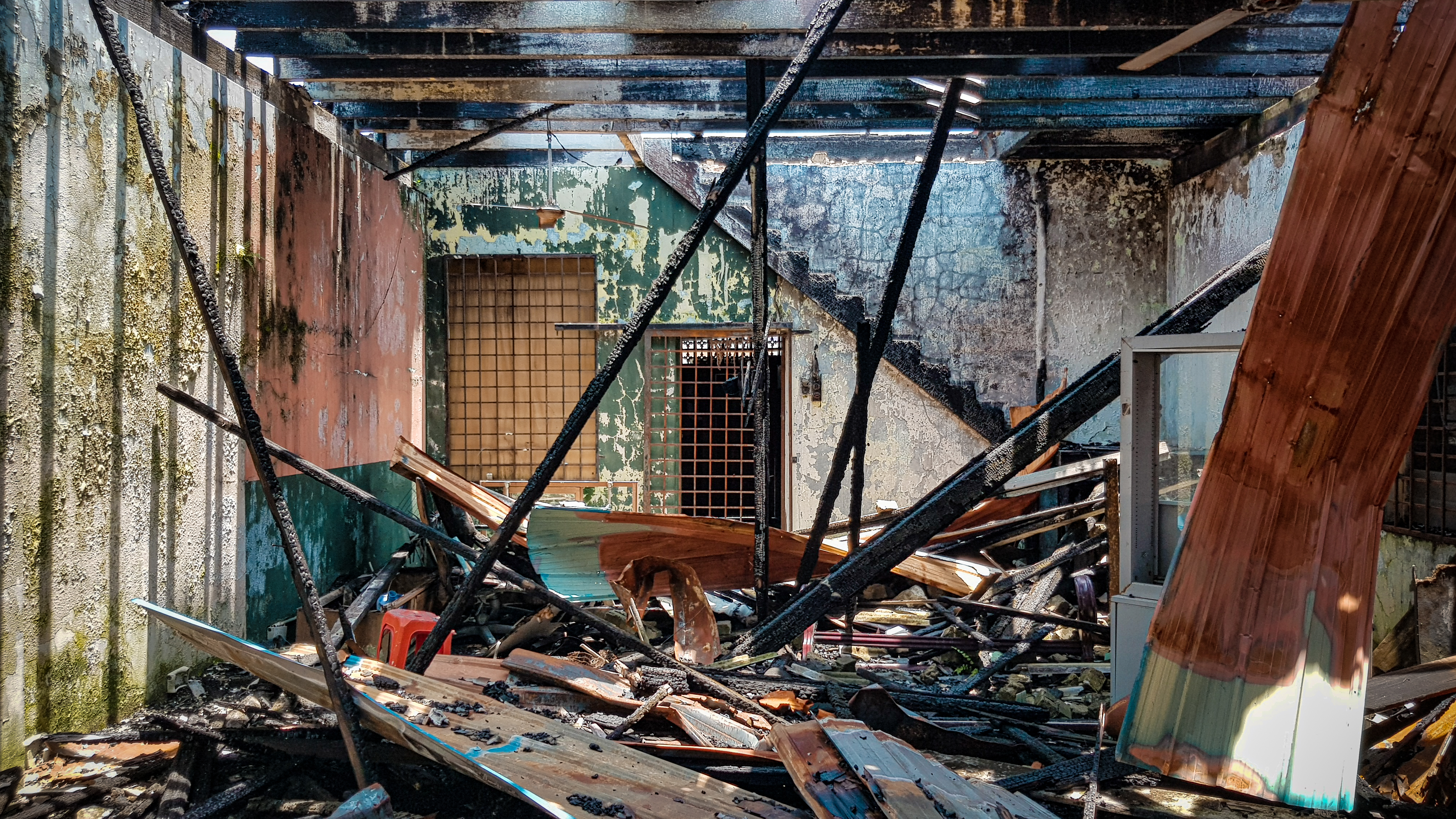
Aftermath of the March 2020 fire at Behrang Stesen

On 28th March 2020 at around 12:22am, a large fire razed an entire row of 11 wooden shophouses previously rebuilt in 1969 (after a similar-sized fire had first raged in the village). A spokesman for the Perak Division of the Fire and Rescue Department of Malaysia (JBPM Perak) confirmed that firefighters from nearby Slim River worked together with groups of volunteers from Slim Village, Kepong and Pekan Baru, as well as additional units from Kuala Kubu Bharu and Bidor to put out the fire. It was reported that though an estimated 70 percent of the aforementioned B-class shophouses were destroyed in the inferno, the 55 affected residents were safe.

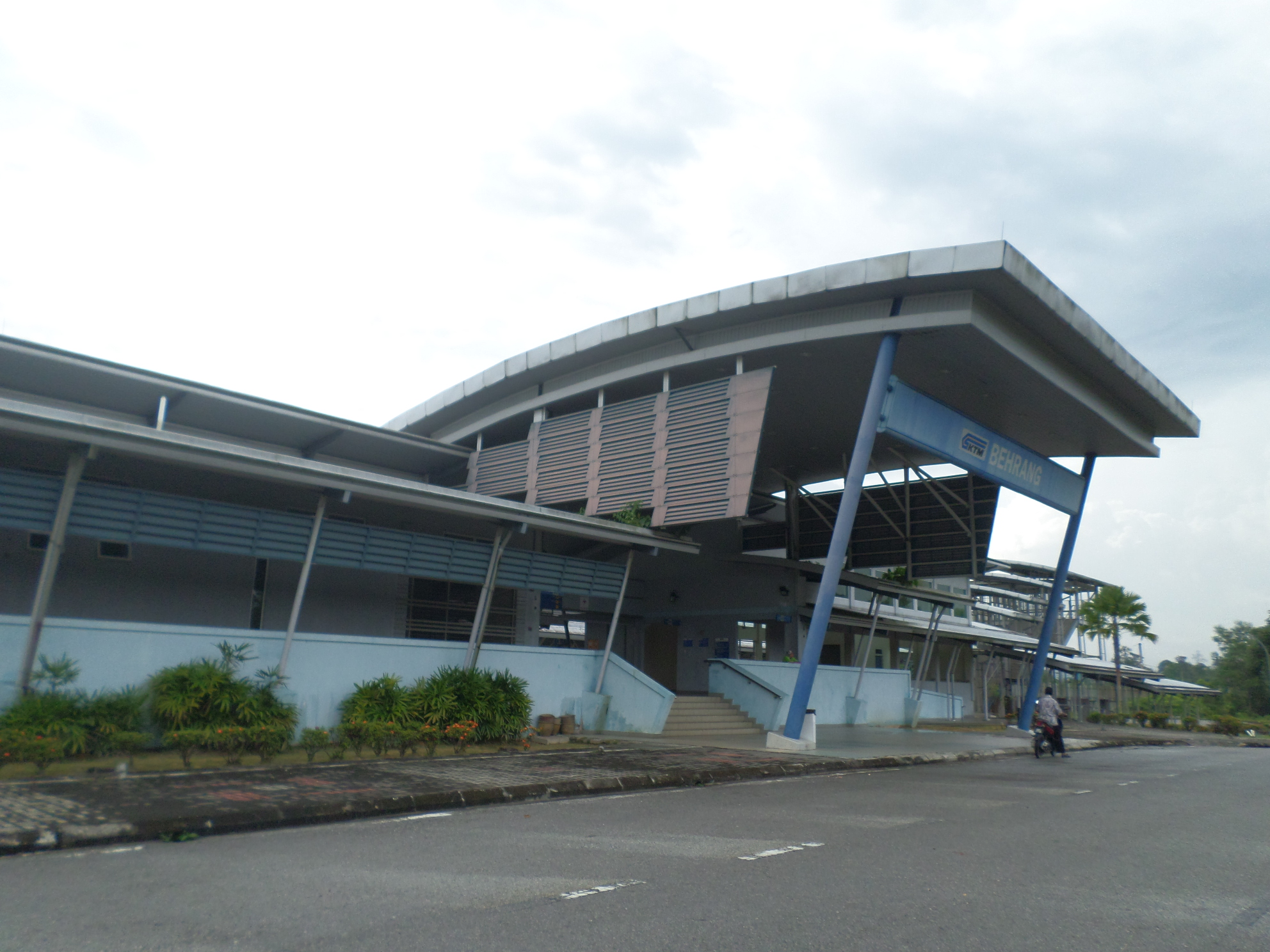
Behrang KTM Railway Station

== Transport ==
Behrang KTM Railway Station, 500m to the Southeast of the town, was rebuilt for the Rawang-Ipoh double tracking project in 2008. However, at present, the station remains unused and closed off from the public as the KTM ETS, which services the line, stops only at neighbouring stations Slim River (Northbound) and Tanjung Malim (Southbound).

== Attractions ==
- Sungai Bil Waterfall, a waterfall located at Behrang Ulu.
