= Slim River =

Town in Perak, Malaysia

- Town
- Town of Slim River; Bandar Slim River
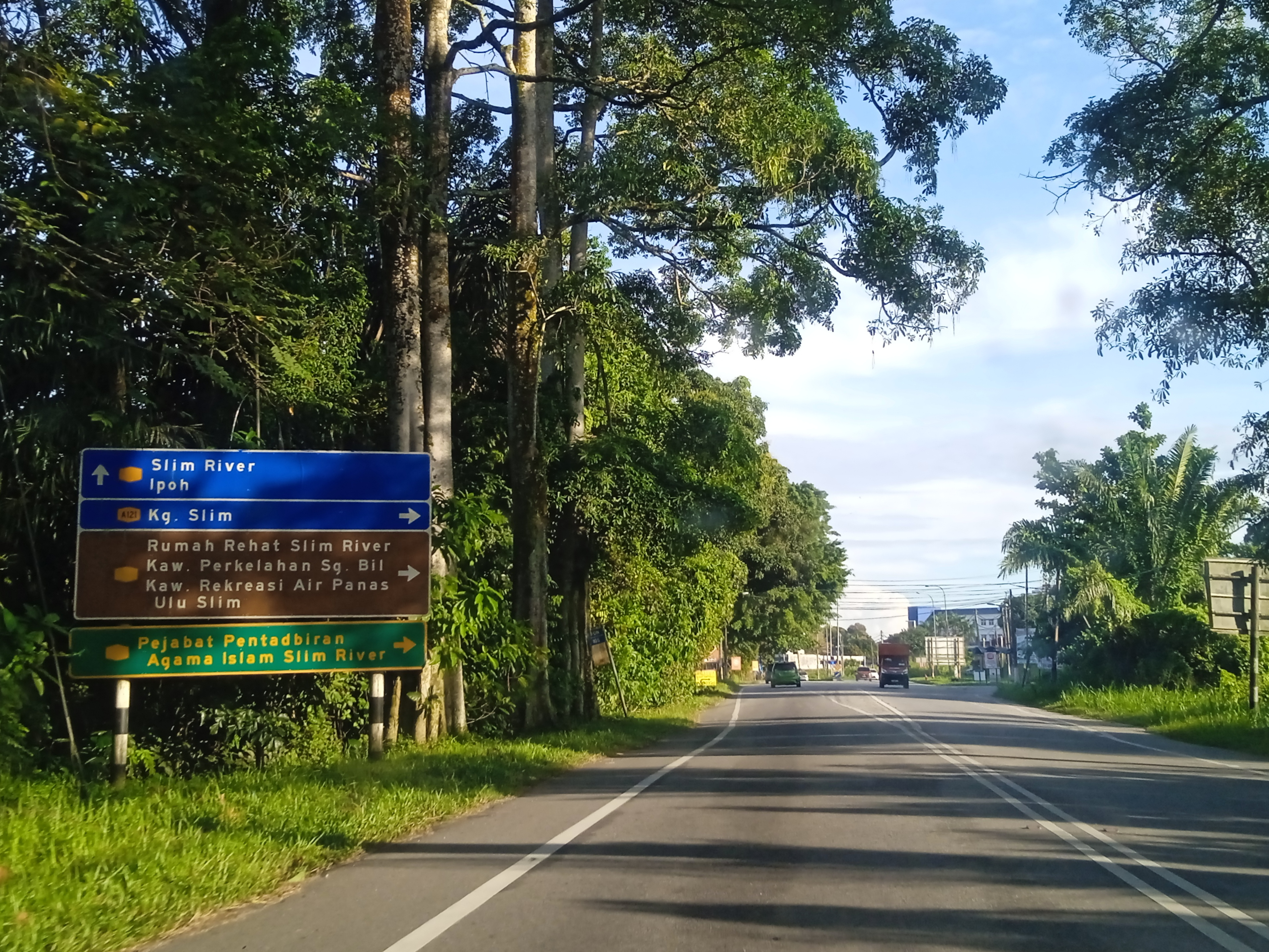
- A section of Federal Route 1 in Slim River, bound for Ipoh
- Location of Slim River in Perak
- Slim River in Perak Slim River (Malaysia) Slim River (Southeast Asia)
- Coordinates: 3°49′51″N 101°24′14″E
- Country: Malaysia
- State: Perak
- District: Muallim

Government
  - Type: District council
  - Body: Tanjung Malim District Council
- Postal code: 35800

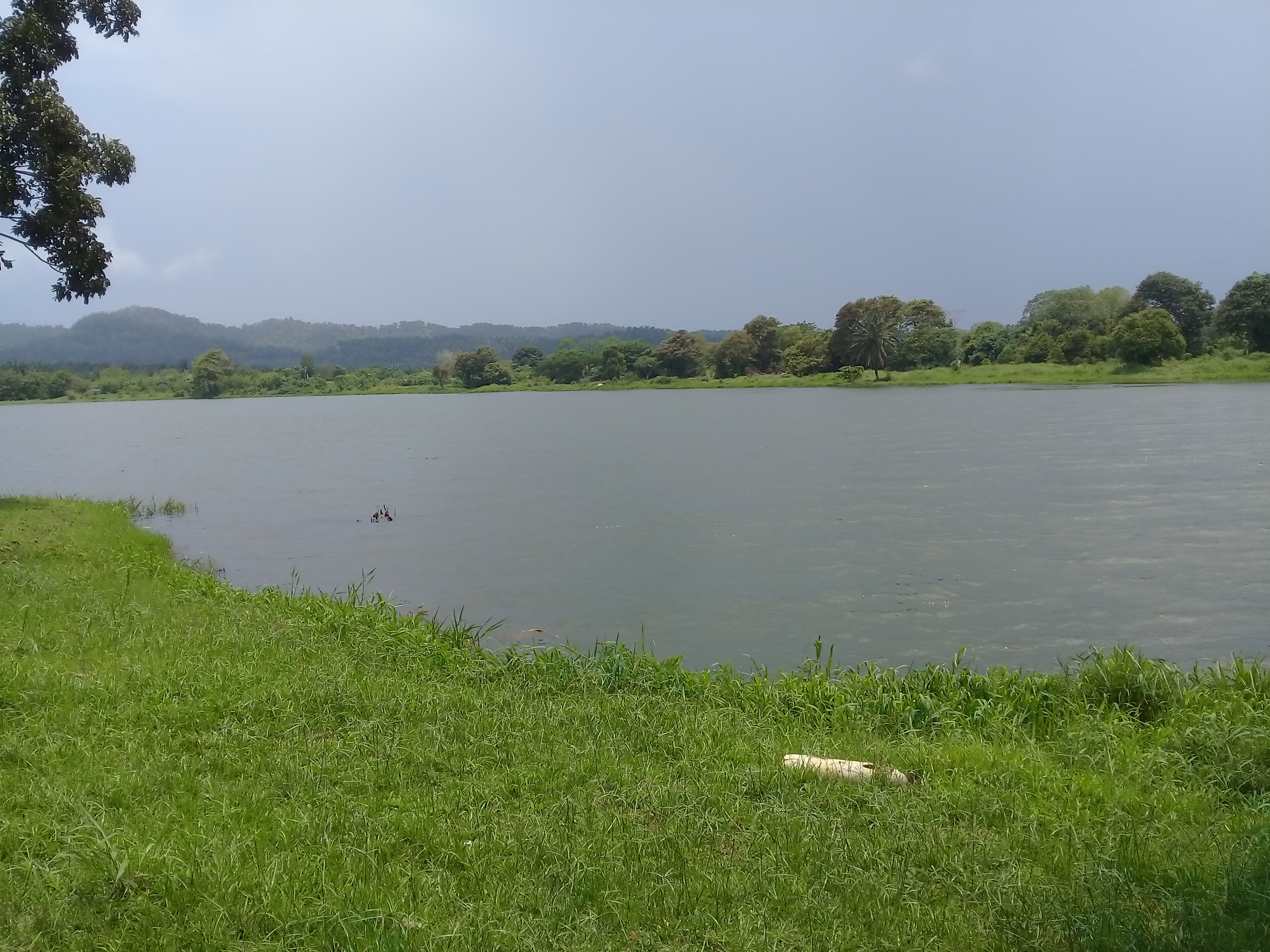
YDP Lake Park.

Slim River is a town in Muallim District, Perak, Malaysia. It is situated in the southern part of Perak and is 20 kilometres (12 mi) of Tanjung Malim, and around 5.5 kilometres (3.4 mi) from the state border with Selangor across the Bernam River. It is positioned equidistant between Kuala Lumpur in the south and Ipoh up north, at approximately 100 kilometres (62 mi) from both cities. The town is surrounded by many small villages.

== History ==
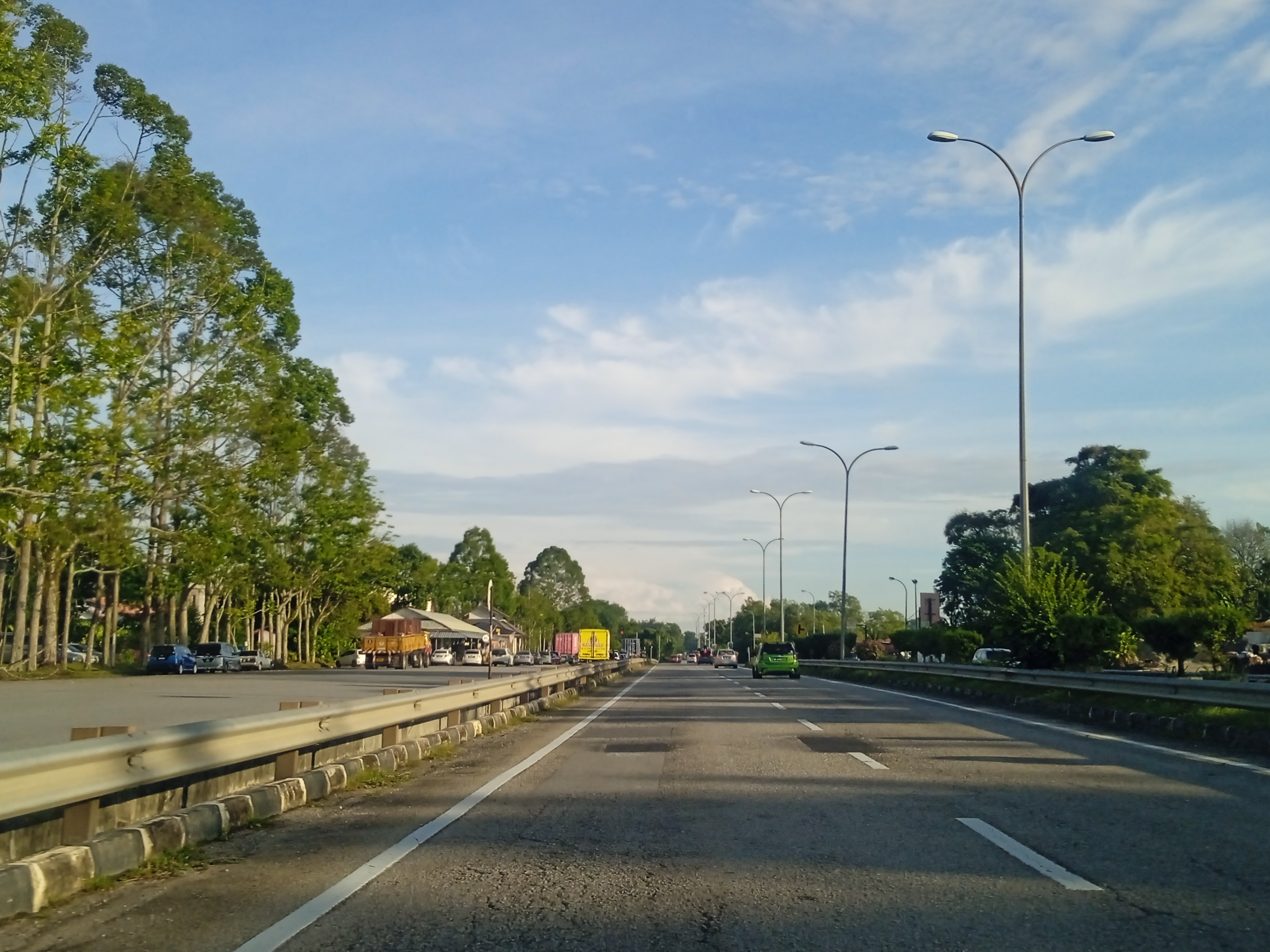
First tolled highlway in Malaysia located at Slim River.

The town is named after a nearby river, Sungai Slim. The word Sungai means river in Malay. The river was named after an English captain, William Slim, in the 19th century. He accidentally went up the river instead of the Perak River which was the main waterway back then.

Slim River was a military strategic midpoint from North to South of Malaya during World War II. It was the site of a major battle during World War II between the Japanese and British forces which consisted of troops from India, Australia and Great Britain. The British lost the Battle of Slim River to the Japanese forces, who were equipped with tanks. The Japanese also had total air superiority. In their defeat at Slim River, the British suffered heavy casualties and many units were cut off from their line of retreat. The battle effectively ended British hopes of defending Malaya.

== Economy ==
The main economic activities are agriculture-based, such as palm oil and rubber plantations. There are some automotive shops selling engine parts and components. This is due to the proximity of the new car manufacturing town, Proton City in Tanjung Malim.

== Demographics ==
The population is estimated at 100,000, and consists of Malays, Chinese, Malaysian Indians (mostly Tamil) and Orang Asli, the indigenous people of Peninsular Malaysia.

== Public amenities ==
There is a new modern government hospital providing basic medical care for the district. In addition, there is a public library for the locals to visit.

=== Schools ===
Primary and secondary education are provided by a few schools in Slim River, namely:

- Sekolah Kebangsaan Balun
- Sekolah Menengah Kebangsaan Dato' Zulkifli Muhammad
- Sekolah Menengah Kebangsaan Slim
- Sekolah Kebangsaan Kuala Slim
- Kolej Vokasional Slim River
- Sekolah Kebangsaan Slim River
- Sekolah Kebangsaan Aminuddin Baki
- Sekolah Rendah Jenis Kebangsaan (C) Chin Hua
- Sekolah Menengah Kebangsaan Agama Slim River
- Sekolah Rendah Jenis Kebangsaan (T) Slim River
- Sekolah Kebangsaan Slim Village
- Sekolah Kebangsaan Ulu Slim
- Sekolah Kebangsaan Pos Bersih
- Sekolah Kebangsaan Pos Tenau
- Sekolah Jenis Kebangsaan (C) Ho Pin, Slim Village
- Sekolah Jenis Kebangsaan (T) Slim Village
- Sekolah Jenis Kebangsaan (T) Ladang Cluny

== Places of interest ==
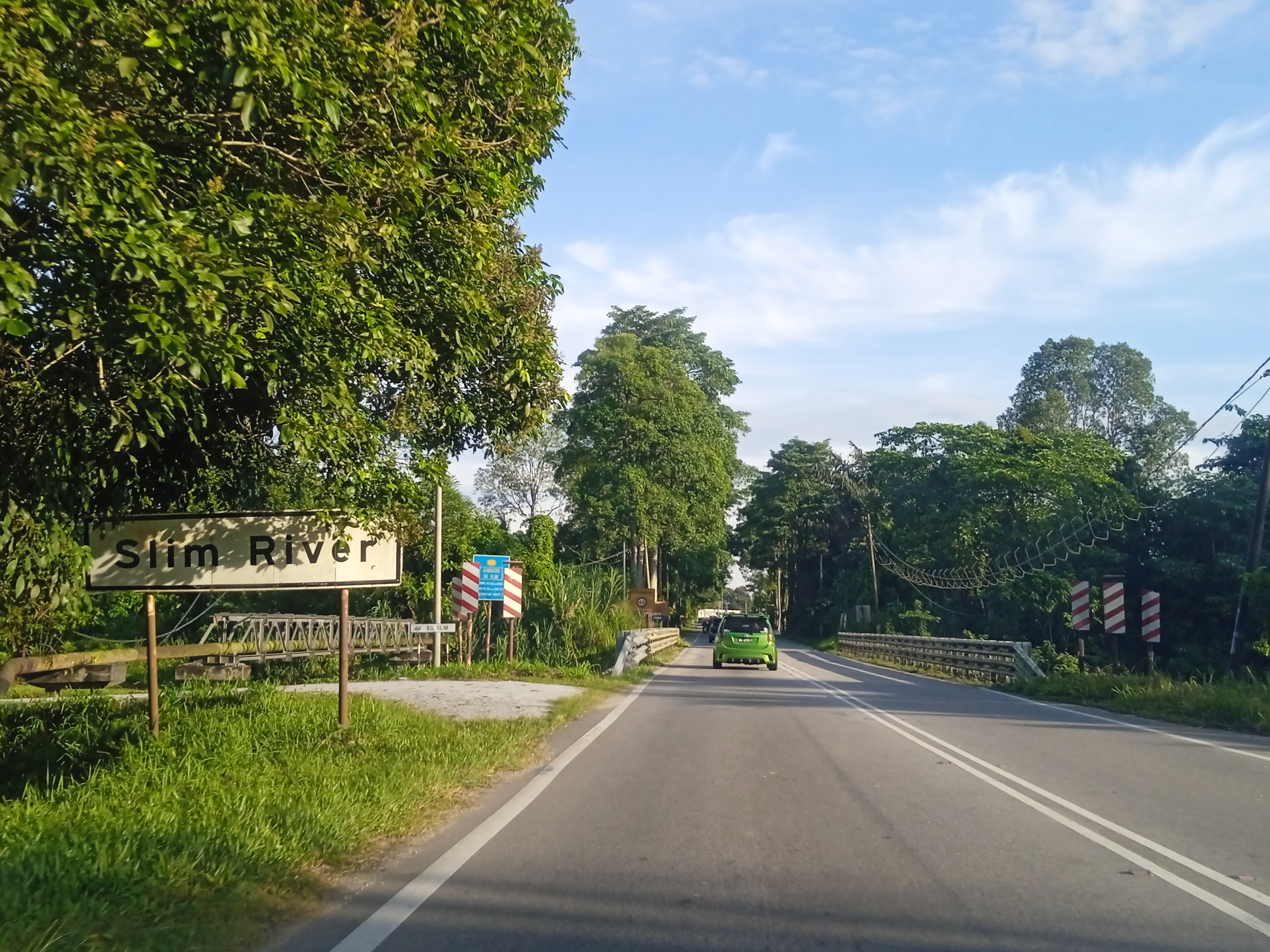
Sungai Slim Bridge along Jalan Tanjung Malim-Slim River.

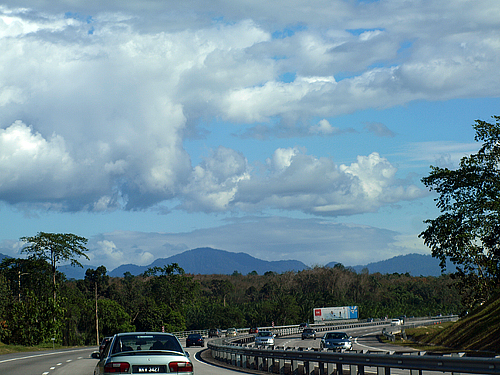
The Titiwangsa Mountains seen from southbound North–South Expressway near Slim River

Situated amidst the forested foothills of the Perakian/Pahangese Titiwangsa, the waterfall at Sungai Bil is famous among the locals for a weekend getaway. Recreation activities and camping is possible, and one can travel from the town by road within 30 minutes. Food stalls selling lunch and fast food are available normally during weekend. For hiking enthusiasts, the trailhead for Mount Liang, a twin-peaked mountain on the border with Pahang, is a stone's throw from Sungai Bil, with its 1,934 metres (6,345 ft) tall eastern summit hosts a mossy forest.

There is also an open wet market every Sunday morning until noon, where one can try a variety of local dishes and delicacies.

At Ulu Slim, about the same distance from Slim River to Sungai Bil, there is a hot spring, and it is expected that the local government will develop the place, into a recreation area, for families. The hot spring water is 104 °C and is reputed to be the 5th hottest hot spring in the world.

Several outdoor extreme sports are available inside Ulu Slim, reservation will be required for these activities such as white water rafting, 4x4 rides, camping, and jungle trekking.

The upcoming Slim River Water Theme Park will also be opened soon.

== Transportation ==
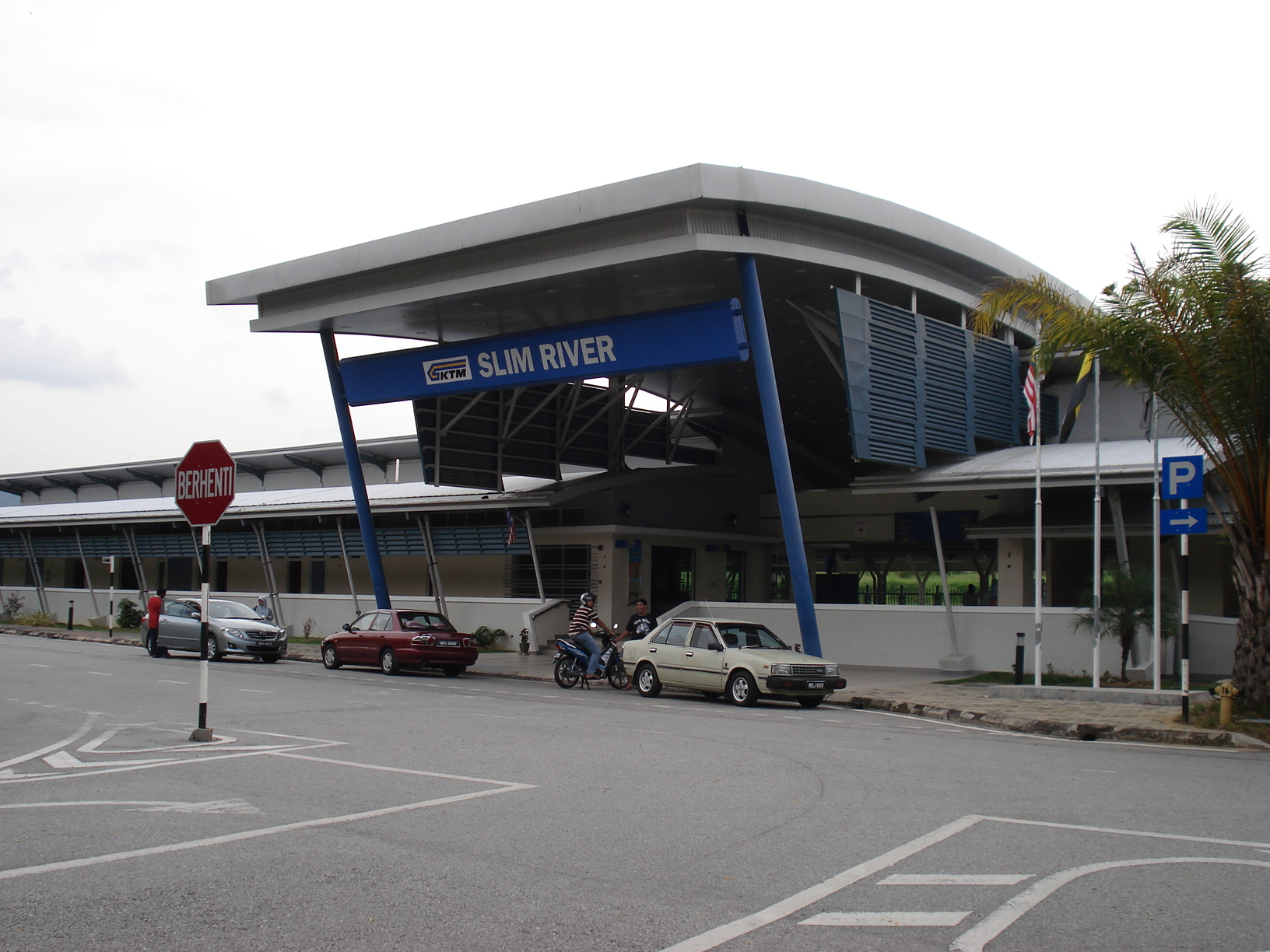
Slim River railway station

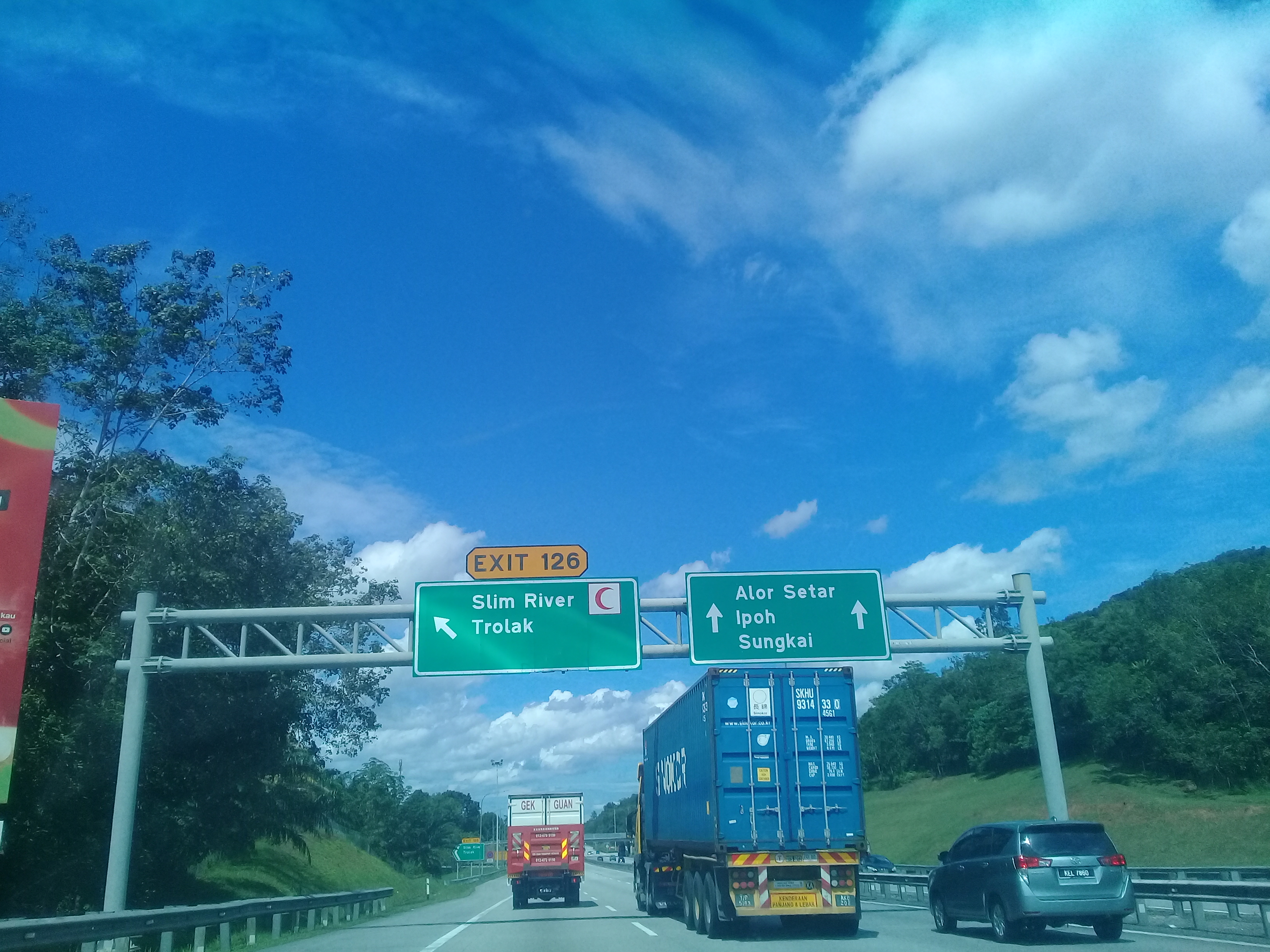
Slim River Interchange

It is accessible by road from the capital city, Kuala Lumpur (100 km) or by train (Slim River railway station). The main trunk road to Tanjung Malim was the first ever toll road in Malaysia and was eventually given free access to the public in the mid 1980s.

Before the construction of North–South Expressway, all traffic going to destinations in the northern states of Peninsular Malaysia, such as Kedah, Perlis and Penang would pass through the town of Slim River. With the new North–South Expressway bypassing smaller towns, fewer people, traffic, and tourists pass through Slim River. Currently, the economy of Slim River is improving due to the nearby Proton City, located in Tanjung Malim.
