= Muallim District =

- Daerah Muallim
- Interactive map of Muallim District
- Coordinates: 3°50′N 101°30′E
- Country: Malaysia
- State: Perak
- Seat: Tanjung Malim
- Local area government(s): Muallim District and Land Office

Government
  - District officer: Mohamad Fitri Hassan

Area
  - Total: 934.35 km^{2} (360.75 sq mi)

Population (2016)
  - Total: 69,639
  - Estimate (2015): 100,200
- Time zone: UTC+8 (MST)
- Postcode: 35700-35900
- Calling code: +6-05
- Vehicle registration: A

The Muallim District is the eleventh district of the state of Perak, Malaysia, situated at the southeastern tip of the state, bordering the state of Selangor. It was proclaimed by the current Sultan of Perak, Sultan Nazrin Muizzuddin Shah on 11 January 2016 at the Tanjung Malim District Council Building. The district was previously part of the neighbouring Batang Padang district.

It covers an area of 93,435-hectares of land.

The district includes the towns of Slim River, Behrang, Tanjung Malim and Proton City. It was given the name Muallim, the Arabic word for "teacher", because of the Sultan Idris Education University in the district. The university has produced many teachers since the colonial era.

== Administrative divisions ==
Muallim District is being administered by the Land and District Office Muallim that located in Slim River, Perak. The current District Officer of Muallim is Encik Mohamad Fitri bin Hassan.

Map of Muallim District

The Muallim District is divided into three mukims (townships), which are:

- Slim (including Slim River and Trolak)
- Ulu Bernam Timur (including Behrang Stesen and Tanjong Malim
- Ulu Bernam Barat

The east and west parts of the Ulu Bernam mukim is separated by the town of Hulu Bernam, which is a part of Hulu Selangor, Selangor. West Ulu Bernam was an exclave of the district and the mukim.

== Demographics ==
Historical population
Year	Pop.	±%
2016	69,639	—
2020	76,688	+10.1%
Figures before 2016 is included under Batang Padang District. Source:

== Federal Parliament and State Assembly Seats ==
The parliamentary constituency of Tanjong Malim encompasses the entire district. It also supplies two state constituencies in the Perak State Legislative Assembly.

List of Muallim district representatives in the Federal Parliament (Dewan Rakyat)

Parliament	Seat Name	Member of Parliament	Party
P77	Tanjong Malim	Chang Lih Kang	Pakatan Harapan (PKR)

List of Muallim district representatives in the State Legislative Assembly of Perak

Parliament	State	Seat Name	State Assemblyman	Party
P77	N58	Slim	Muhammad Zulfadli Zainal	Perikatan Nasional (PAS)
P77	N59	Behrang	Salina Samsudin	Barisan Nasional (UMNO)

== See also ==
- Districts of Malaysia
