= Slim, Perak =

Mukim in Muallim, Perak, Malaysia

Coordinates: 3°51′N 101°29′E

Mukim Slim in Muallim District

Slim (Jawi: سليم) is a mukim in Muallim District, Perak, Malaysia. Variant names are Selim, Slim Village, Kampong Slim, and Slin. (Selim is the standard name preferred by the U.S. Board on Geographic Names).

== Geography ==
Slim spans over an area of 410 km^{2} with a population of 21,900 people.

== Notable attractions ==
- Orang Asli village
- Sungai Bil waterfall

Villages surrounded Slim Village are Kampung Sungai Jurong, Kampung Sungai Gesa, Kg Masjid, Kg Lintah, Kg Sawa, Kg Piong, Kg Penderas, Kg Tamba, Taman Slim Jaya, Taman Slim Jaya 2, Taman Kampung Slim, Rumah Awam, Kampung Baru, Taman Seroja.
