= Proton City =

Township in Perak, Malaysia

Proton City Malay: Bandaraya Proton
- Township
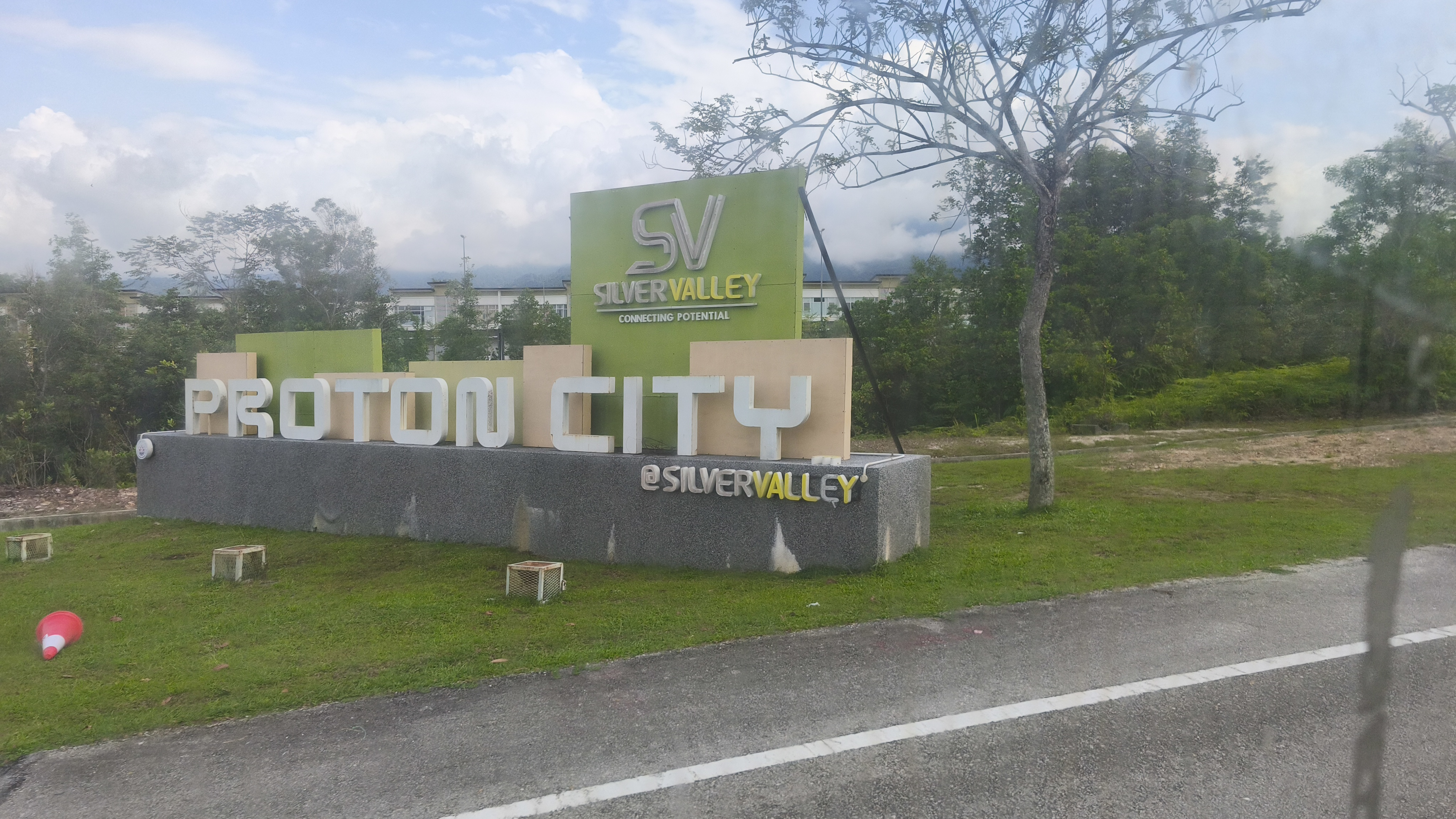
- The landmark entrance to Proton City, a 4,000-acre automotive township in the Muallim District.

- Location within Malaysia
- Coordinates: 3.7407157°N 101.5065777°E
- Country: Malaysia
- State: Perak
- District: Muallim District

Area
  - Total: 16 km^{2} (6.2 sq mi)

Population
  - Total: 240,000
- (projected target)

Proton City (Malay: Bandaraya Proton) is a township with industrial, commercial and residential activities spread over 4,000 acres (16 km^{2}) in Muallim District, Perak, Malaysia. It houses the RM1.8 million Proton car assembly plant.

== Development and industry ==
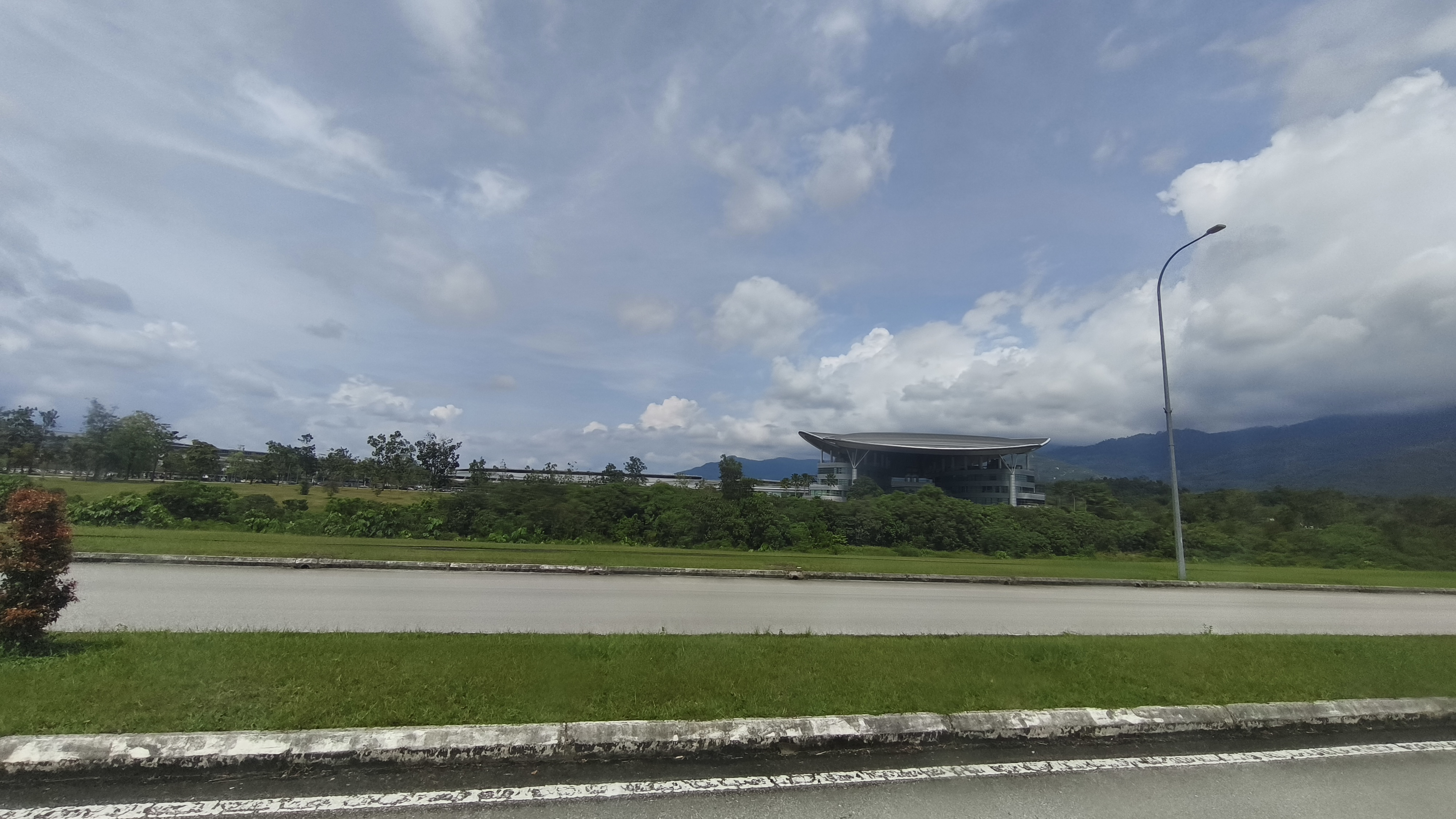
View of the Proton Tanjung Malim manufacturing plant, the primary production facility for Malaysia's national carmaker within Proton City.

Proton City aimed to be fully developed by 2020. Undertaken by Proton City Development Corp, a joint venture between DRB-HICOM and Proton itself. A core member of Proton Holdings, it started in 1996 with an initial investment of RM250,000, beginning with the construction of the Proton plant. The Proton plant has a workforce of more than 2,000 and most of them are expected to live in the area. When Proton City is fully developed, it is projected to have a population of about 240,000.

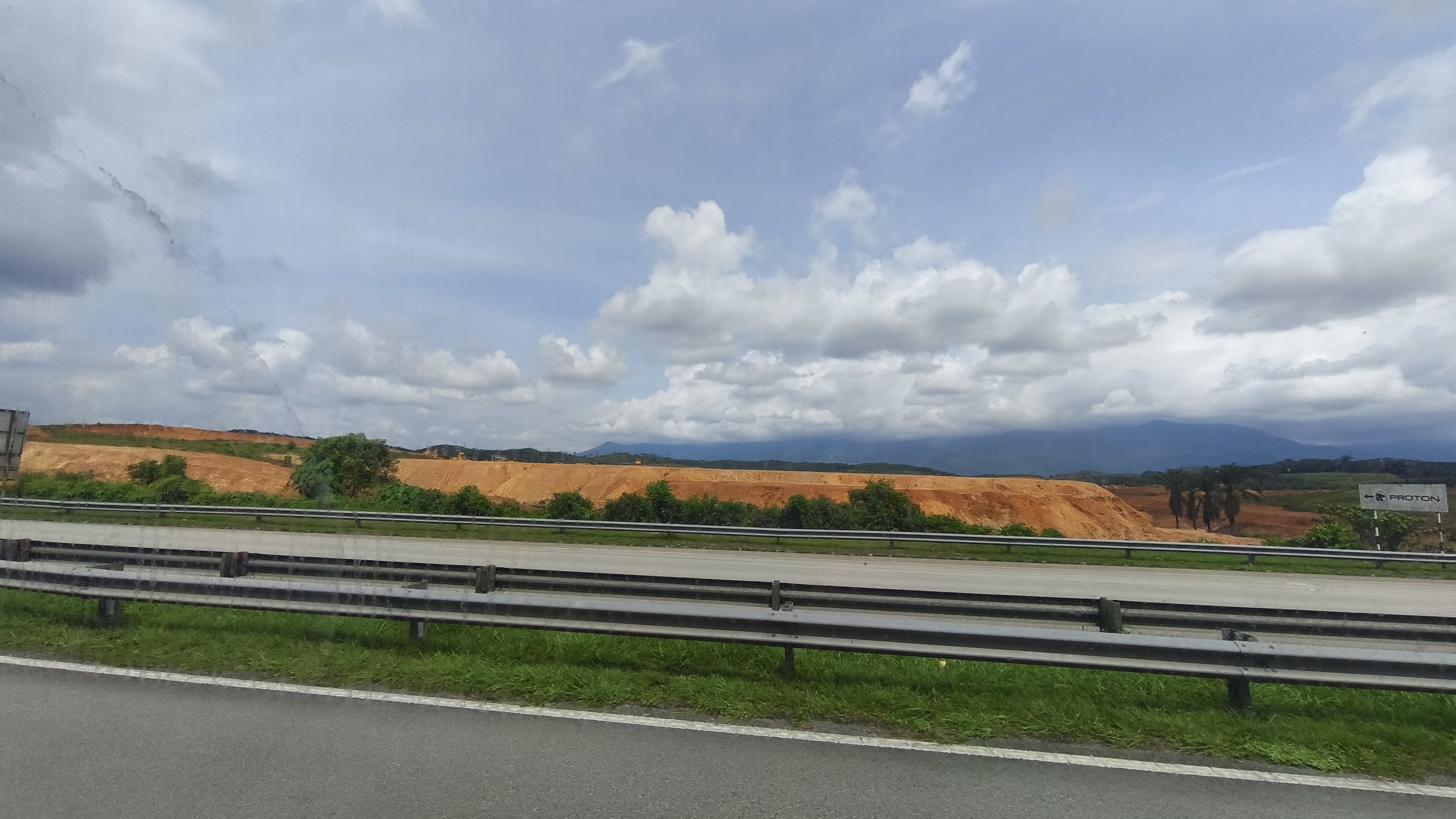
Industrial development at the KLK TechPark in Proton City, which serves as a major manufacturing and high-tech hub.

The industrial landscape in the vicinity of Proton City is witnessing a revival, boosted by the development of the KLK Techpark and an upcoming BYD assembly plant. BYD has chosen the KLK Techpark—a 1,500-acre freehold integrated industrial hub adjacent to Proton City—to establish its first electric vehicle assembly plant in Malaysia. BYD has committed to 150 acres in phase one of the development, with infrastructure work targeted for completion by the end of 2026.

== Residential ==
The first settlement in the area—252 units of apartments—have been handed over to the buyers. These apartments have common facilities that include car and motorcycle parking bays, a children's playground, a BBQ area, car wash areas, a mosque, a nursery/kindergarten on the ground floor of each block, and a multipurpose hall. Parcels 19 and 20, completed in 2007, feature 1,091 apartments, 336 units of single- and double-storey terrace houses, 86 semi-detached houses, 37 bungalows, and 36 shop-offices.

== Education ==
Proton City is also expected to be home to students and staff of the Sultan Idris Education University (UPSI), which was previously known as Sultan Idris Teachers' College. UPSI, occupying 800 acres (3.2 km^{2}) within Proton City, is expected to have a student population of 20,000 within four years.

== See also ==
- Future City
