= Selangor State Route B74 =

Road in Malaysia

Selangor Route 74
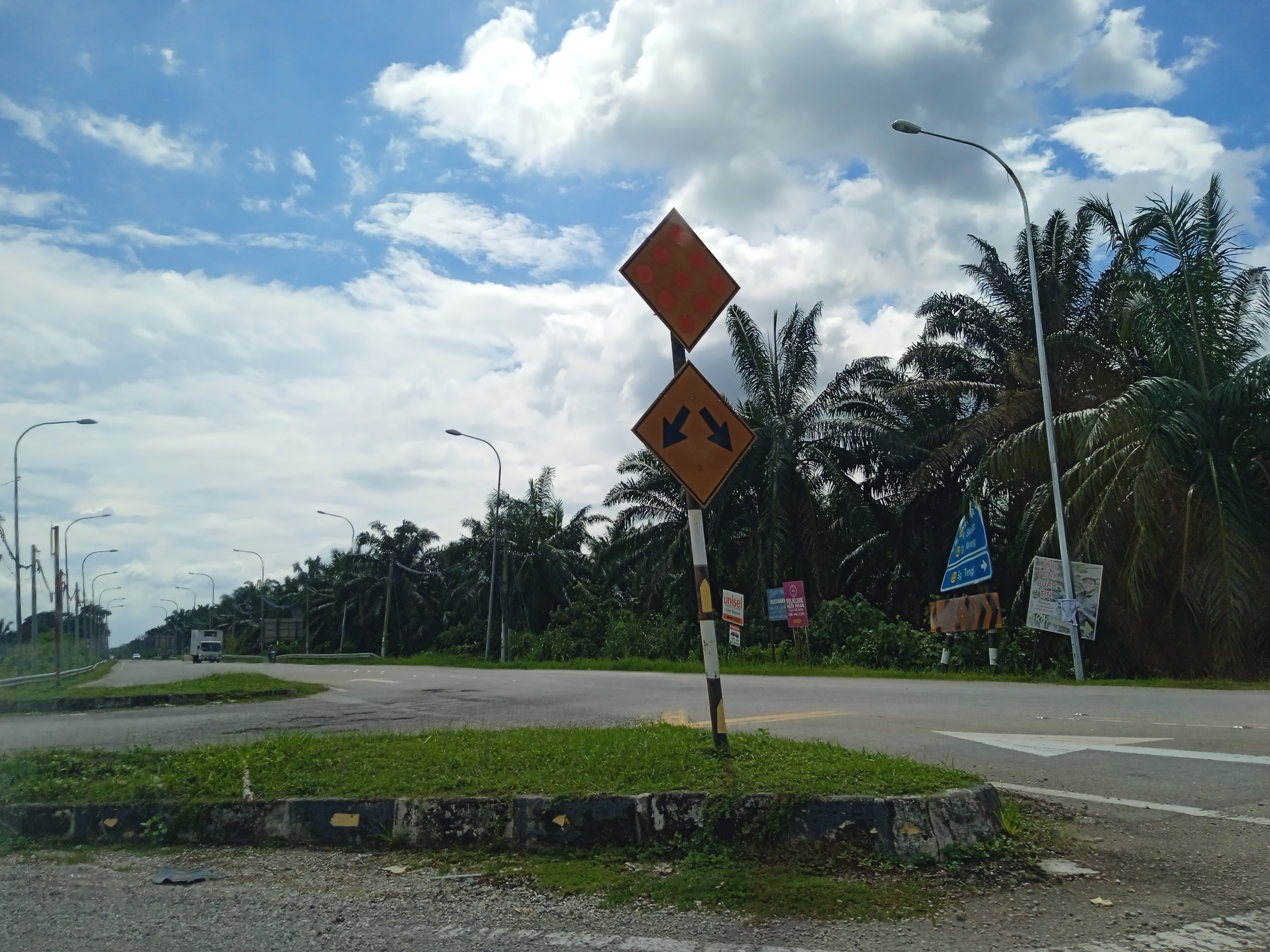

Major junctions
- North end: FELDA Soeharto
- B42 State Route B42; FT 228 Bukit Tagar Highway; B44 State Route B44
- South end: Kampung Berjuntai Bestari

Location
- Country: Malaysia
- Primary destinations: Sabak Bernam, Kampung Gedangsa, Sungai Tengi, Bukit Tagar, Bestari Jaya (Batang Berjuntai)

Highway system
- Highways in Malaysia; Expressways; Federal; State

Selangor State Route B74, Jalan Sungai Tengi or Jalan Timur Tambahan is a major road in Selangor, Malaysia. The road connects Kampung Berjuntai Bestari near Bestari Jaya (formerly Batang Berjuntai) in the south to FELDA Soeharto in the north. It is the second longest state road in Selangor after Selangor State Route B44.

== Junction lists ==
The entire route is located in Selangor.

Legend:

- I/C - Interchange, I/S - Intersection, RSA - Rest and service area, OBR - Overhead bridge restaurant, R/R - Restaurant and rest plaza, L/B - Layby, V/P - Vista point, TN - tunnel, T/P - Toll plaza, BR - Bridge
- C - Cloverleaf, S - Stack, T-A - Trumpet-A, T-B - Trumpet-B, DT - Directional-T/Y, SDT - Semi-Directional-T/Y, P-Y - Partial-Y, D - Diamond, P-C - Partial cloverleaf, D-D - Diverging diamond, D-R - Direct ramp

District	Location	km	mi	Name	Destinations	Notes
Kuala Selangor	Bestari Jaya			Kampung Berjuntai Bestari	B42 Selangor State Route B42 – Tanjung Karang, Kuala Selangor, Sabak Bernam, Bestari Jaya (Batang Berjuntai), Ijok, Sungai Buloh, Kuala Lumpur	T-junctions
Kuala Selangor	Bestari Jaya			UNISEL	University of Selangor (UNISEL)	T-junctions
Hulu Selangor	Bukit Tagar			Bukit Tagar Estate		
Hulu Selangor	Bukit Tagar			Bukit Tagar Highway	FT 228 Bukit Tagar Highway – Bukit Tagar, Bukit Tagar Incinerator; North–South Expressway Northern Route / AH2 – Bukit Kayu Hitam, Ipoh, Kuala Lumpur, Klang	T-junctions
Hulu Selangor	Bukit Tagar			Bukit Tagar Estate		
Hulu Selangor	Bukit Tagar			PKPS Farm	V	
Hulu Selangor	Sungai Tengi			Sungai Tengi		
Hulu Selangor	Sungai Tengi			FELDA Soeharto		
Hulu Selangor	Sungai Tengi			Jalan Sabak Bernam–Hulu Selangor	B44 Selangor State Route B44 – Sabak Bernam, Teluk Intan, FELDA Gedangsa, Behrang, Tanjung Malim, Kuala Kubu Bharu	T-junctions
1.000 mi = 1.609 km; 1.000 km = 0.621 mi
