= Malaysia Federal Route 228 =

Road in Malaysia

Federal Route 228
- Bukit Tagar Highway
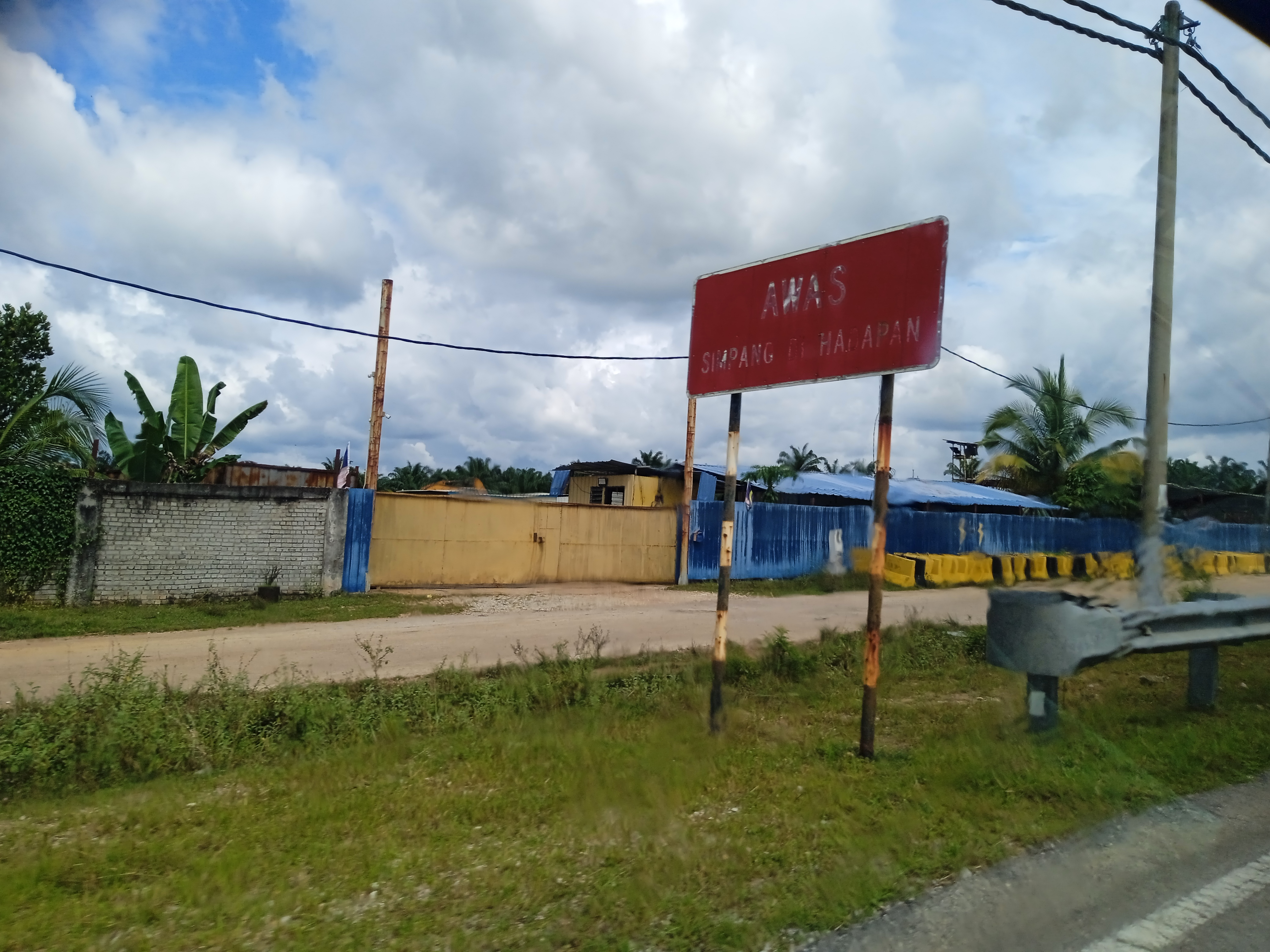
- Kampung Sepakat along Bukit Tagar Highway

Route information
- Maintained by Malaysian Public Works Department
- Length: 7.90 km (4.91 mi)
- Existed: 2004–present
- History: Completed in 2006

Major junctions
- West end: Jalan Sungai Tengi
- B74 State Route B74; North–South Expressway Northern Route / AH2
- East end: Bukit Tagar Interchange

Location
- Country: Malaysia
- Primary destinations: Sungai Tengi, Bestari Jaya (Batang Berjuntai), Bukit Tagar, Bukit Tagar Landfill, Berjaya City, Ipoh, Kuala Lumpur

Highway system
- Highways in Malaysia; Expressways; Federal; State

Bukit Tagar Highway, Federal Route 228, is a major highway in Selangor, Malaysia. It is also a main route to North–South Expressway Northern Route via Bukit Tagar Interchange. The Kilometre Zero of the Federal Route 228 starts at Jalan Sungai Tengi (State Route B74) junctions.

== Features ==
At most sections, the Federal Route 228 was built under the JKR R5 road standard, allowing maximum speed limit of up to 90 km/h (56 mph).

== Junction list ==
The entire route is located in Bukit Tagar, Hulu Selangor District, Selangor.

Location	km	mi	Exit	Name	Destinations	Notes
Bukit Tagar	0.0	0.0	22801	Jalan Sungai Tengi	B74 Selangor State Route B74 – Sungai Tengi, FELDA Soeharto, Bestari Jaya (Batang Berjuntai), University of Selangor (UNISEL)	
Bukit Tagar			22802		Unnamed road – Bukit Tagar Incinerator and Landfill	
Bukit Tagar			22803		Jalan BC Utama – Berjaya City Industrial Park	
Bukit Tagar			Buloh River bridge			
Bukit Tagar			Bukit Tagar Toll Plaza Layby			
Bukit Tagar			Bukit Tagar Toll Plaza			
Bukit Tagar	7.90	4.91	119	Bukit Tagar-NSE	North–South Expressway Northern Route / AH2 – Alor Setar, Ipoh, Lembah Beringin, Bukit Beruntung, Rawang, Kuala Lumpur	Trumpet interchange
1.000 mi = 1.609 km; 1.000 km = 0.621 mi: Electronic toll collection
