= Selangor State Route B44 =

Road in Malaysia

Selangor Route 44
- Jalan Sabak Bernam–Hulu Selangor (Jalan Sungai Panjang)
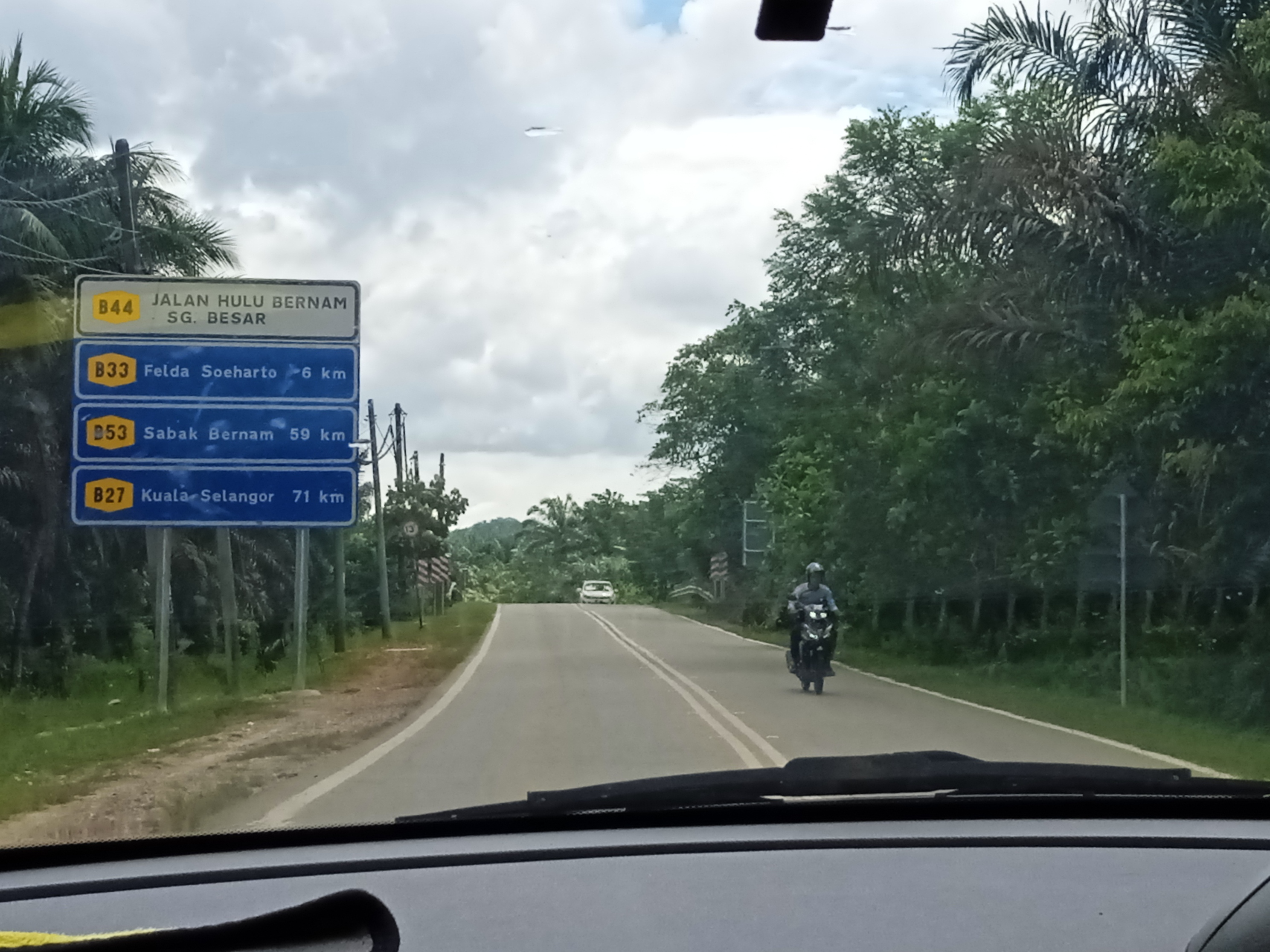

Route information
- Length: 77.6 km (48.2 mi)

Major junctions
- West end: Sungai Besar, Sabak Bernam
- FT 5 Federal Route 5 B74 State Route B74; FT 1207 Federal Route 1207; A124 Jalan Behrang; FT 1 Tanjung Malim–Slim River Highway; North–South Expressway Northern Route / AH2
- East end: Ulu Bernam, Hulu Selangor

Location
- Country: Malaysia
- Primary destinations: Sabak, FELDA Soeharto, FELDA Gedangsa, Behrang, Tanjung Malim, Kuala Kubu Bharu

Highway system
- Highways in Malaysia; Expressways; Federal; State

Selangor State Route B44 on Sabak Bernam side is a major road in Selangor, Malaysia. It is the longest state road in Selangor with a total distance of 77.6 km (48.2 mi) The roads connects Sungai Besar at Sabak Bernam in the west to Ulu Bernam at Hulu Selangor in the east.

== History ==
On 10 May 2026, the landslide in Ulu Bernam leaded to the collapse of two trees and the B44 road blocked.

== Route description ==
The Kilometre Zero of Jalan Sabak Bernam–Hulu Selangor starts at Sungai Besar, Sabak Bernam, at its interchange with the Federal Route 5, the main trunk road of the west coast of Peninsular Malaysia.

There are scenic views of paddy fields between Sungai Besar and Sungai Panjang in Sabak Bernam.

At most sections, the Selangor State Route B44 was built under the JKR R5 road standard, allowing maximum speed limit of up to 90 km/h (56 mph).

There are no alternate routes or sections with motorcycle lanes.

== Junction lists ==
The entire route is located in Selangor.

Legend:

- I/C - Interchange, I/S - Intersection, RSA - Rest and service area, OBR - Overhead bridge restaurant, R/R - Restaurant and rest plaza, L/B - Layby, V/P - Vista point, TN - tunnel, T/P - Toll plaza, BR - Bridge
- C - Cloverleaf, S - Stack, T-A - Trumpet-A, T-B - Trumpet-B, DT - Directional-T/Y, SDT - Semi-Directional-T/Y, P-Y - Partial-Y, D - Diamond, P-C - Partial cloverleaf, D-D - Diverging diamond, D-R - Direct ramp

District	Km	Exit	Name	Destinations	Notes
Sabak Bernam	0.0	I/S	Sungai Besar	FT 5 Malaysia Federal Route 5 – Ipoh, Teluk Intan, Sabak, Sungai Besar, Sekinchan, Tanjung Karang, Kuala Selangor, Klang	Half-diamond interchange
Sabak Bernam		BR	Sungai Limau bridge		
Sabak Bernam			Kampung Parit Empat		
Sabak Bernam			Parit 7 Timur		
Sabak Bernam			Kampung Parit Sepuloh		
Sabak Bernam			Parit 11		
Sabak Bernam			Parit 12		
Sabak Bernam			Bagan Terap	B53 Jalan Parit 13 – Kampung Parit Enam, Kampung Kemboja, Sabak	T-junctions
Sabak Bernam		L/B	BH Petrol L/B	BH Petrol L/B – BHP Petrol	
Sabak Bernam		BR	Sungai Panjang bridge		
Sabak Bernam			Sungai Panjang		
Sabak Bernam			Kampung Binjai Patah		
Sabak Bernam			Kampung Merbau Jaya		
Sabak Bernam			Parit 36		
Sabak Bernam			Binjai Jaya		
Sabak Bernam			Kampung Merbau Berdarah		
Sabak Bernam			Kampung Padang		
Sabak Bernam			Kampung Tebing		
Sabak Bernam			Kampung Hala Cara Baru		
Sabak Bernam–Hulu Selangor district border		BR	Terusan Besar bridge		
Hulu Selangor			Jalan Sungai Tengi	B74 Selangor State Route B74 – FELDA Soeharto, Sungai Tengi, Bukit Tagar, Bestari Jaya (Batang Berjuntai), Rawang, University of Selangor (UNISEL); North–South Expressway Northern Route / AH2 – Rawang, Kuala Lumpur, Klang	T-junctions
Hulu Selangor			Seri Keledang	Jalan Seri Keledang – Seri Keledang, Bernam River Airfield	T-junctions
Hulu Selangor			FELDA Gedangsa	FT 1207 Malaysia Federal Route 1207 – FELDA Gedangsa	T-junctions
Hulu Selangor			Kampung Seberang		
Hulu Selangor			Sungai Gesir Bridge		
Hulu Selangor			Kampung Gesir Tengah	Jalan Gesir – Kampung Gesir Ulu, Kampung Lalang	T-junctions
Hulu Selangor			Kampung Selisek		
Hulu Selangor			Kampung Sekolah	A124 Jalan Behrang – Behrang; North–South Expressway Northern Route / AH2 – Bukit Kayu Hitam, Penang, Ipoh	T-junctions
Hulu Selangor			Kampung Teluk Raja		
Hulu Selangor			Kampung Serigala Ulu		
Hulu Selangor			Changkat Asa Estate		
Hulu Selangor			Kampung Sungai Merapoh		
Hulu Selangor	77.6		Ulu Bernam	Jalan Bandar Tanjung Malim – Tanjung Malim town centre, Tanjung Malim railway station KTM ETS	T-junctions
Hulu Selangor			Tanjung Malim-NSE I/C	FT 1 Tanjung Malim–Slim River Highway – Slim River, Behrang, Tanjung Malim, Kalumpang, Kerling, Kuala Kubu Bharu, Fraser's Hill; North–South Expressway Northern Route / AH2 – Alor Setar, Ipoh, Behrang, Rawang, Klang, Kuala Lumpur	T-junctions
