= Selangor State Route B42 =

Road in Malaysia

Selangor Route 42
- Jalan Tanjung Karang–Bestari Jaya

Major junctions
- West end: Tanjong Karang
- FT 5 Federal Route 5 B178 State Route B178; B37 State Route B37; B74 State Route B74; B27 State Route B27
- South end: Bestari Jaya (Batang Berjuntai)

Location
- Country: Malaysia
- Primary destinations: Ujong Permatang, Kampung Hang Tuah, Kampung Berjuntai Bestari

Highway system
- Highways in Malaysia; Expressways; Federal; State

Selangor State Route B42, Jalan Tanjung Karang–Bestari Jaya or Jalan Raja Musa is a major road in Selangor, Malaysia. The road connects Tanjong Karang in the west until Bestari Jaya (formerly Batang Berjuntai) in the south. It is the third longest road in Selangor state.

== Junction lists ==
The entire route is located in Kuala Selangor District, Selangor.

Legend:

- I/C - Interchange, I/S - Intersection, RSA - Rest and service area, OBR - Overhead bridge restaurant, R/R - Restaurant and rest plaza, L/B - Layby, V/P - Vista point, TN - tunnel, T/P - Toll plaza, BR - Bridge
- C - Cloverleaf, S - Stack, T-A - Trumpet-A, T-B - Trumpet-B, DT - Directional-T/Y, SDT - Semi-Directional-T/Y, P-Y - Partial-Y, D - Diamond, P-C - Partial cloverleaf, D-D - Diverging diamond, D-R - Direct ramp

Location	km	mi	Name	Destinations	Notes
Tanjong Karang			Tanjong Karang	FT 5 Malaysia Federal Route 5 – Teluk Intan, Sabak Bernam, Sekinchan, Kuala Selangor, Klang	T-junctions
Tanjong Karang			Kampung Parit Serong		
Tanjong Karang			Kampung Baru Tiram Buruk		
Tanjong Karang			Kampung Tiram Setia		
Tanjong Karang			Kampung Tiram Setia Jaya		
Tanjong Karang			Kampung Baharu Ulu Tiram Buruk	B178 Jalan Kunci Air 2 – Kuala Selangor	T-junctions
Ujong Permatang			Ujong Permatang	B37 Selangor State Route B37 – Bukit Belimbing, Kuala Selangor	T-junctions
Taman Raja Musa			Taman Raja Musa		
Taman Raja Musa			Kampung Raja Musa		
Bestari Jaya			Kampung Baharu Pasangan		
Bestari Jaya			Kampung Sri Makmur		
Bestari Jaya			Ladang Tennamaran		
Bestari Jaya			Kampung Berjuntai Bestari	B74 Selangor State Route B74 – Sungai Tengi, FELDA Soeharto, Bukit Tagar, University of Selangor (UNISEL)	T-junctions
Bestari Jaya			Kampung Hang Tuah		
Bestari Jaya			Selangor River bridge		
Bestari Jaya			Bestari Jaya (Batang Berjuntai)	B27 Selangor State Route B27 – Kuala Selangor, Kampung Kuantan, Kampung Kuantan fireflies, Batu Arang, Rawang; North–South Expressway Northern Route / AH2 – Bukit Kayu Hitam, Ipoh, Kuala Lumpur	T-junctions
1.000 mi = 1.609 km; 1.000 km = 0.621 mi
