= Malaysia Federal Route 1207 =

Road in Malaysia

Federal Route 1207
- Jalan FELDA Gedangsa

Route information
- Maintained by Malaysian Public Works Department
- Length: 4.7 km (2.9 mi)

Major junctions
- South end: B44 Jalan Sabak Bernam-Hulu Selangor
- B44 Jalan Sabak Bernam-Hulu Selangor
- North end: FELDA Gedangsa

Location
- Country: Malaysia

Highway system
- Highways in Malaysia; Expressways; Federal; State

Federal Route 1207, or Jalan FELDA Gedangsa, is a Federal Land Development Authority (FELDA) federal road in Selangor, Malaysia.

The Kilometre Zero is located at Jalan Sabak Bernam-Hulu Selangor.

At most sections, the Federal Route 1207 was built under the JKR R5 road standard, with a speed limit of 90 km/h.

== List of junctions ==
Km	Exit	Junctions	To	Remarks
FT 1207 (1207); 0		Jalan Sabak Bernam-Hulu Selangor	B44 Jalan Sabak Bernam-Hulu Selangor West; Sabak Bernam; FELDA Soeharto; Sungai Tengi East; Behrang Stesyen; Tanjung Malim; Kuala Kubu Bharu	T-junctions
FELDA Gedangsa; FELDA Gedangsa border arch
		FELDA Gedangsa		
		FELDA Gedangsa	Masjid Al Makmur Gedangsa; Sekolah Rendah Agama Gedangsa	
