= Selangor State Route B37 =

Road in Malaysia

Selangor Route 37
- Jalan Bukit Belimbing

Major junctions
- North end: Ujong Permatang
- B42 State Route B42; B180 State Route B180; B178 State Route B178; FT 5 Federal Route 5
- South end: Kampung Permatang

Location
- Country: Malaysia
- Primary destinations: Bukit Belimbing

Highway system
- Highways in Malaysia; Expressways; Federal; State

Selangor State Route B37, Jalan Bukit Belimbing is a major road in Selangor, Malaysia.

== Junction lists ==
The entire route is located in Kuala Selangor District, Selangor.

Legend:

- I/C - Interchange, I/S - Intersection, RSA - Rest and service area, OBR - Overhead bridge restaurant, R/R - Restaurant and rest plaza, L/B - Layby, V/P - Vista point, TN - tunnel, T/P - Toll plaza, BR - Bridge
- C - Cloverleaf, S - Stack, T-A - Trumpet-A, T-B - Trumpet-B, DT - Directional-T/Y, SDT - Semi-Directional-T/Y, P-Y - Partial-Y, D - Diamond, P-C - Partial cloverleaf, D-D - Diverging diamond, D-R - Direct ramp

Location	km	mi	Destinations	Notes
Ujong Permatang			B42 Selangor State Route B42 – Sabak Bernam, Sekinchan, Tanjung Karang, Bestari Jaya (Batang Berjuntai), Sungai Tengi	T-junctions
Bukit Belimbing			B180 Jalan Haji Muhamad 1 – Taman Bukit Belimbing, Kampung Bukit Belimbing	Junctions
Taman Seri Mengkuang			B178 Jalan Kunci Air 1	T-junctions
Kampung Permatang			FT 5 Malaysia Federal Route 5 – Teluk Intan, Sabak Bernam, Tanjung Karang, Kuala Selangor, Klang	T-junctions
1.000 mi = 1.609 km; 1.000 km = 0.621 mi
