= Bukit Tagar =

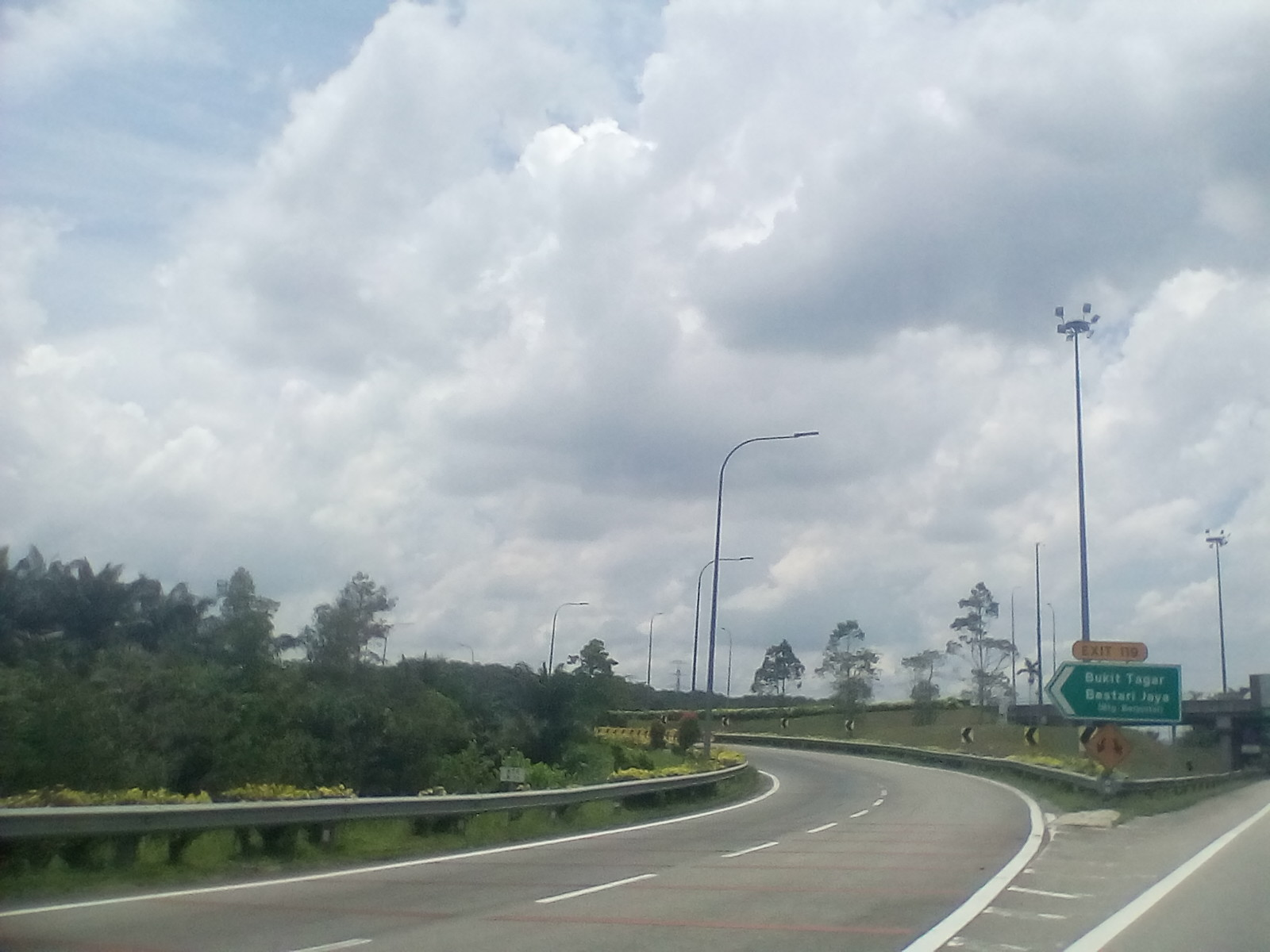
- Bukit Tagar Interchange
- Interactive map of Bukit Tagar
- Coordinates: 3°30′5.51″N 101°28′9.75″E
- Country: Malaysia
- State: Selangor
- District: Hulu Selangor
- Mukim: Sungai Tinggi

Bukit Tagar is an area in Hulu Selangor District, Selangor, Malaysia. The Bukit Tagar Landfill is located here.

The upcoming Berjaya Industrial City (built by the Berjaya Group, the same company that constructed the landfill) is situated along the main road branching off from the PLUS Highway Exit 119. The main road terminates into a T-junction that joins with the State Route B74 Jalan Sungai Tengi. The left turn leads to Bestari Jaya, with the UNISEL campus situated less than 10 kilometers away, and continues towards Kuala Selangor. The right turn leads to FELDA Sungai Tengi, and continues towards other FELDA settlements such as FELDA Soeharto and FELDA Gedangsa, before reaching Behrang.

Apart from these nearby population centers, Bukit Tagar does not have any other housing areas and villages within the vicinity of the landfill and Industrial City.

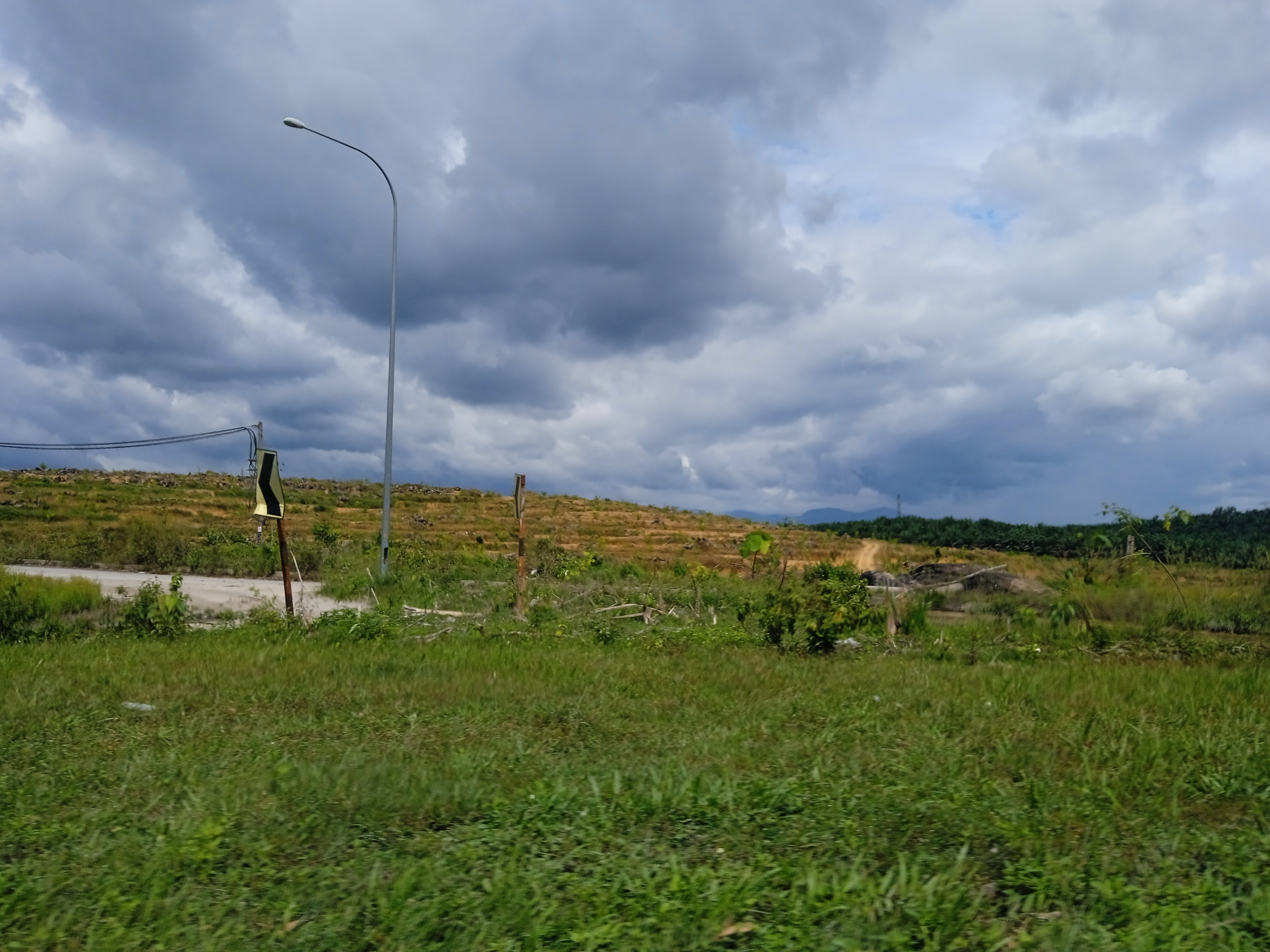
Bukit Tagar

== History ==
In January 2026, the Selangor state government proposed a centralised closed pork farm industry in Bukit Tagar, as an part of environment governance. However, this proposal is not running.
