= Sungai Tengi =

Town in Selangor, Malaysia

Coordinates: 3.6523633°N 101.3970768°E

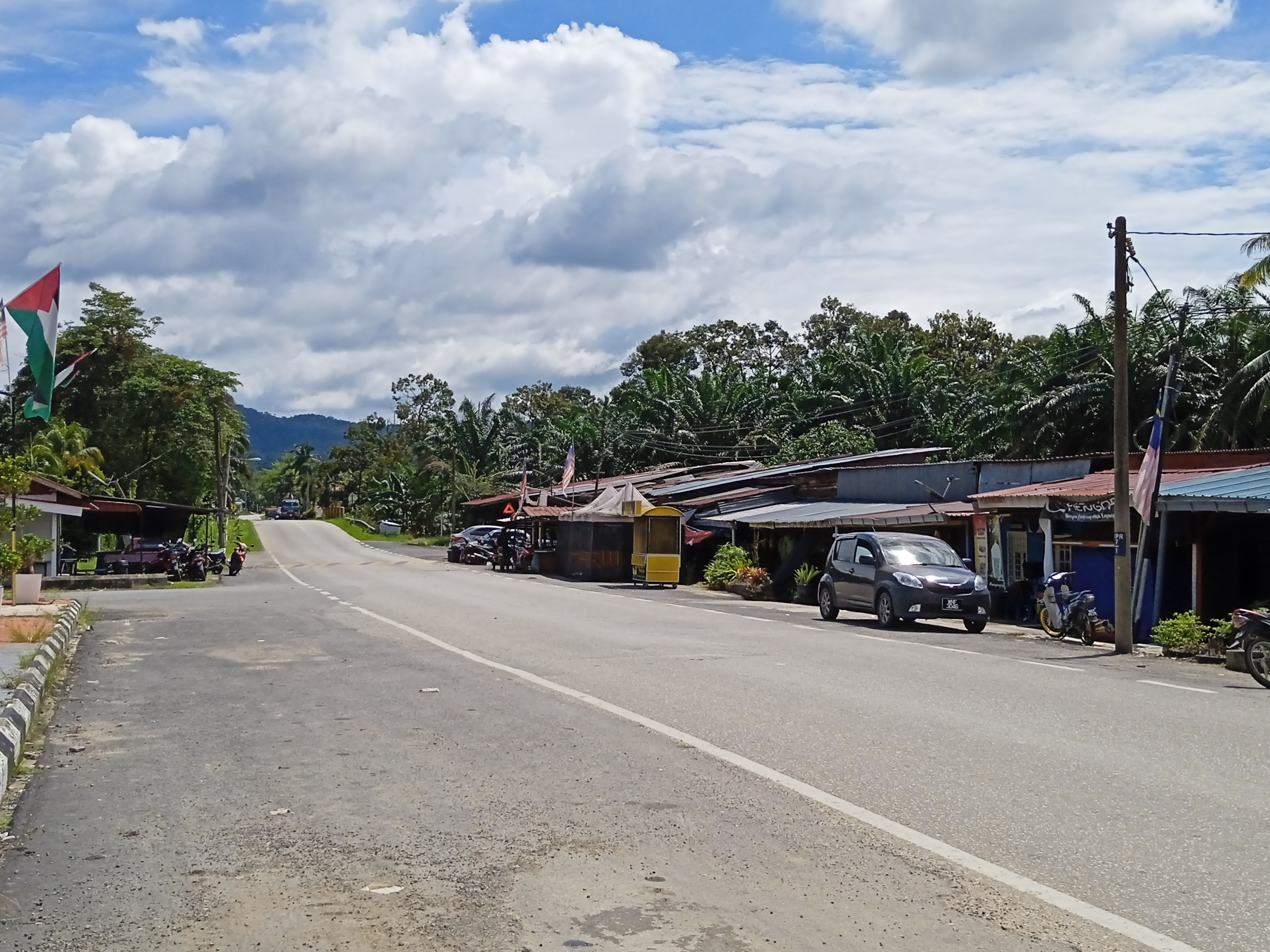
Sungai Tengi

Sungai Tengi is a small town in Selangor, Malaysia. The town is located near FELDA Soeharto.

The nearest exit to Sungai Tengi from the PLUS Highway is the Bukit Tagar Exit 119. Sungai Tengi can be reached through the right-turn after the Bukit Tagar Landfill.

Sungai Tengi is an oil palm plantation area with numerous Malay villages (such as Kampung Fajar and Kampung Soeharto). It is situated within the same hilly area as the Kuala Kubu Bharu Golf & Country Club, and the Sungai Tengi Homestay is located off the main road. Apart from these two attractions, the rest of the area is dominated by FELDA oil palm plantations.

The B33 trunk road in Selangor weaves through Sungai Tengi, reaching Kampung Soeharto before branching off to the B44 trunk road with a T-junction. The Sungai Tengi FELDA plantation is loosely joined with the FELDA Soeharto plantation and the FELDA Gendangsa plantation.

The nearest major towns to Sungai Tengi are Bestari Jaya to the south, and Behrang to the north.
