= Bukit Tagar Landfill =

Landfill in Selangor, Malaysia

Coordinates: 3.5038155°N 101.4711997°E

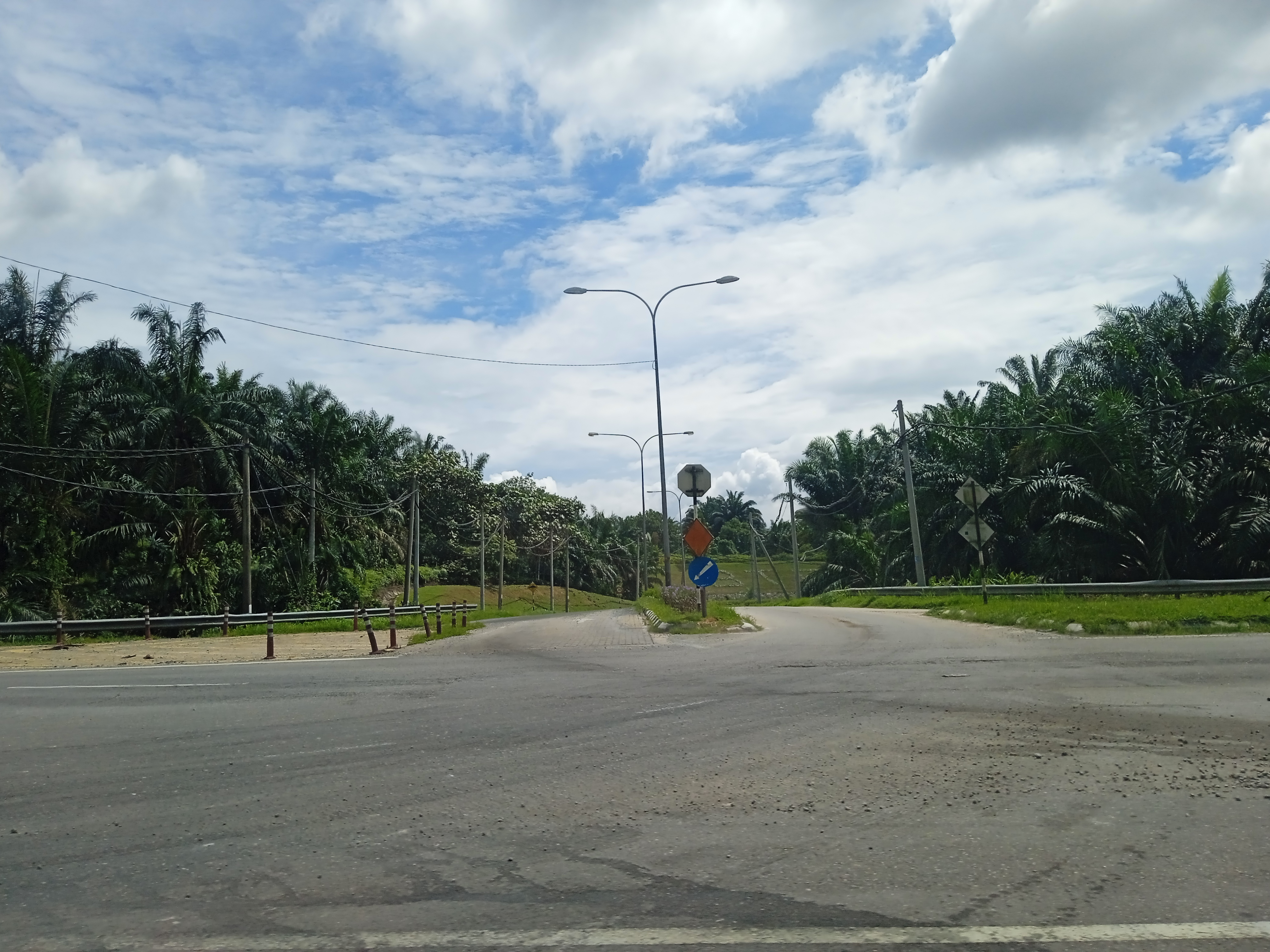
Bukit Tafar Landfill access road

Bukit Tagar Landfill (also known as Bukit Tagar Sanitary Landfill) is a landfill in Bukit Tagar, Selangor. It began operations in April 2005.

Located in the middle of an oil palm plantation, the landfill spans 680 hectares and is used for filling municipal solid waste coming from Selangor (Selayang Municipal Council and Hulu Selangor Municipal Council) and Kuala Lumpur (Kuala Lumpur City Hall). The landfill was developed by KUB-Berjaya Enviro Sdn Bhd, a joint-venture company between KUB Malaysia Berhad and Berjaya Corporation Berhad through a Build-Operate-Transfer scheme.

It also has a treatment plant for leachate.

As of 2006, Bukit Tagar Landfill could handle about 1,400 tonnes of garbage daily.
