= FELDA Soeharto =

Human settlement in Selangor, Malaysia

Coordinates: 3.6924598°N 101.3604818°E

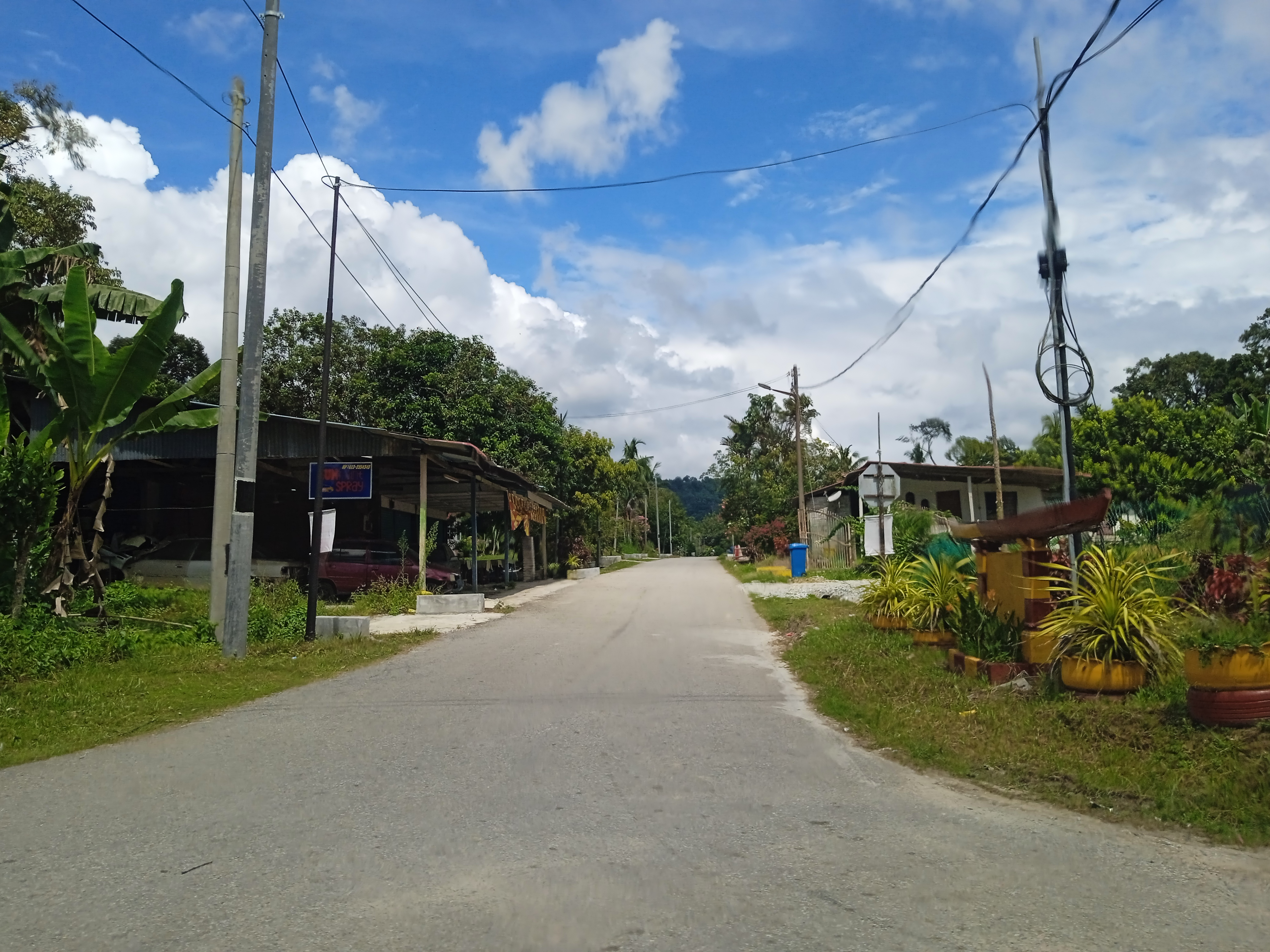

FELDA Soeharto or Kampung Soeharto is a FELDA settlement in Hulu Selangor District, Selangor, Malaysia. It is located near the Selangor-Perak border.

Established in 1962 as Felda Sungai Dusun, it was named in honour of the former Indonesian president Suharto, who visited this village on 18 March 1970.

== See also ==
- FELDA Lyndon B. Johnson
