= University of Selangor =

Private university in Malaysia

- Universiti Selangor (Malay)
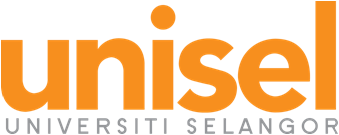
- Seal of the University of Selangor
- Former name: Universiti Industri Selangor
- Motto: A Leader of Transformation
- Type: Private
- Established: 23 August 1999
- Chairman: Amirudin Shari
- Chancellor: Y.A.D. Raja Tan Sri Arshad Bin Raja Tun Uda
- President: Prof. Dato' Dr Mohammad Redzuan Othman
- Vice-president: Prof. Dr. Md Sidin bin Ahmad Ishak
- Vice-Chancellor: Professor Dato' Dr. Mohammad Redzuan Bin Othman
- Undergraduates: 11000
- Location: Bestari Jaya (Batang Berjuntai), Shah Alam, Selangor, Malaysia
- Campus: Urban
- Language: Bahasa Malaysia & English
- Colours: Orange and Silver
- Website: www.unisel.edu.my

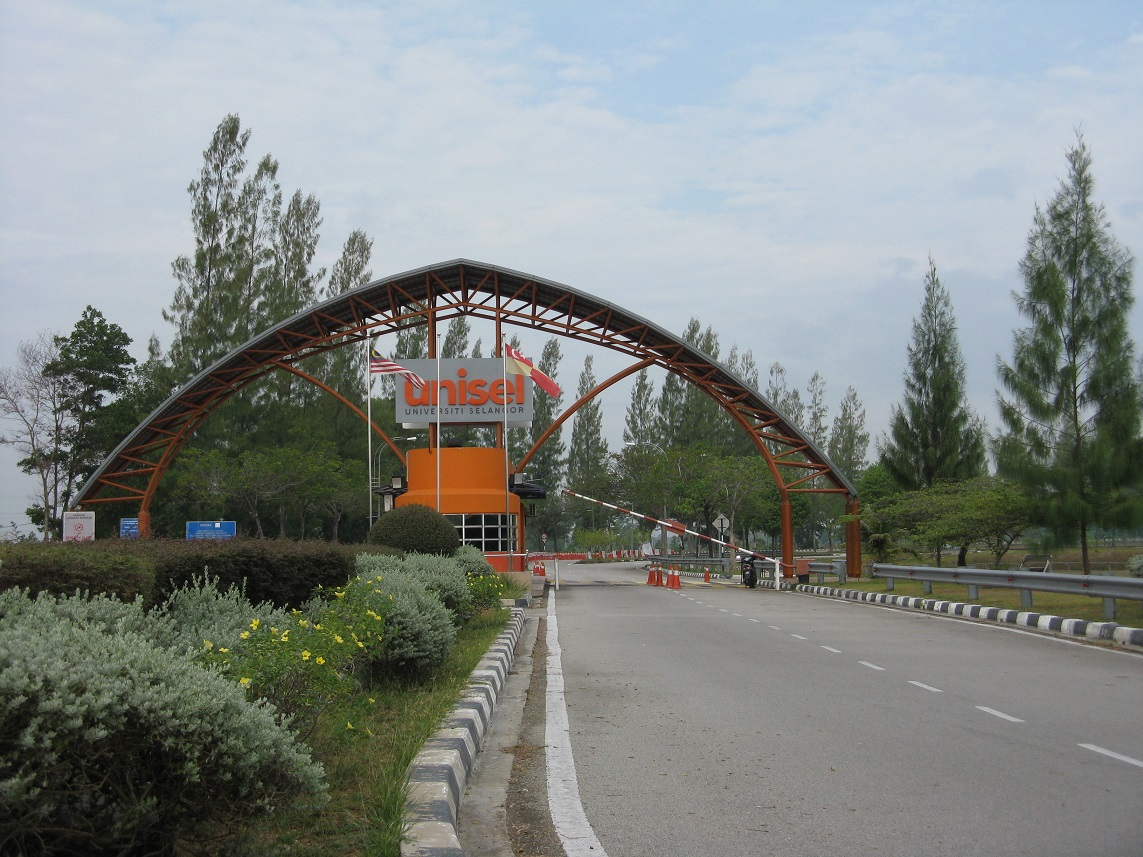
University of Selangor

The University of Selangor (abbreviation: UNISEL) is a private university in Selangor, Malaysia, wholly owned and managed by the Selangor state government independently — without funding from the Malaysian federal government (and is thus regarded as a "private" as opposed to a "public" university).

It operates two campuses: Bestari Jaya Campus & Shah Alam Campus.

== History ==
UNISEL was established on 23 August 1999 as the first state-funded semi-government university in Malaysia. It had the aim of providing tertiary education and opportunities for research and development in the broad sphere of industrial technology, management as well as information and communications technology.

It began operations from a temporary campus in Shah Alam. Its main campus in the township of Bestari Jaya, approximately 50 km from the federal capital of Kuala Lumpur, was completed in 2005. UNISEL now operates from the Shah Alam and Bestari Jaya campuses.

== Organisation and administration ==
UNISEL is owned and managed by the State Government of Selangor through UNISEL Sdn. Bhd.(formerly known Pendidikan Industri YS Sdn. Bhd.), a subsidiary of the state-owned investment arm, Kumpulan Darul Ehsan Berhad and established under the provisions of the Private Higher Education Institutions Act 1996. It is one of two institutions of higher education owned by the state government via PIYS: the other being INPENS International College.

=== Principal officers ===
==== Chancellors ====
| # | Chancellor | Term in office |
|---|---|---|
| 1 | Datin Seri Rosmah Mansor | 2006 - 2011 |
| 2 | Raja Tan Sri Dato' Seri Ashad Alhaj Bin Raja Tun Uda Alhaj | 2011 - onwards |

==== Vice-chancellors ====
| # | Vice ChancellorPROF DATO KAMARUDDUN HAJI KACAR 199.2002 | Term in office |
|---|---|---|
| 1 | Abdul Aziz Ibrahim | 1999 - 2005 |
| 2 | Adnan Alias | 2005 - 2006 |
| 3 | Mohd Razali Agus | 2007 - 2008 |
| 4 | Datuk Dr. Rosti Saruwono | 2009 - 2011 |
| 5 | Anuar Bin Ahmad | 2011 - 2015 |
| 6 | Prof. Dato' Dr. Mohammad Redzuan Othman | 2016 - onwards |

== Campuses and faculties ==
UNISEL operates from two campuses: one in the township of Bestari Jaya and another in the state capital, Shah Alam.

=== Bestari Jaya ===
The main campus is on a 1,000-acre (4.0 km^{2}) lot which is part of a 4,000 acres (16 km^{2}) piece of land that has been earmarked as the Selangor Educational Park. It is the location of the following faculties:

- Faculty of Education and Social Sciences
- Faculty of Engineering & Life Sciences
  - Engineering Department
  - Science & Biotechnology Department (known formerly as Faculty of Science and Biotechnology. Established prior to 1999 as Faculty of Applied Science and Mathematics and Faculty of Science and Environmental Technology)
- Faculty of Communication, Visual Art and Computing:
  - Computing Department
  - Communication Department
  - Visual Art Department

(https://fcvac.unisel.edu.my)

- Centre for Foundation and General Studies

=== Shah Alam ===
The Shah Alam campus is in Section 7 of the city and is the location of the following faculties

- Faculty of Business and Accountancy

(https://fba.unisel.edu.my/)

- Faculty of Health Sciences (https://fsk.unisel.edu.my)

== See also ==
- List of universities in Malaysia
- AAK-UNISEL FC
