= Road signs in Malaysia =

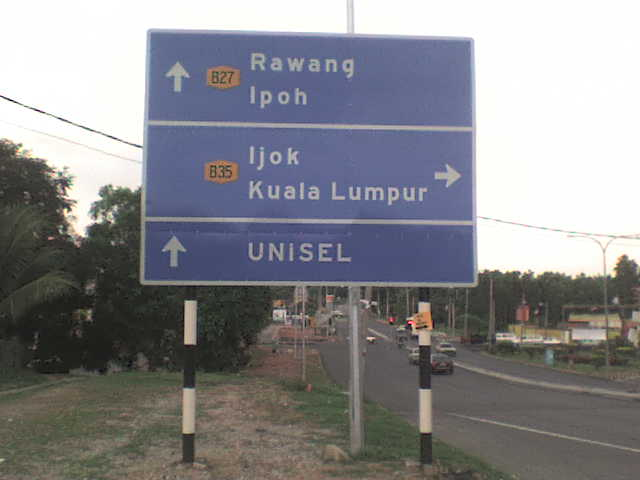
The common Malaysian state road signboard which shares the same characteristics as the Malaysian federal road signs.

Road signs in Malaysia are standardised road signs similar to those used in Europe but with certain distinctions. Until the early 1980s, Malaysia closely practice in road sign design, with diamond-shaped warning signs and circular restrictive signs to regulate traffic. Signs usually use the Transport Heavy (cf. the second image shown to the right) font on non-tolled roads and highways, although newer signs usually use Highway Gothic and Arial. Tolled expressways signs use a font specially designed for the Malaysian Highway Authority (LLM) which is LLM Lettering. It has two type of typefaces, LLM Narrow and LLM Normal.

Malaysian traffic signs use Malay, the official and national language of Malaysia. However, English is also used for used at public places such as tourist attractions, airports, railway stations and immigration checkpoints. Both Malay and English are used in the road signs that are located along the Pengerang Highway (Federal Route 92), which links Kota Tinggi to Sungai Rengit in Johor state and Genting Sempah–Genting Highlands Highway which links Genting Sempah to Genting Highlands, which also have Chinese and Tamil on signs.

According to the road category under Act 333, the Malaysian Road Transport Act 1987, chapter 67, blue traffic signs are used for federal, state and municipal roads. Green signs are used for toll expressways or highways only. There are four major types of road signs in Malaysia. First is Warning Signs (Tanda Amaran), second is Prohibition Signs (Tanda Larangan), third is Mandatory Signs (Tanda Wajib) and fourth is Information Signs (Tanda Maklumat).

== Route Number ==
=== Expressway ===
Expressways use letters E-- (Example: North–South Expressway Northern Route)

Exits numbers usually starts with the Expressway route number and then exit number (Example: West Coast Expressway Exit 23 Teluk Intan (Exit 3223))

| Examples | Information | Number digits |
|---|---|---|
| North–South Expressway Southern Route; Guthrie Corridor Expressway | Expressway route numbers | E01 – E99 |
| 253; 1108 | Expressway exit numbers | EXIT 201 – EXIT 299; EXIT 1101 – 1199 |

=== Federal ===
Federal Roads only use numbers and digits, for example Federal Route 1 (Example: Federal Route 1). However, federal road numbers can also be added with the FT— prefix before the route number, which is normally used by the Malaysian Public Works Department (JKR) and the Royal Malaysia Police. For example, Federal Route 1 can also be written as Federal Route FT1. There are also service roads off of main federal roads that use letters after its main route (Example: FT 2A).

| Examples | Information | Number digits |
|---|---|---|
| FT 5 FT 24; FT 222 | Main federal route numbers | 001–249 |
| FT 276; FT 423 | Institutional facilities federal roads | 250–479 |
| | Federal road exit numbers | EXIT 1 – EXIT 99 |
| FT 1 FT 1-15; FT 22; FT 3 | Main federal route numbers (Sarawak and Sabah) | 1-1 – 1–59; 4-1 – 4–99; 1000 – 9999 |
| FT 700 | Main federal route numbers (Labuan) | 700–799 |
| FT 1123; FT 2486 | FELDA/FELCRA federal route numbers | 1000 – 1999; 2000 – 2999 |
| FT 3214; FT 3374 | Industrial federal route numbers | 3000 – 3999 |
| FT 2A; FT 2B | Service road numbers | --A – --Z |

=== State ===
State roads use letters that correspond to each state. The state letter codes roughly matches the plate numbers prefix alphabet.

| Examples | Information | Number digits |
|---|---|---|
| J32 | Johor state route numbers | J001 – J999 |
| B34 | Selangor state route numbers | B001 – B999 |
| N34 | Negeri Sembilan state route numbers | N001 – N999 |
| SA3 | Sabah state route numbers | SA001 – SA999 |
| A117 | Perak state route numbers | A001 - A999 |
| C243 | Pahang state route numbers | C001 - C999 |
| D12 | Kelantan state route numbers | D001 - D999 |
| K1 | Kedah state route numbers | K001 - K999 |
| M67 | Malacca state route numbers | M001 - M999 |
| P10 | Pulau Pinang state route numbers | P001 - P999 |
| T23 | Terengganu state route numbers | T001 - T999 |
| R55 | Perlis state route numbers | R001 - R999 |
| Q600 | Sarawak state route numbers | Q001 - Q999; Q1000 - Q9999 |

Federal roads route code shield

State roads route code shield

Expressway (toll road) route code shield

Service road route code shield

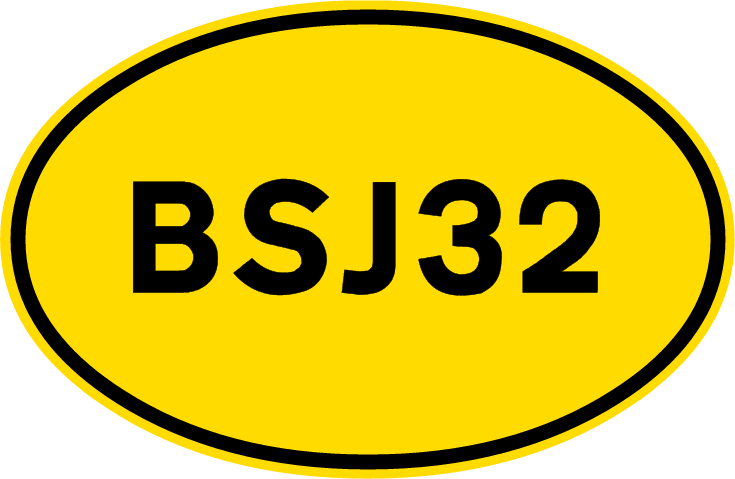
Local authority route code shield

== Warning signs ==
Malaysian warning signs are diamond-shaped or rectangular and are yellow and black or red and white in colour.

Uneven surface

Double curve to the right

Double curve to the left

Crossroads

Level crossing with gates ahead

Level crossing with automatic gates ahead

Level crossing without gates ahead

Level Crossing

Downhill slope ahead with gradient of 10%

Uphill slope ahead with gradient of 10%

Curve to the left

Curve to the right

Winding road (Option 1)

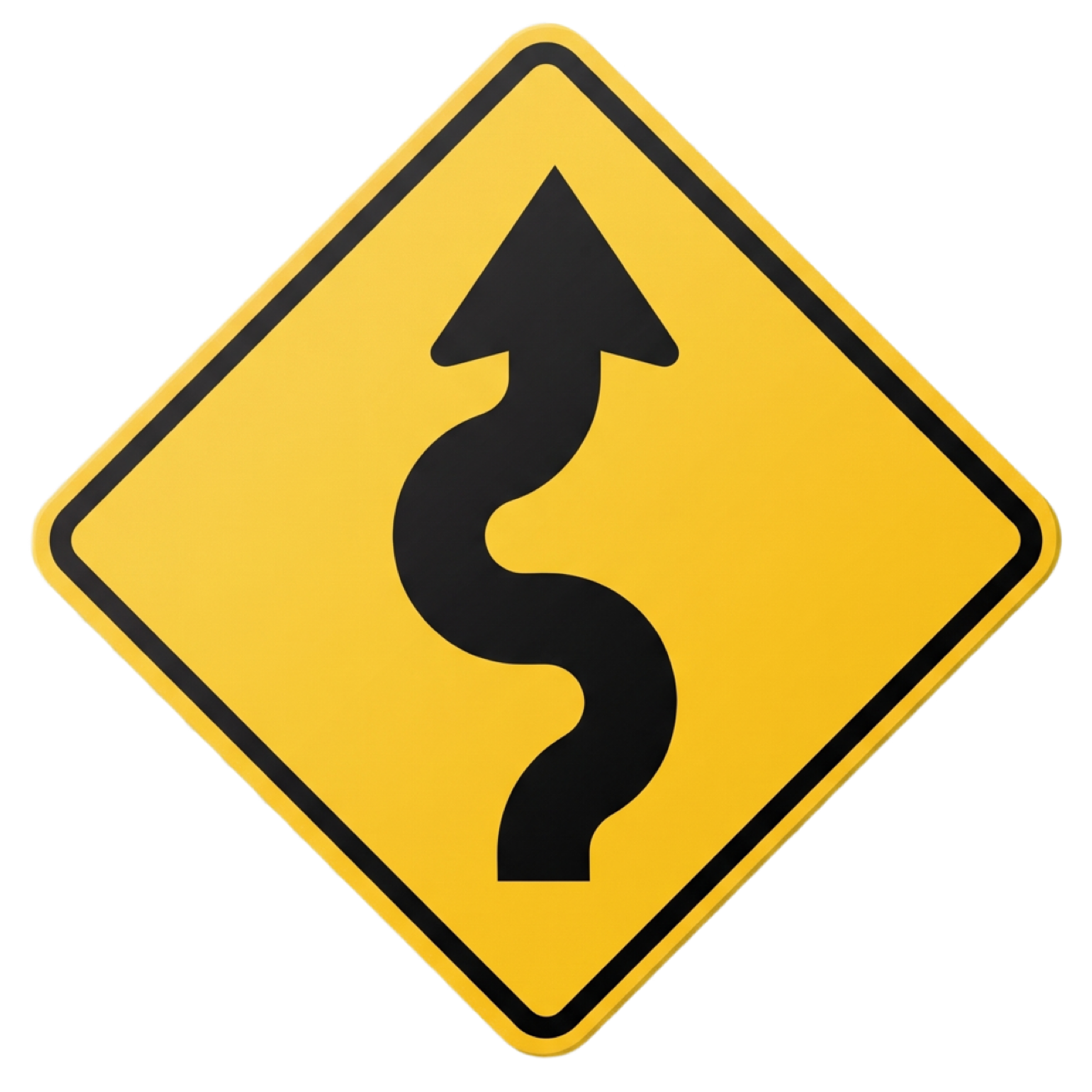
Winding road (Option 2)

Dangerous shoulder

Slippery surface

Pedestrians

Children

Other dangers nearby

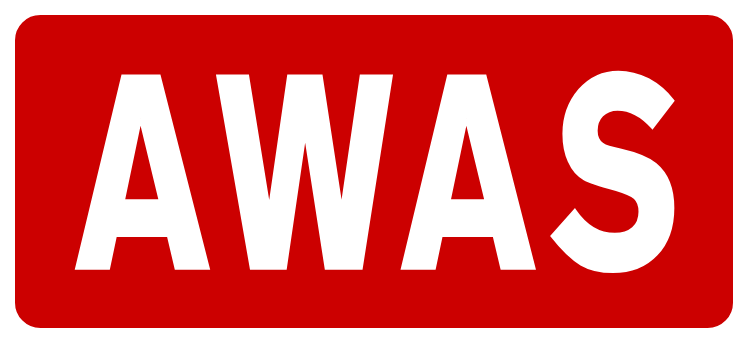
Caution (option 1)

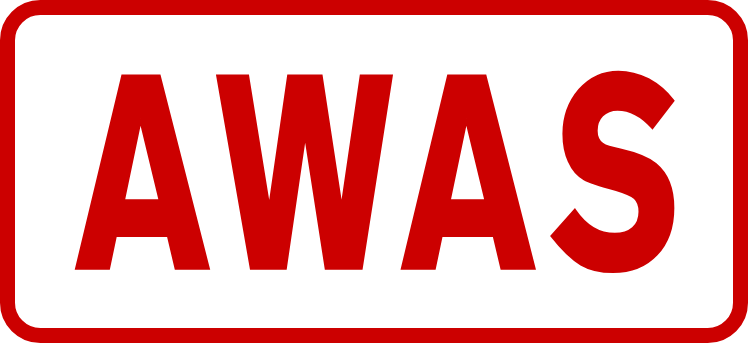
Caution (option 2)

Stop sign ahead

Give way sign ahead

Road narrows

Road narrows on the left

Road narrows on the right

Traffic signals ahead

Obstruction ahead

Obstruction marker

Stacked crossroad junctions

Stacked crossroad junctions, no entry on first junction on the right

Stacked crossroad junctions, no entry on first junction on the left

Stacked crossroad junctions, no entry on preceding junction on the right

Stacked crossroad junctions, no entry on preceding junction on the left

T-junction

Crossroad on the right

Crossroad on the left

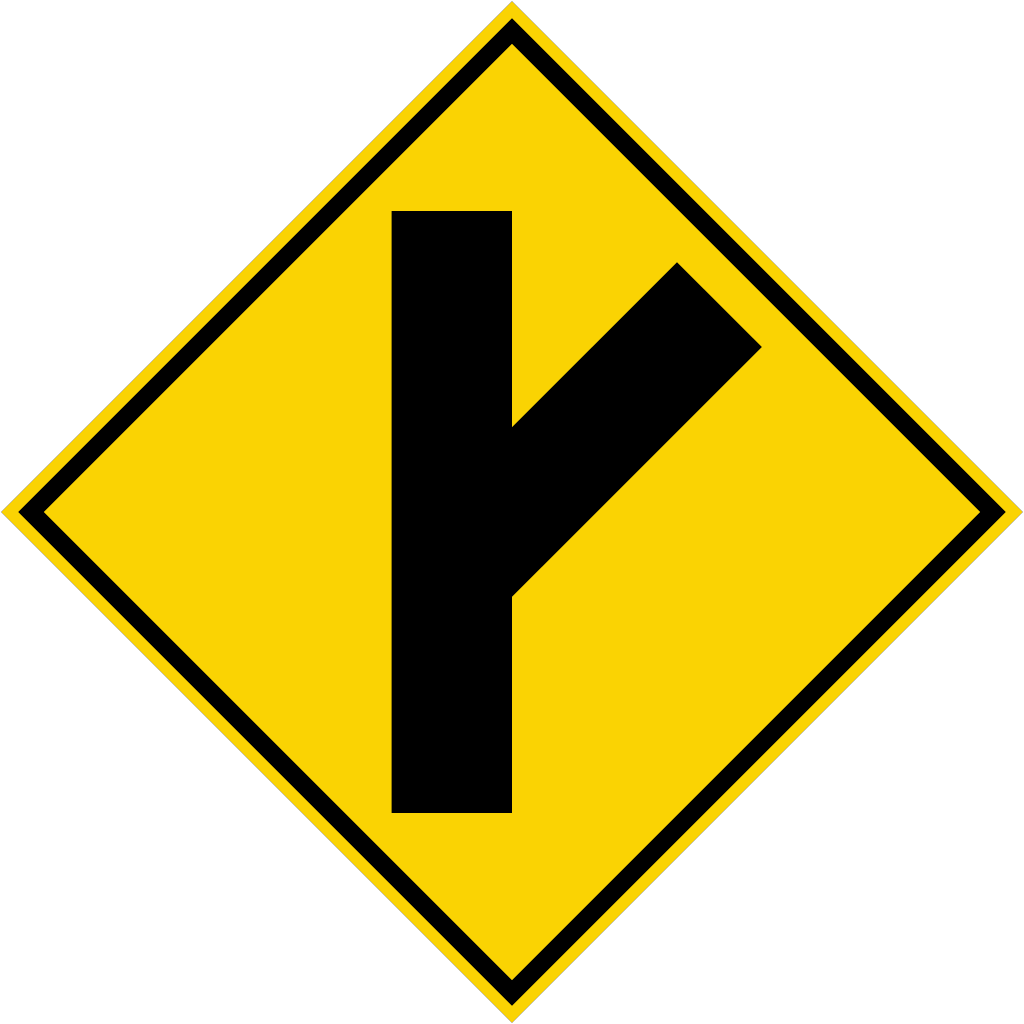
Road junction on the right

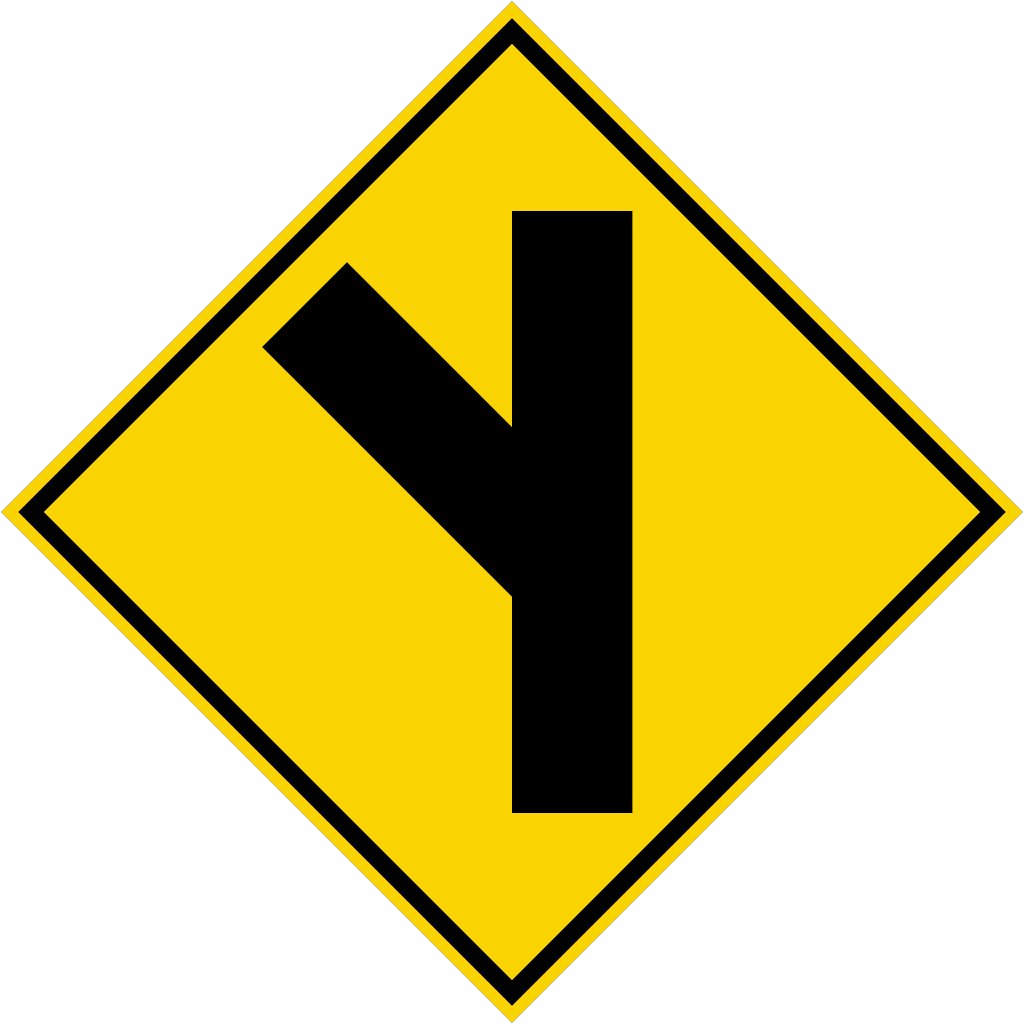
Road junction on the left

Traffic merging from the right

Traffic merging from the left

Falling rocks on right

Falling rocks on left

Domestic animals

Roundabout ahead

Three-lane carriageway ahead, with one lane in the opposing direction

Three-lane carriageway ahead, with two lanes in the opposing direction.

Blind pedestrians

Handicap crossing

Narrow bridge

Roadway diverges

Two-way traffic

Divided highway ends

Divided highway ahead

Chevron (right)

Chevron (left)

Weigh station ahead

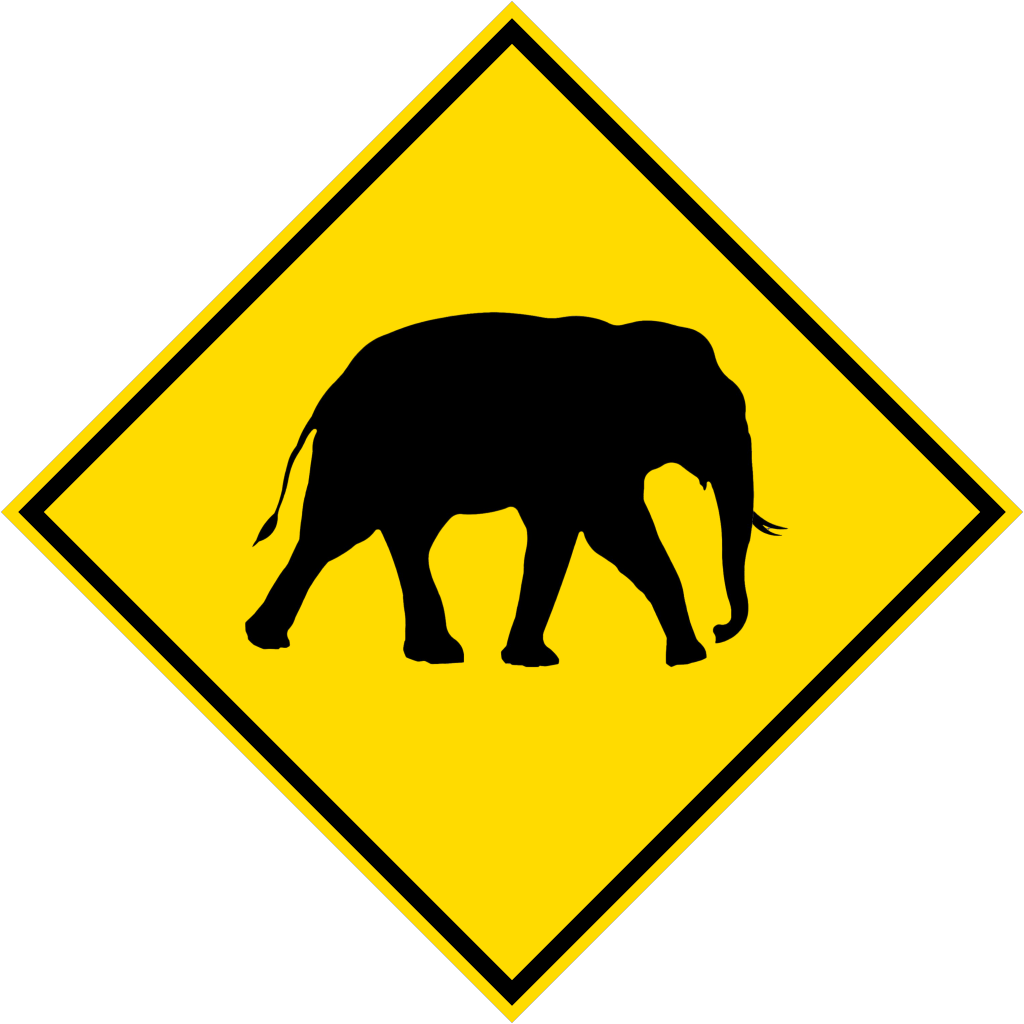
Wild elephant crossing

Wildlife crossing

Road junction on the left and right

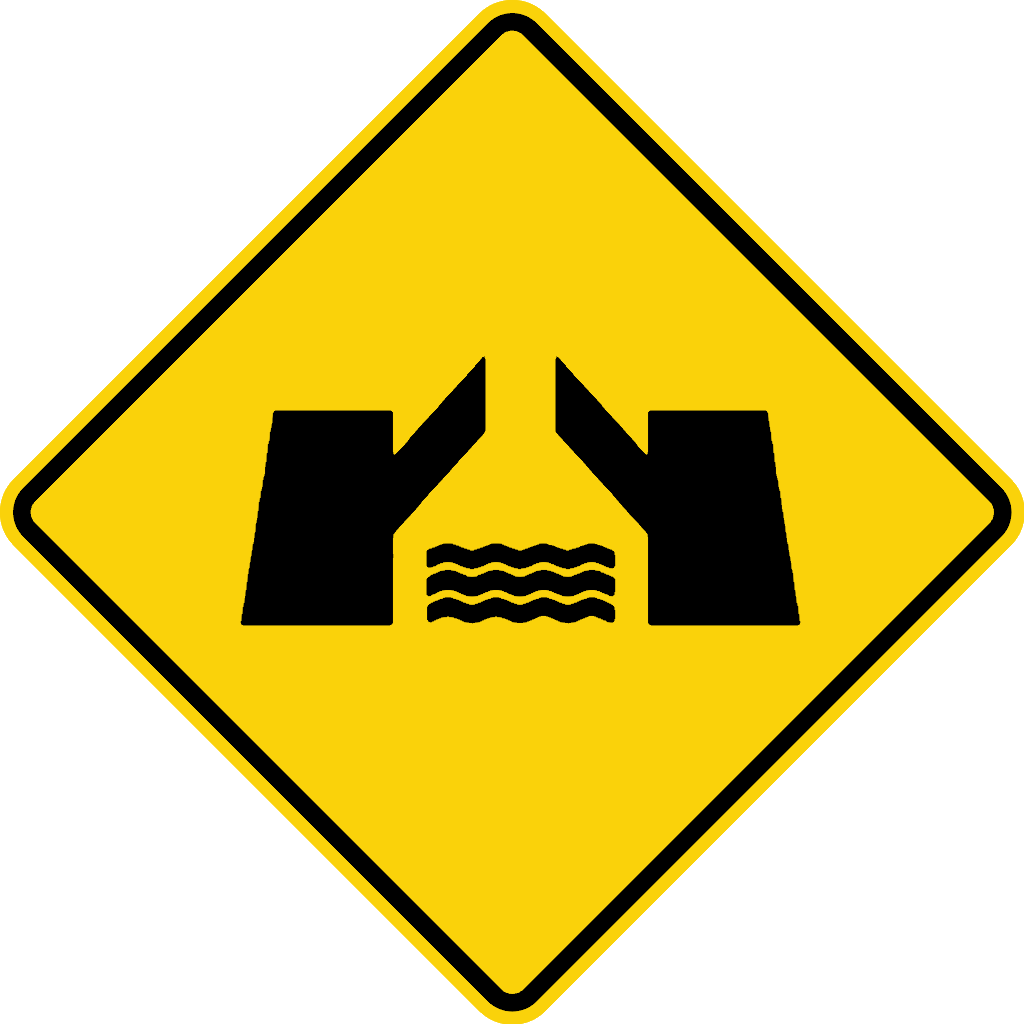
Drawbridge Ahead

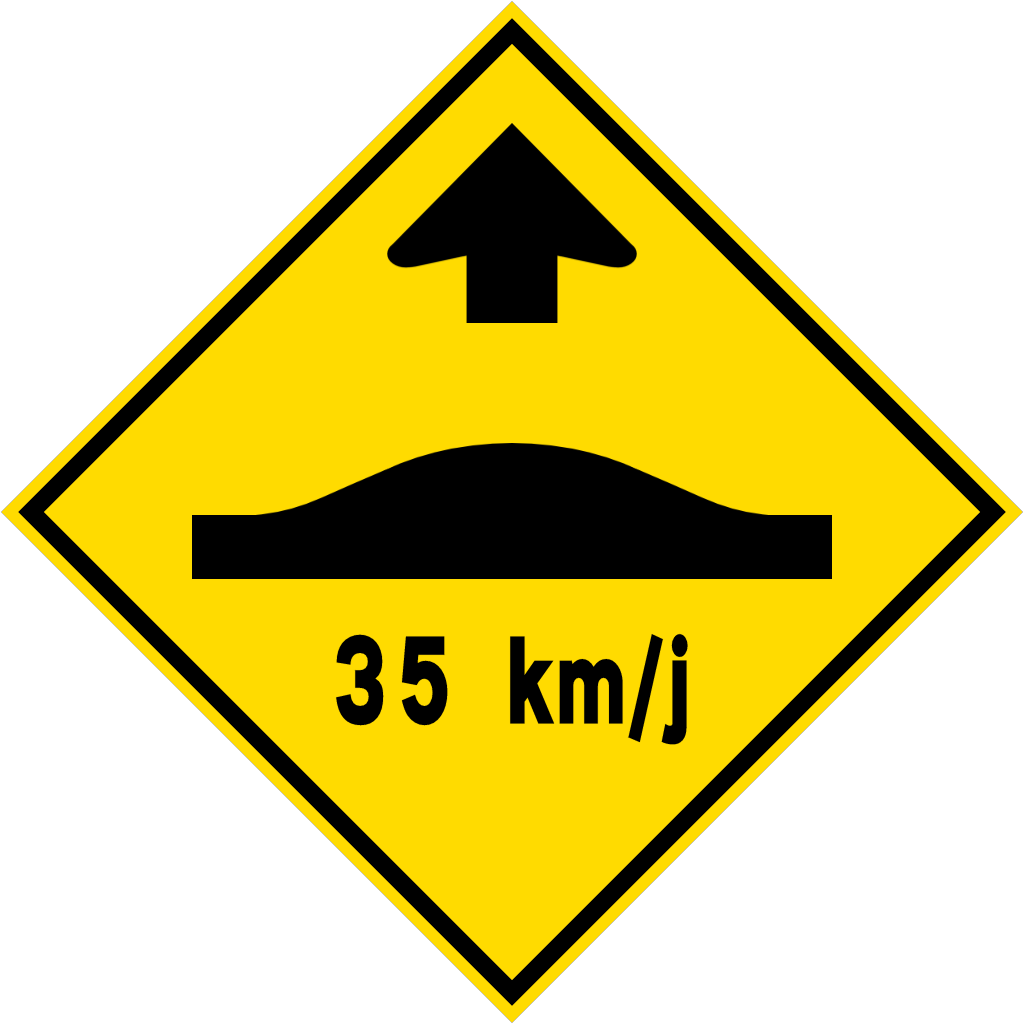
Hump ahead with speed limit

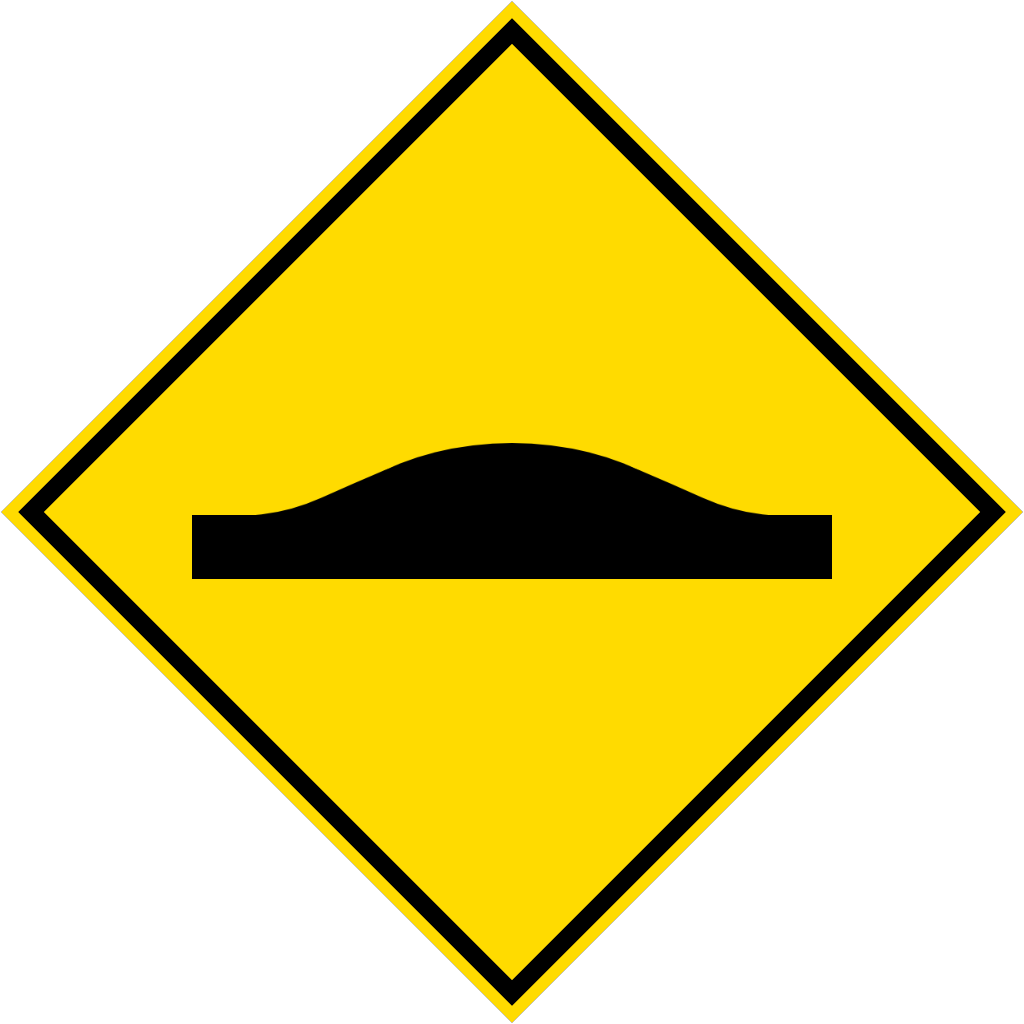
Hump

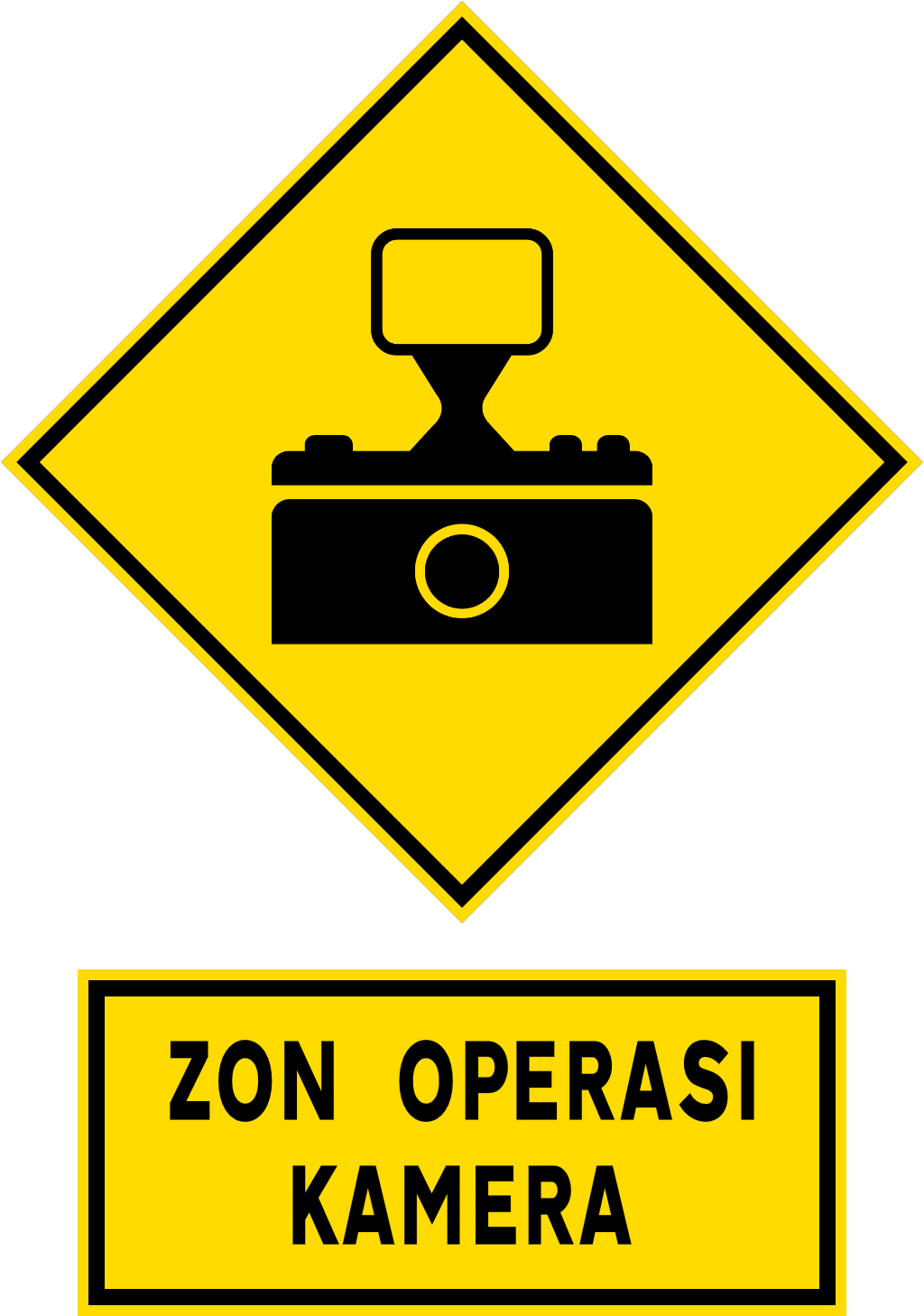
Camera operation zone (AES)

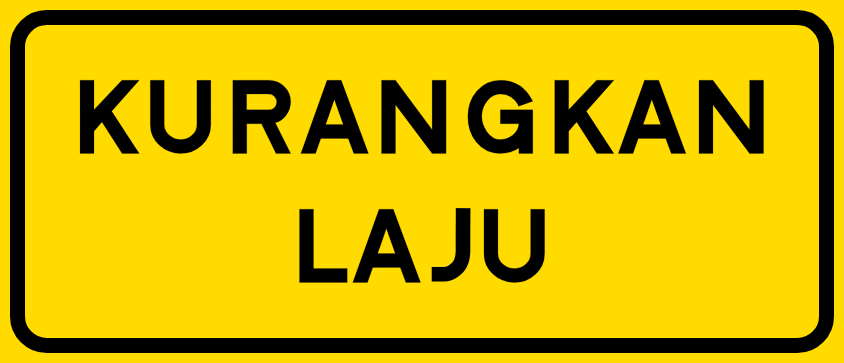
Reduce speed

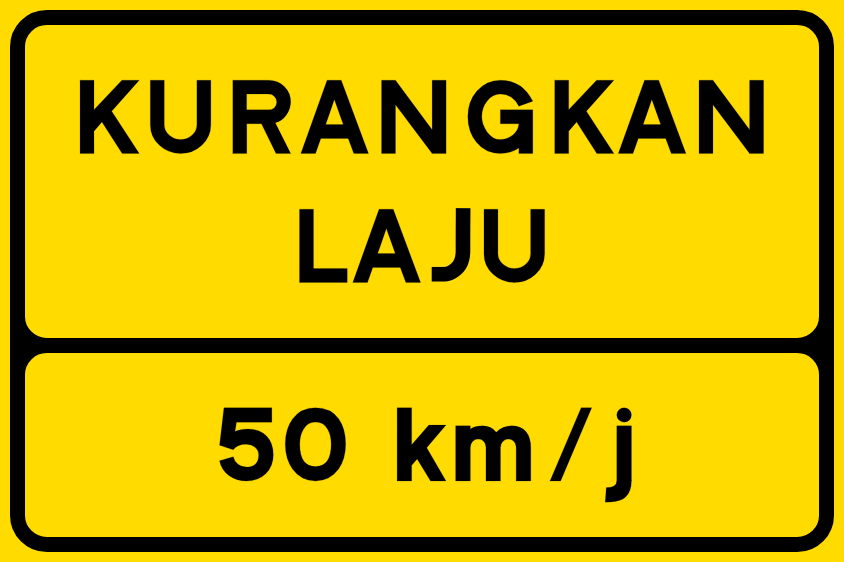
Reduce speed with speed limit

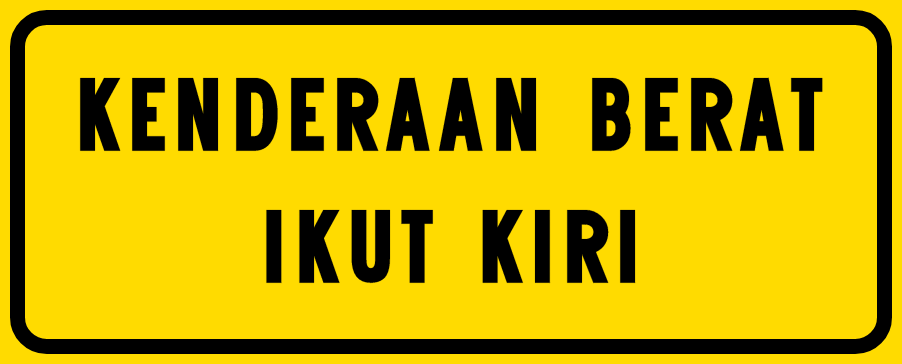
Heavy vehicles, keep left

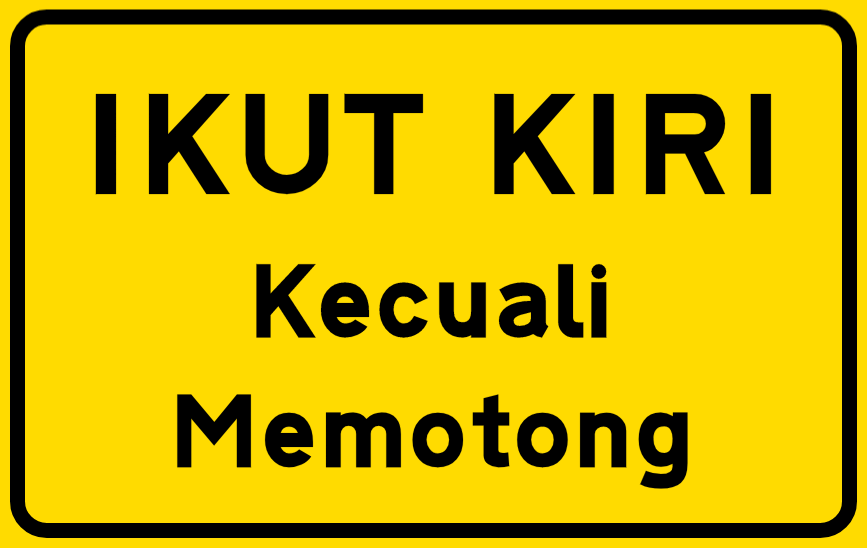
Keep left, except overtaking

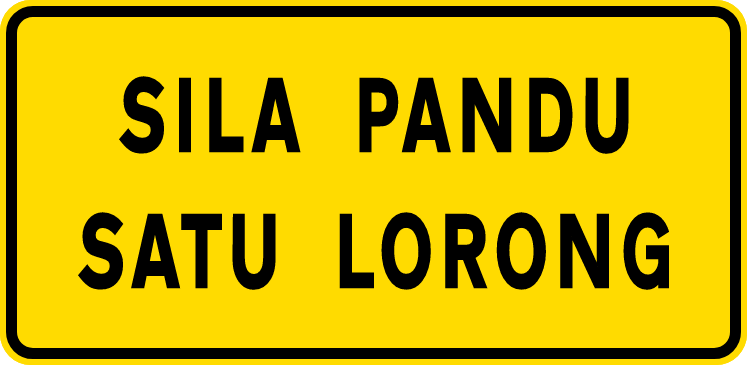
Please drive in a single lane

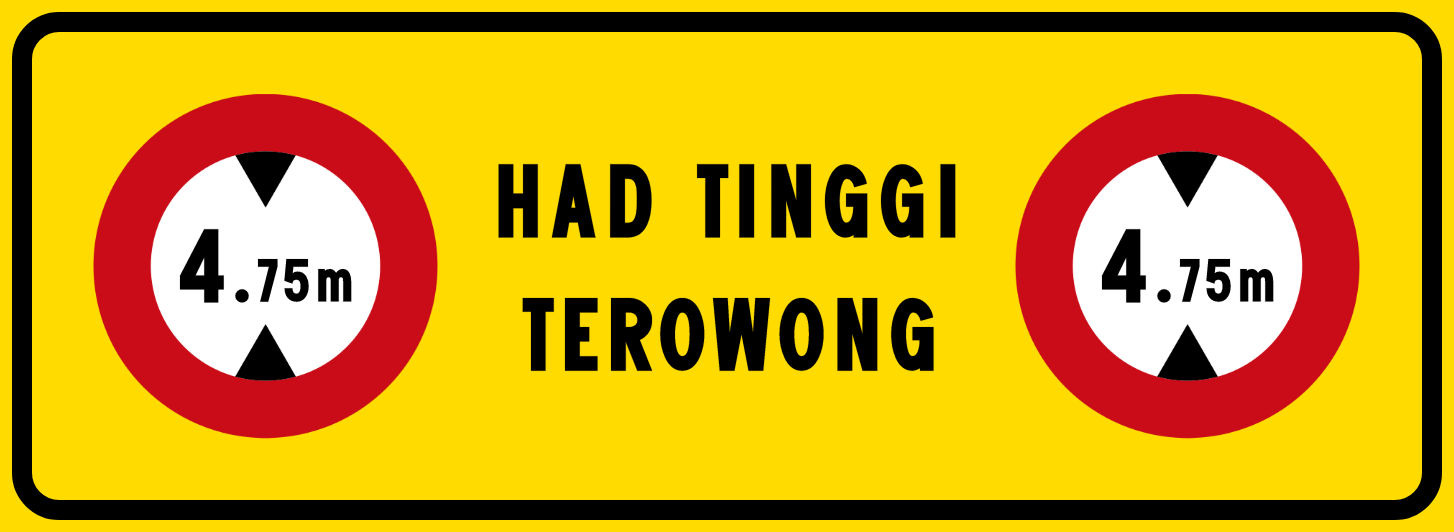
Tunnel height limit

Foggy area

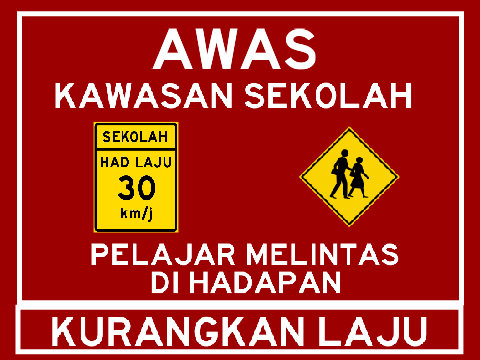
School crossing ahead

Blind people crossing

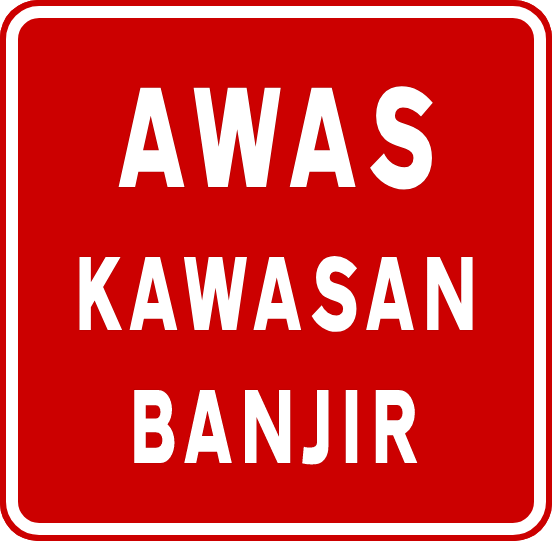
Flood area

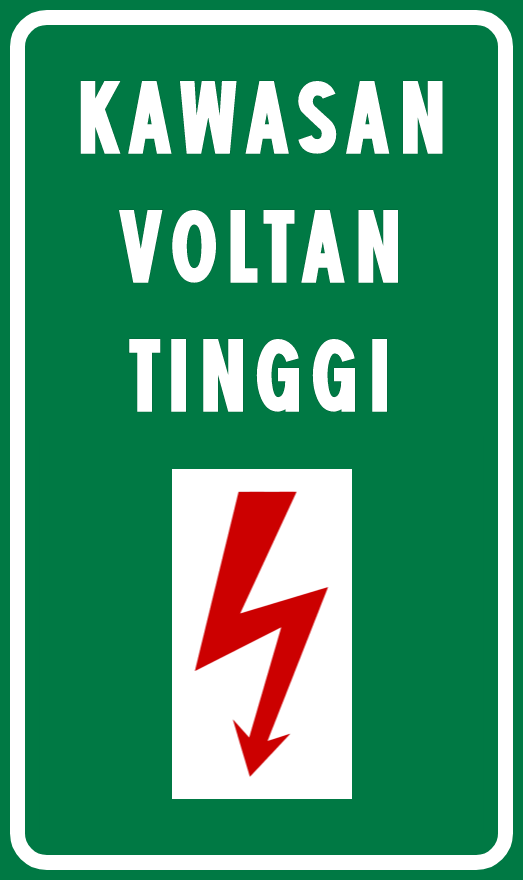
High voltage area

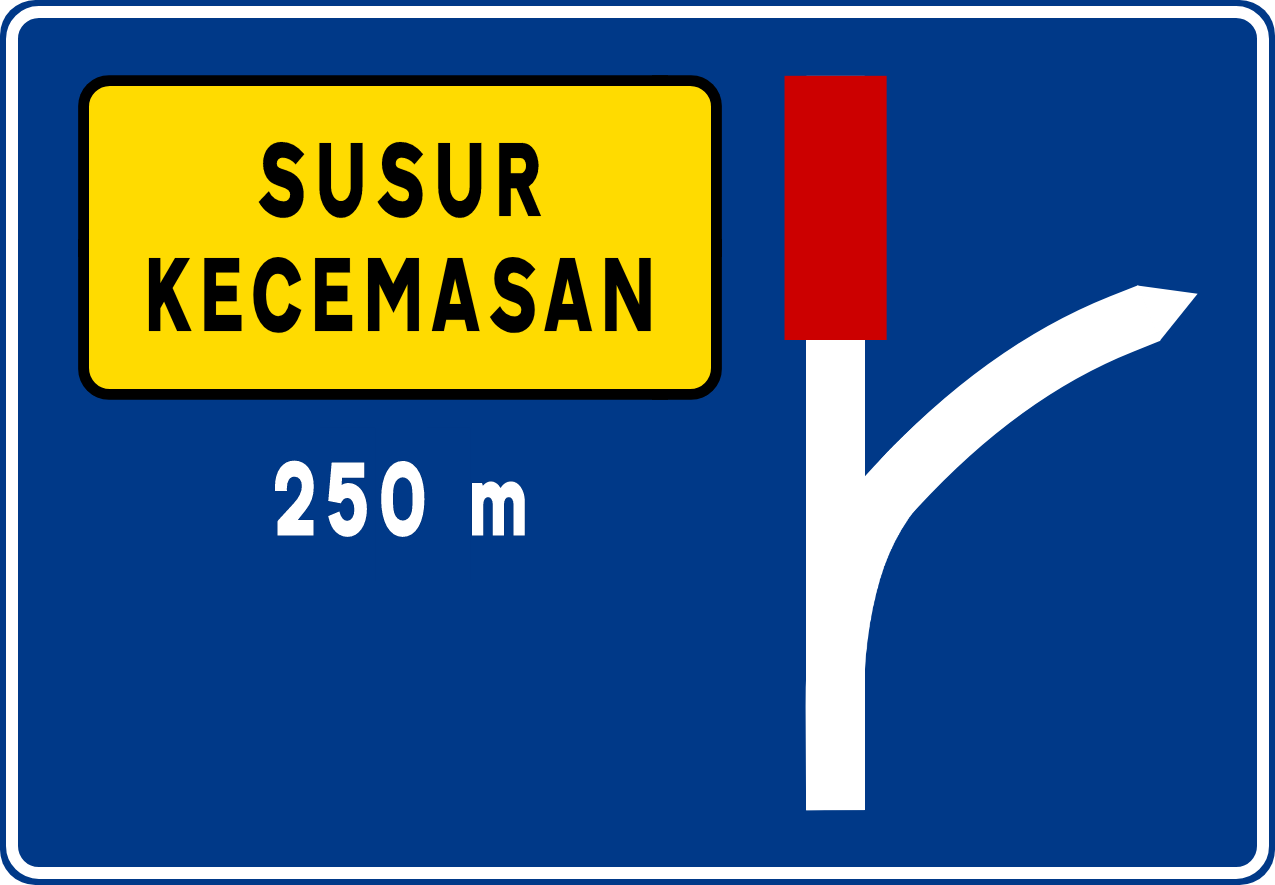
Emergency escape ramp 250 meters ahead

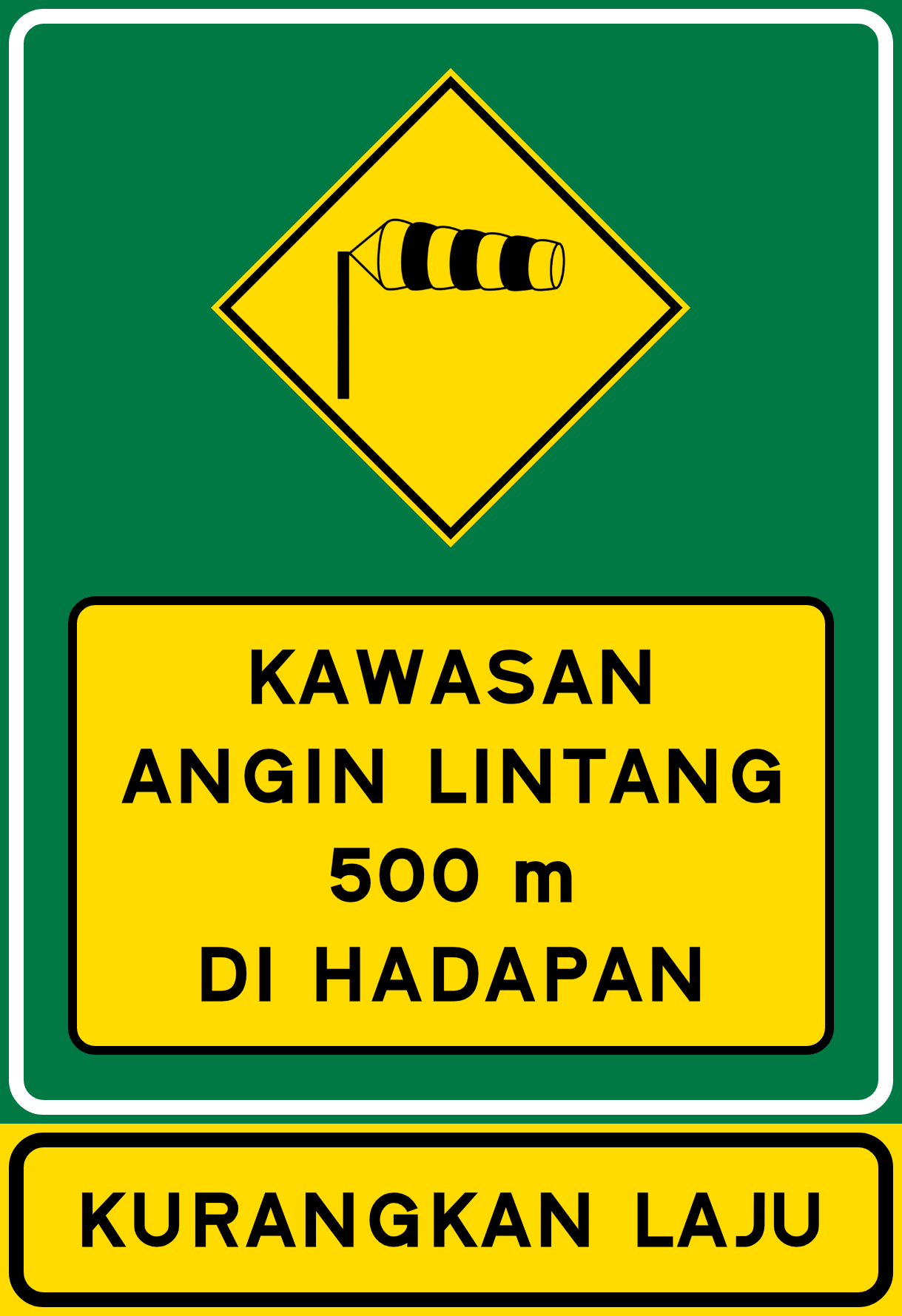
Crosswind area 500 meters ahead

== Prohibition signs ==
Malaysia prohibition signs are round with red outline and black pictogram.

Stop

Stop, children crossing

Give way traffic

No left turn

No right turn

No U-turns

No entry

Weight limit

Height limit

Width limit

No cyclists with 4 or less wheels

No motorcyclists

No trucks

No cyclists

No slow moving vehicles

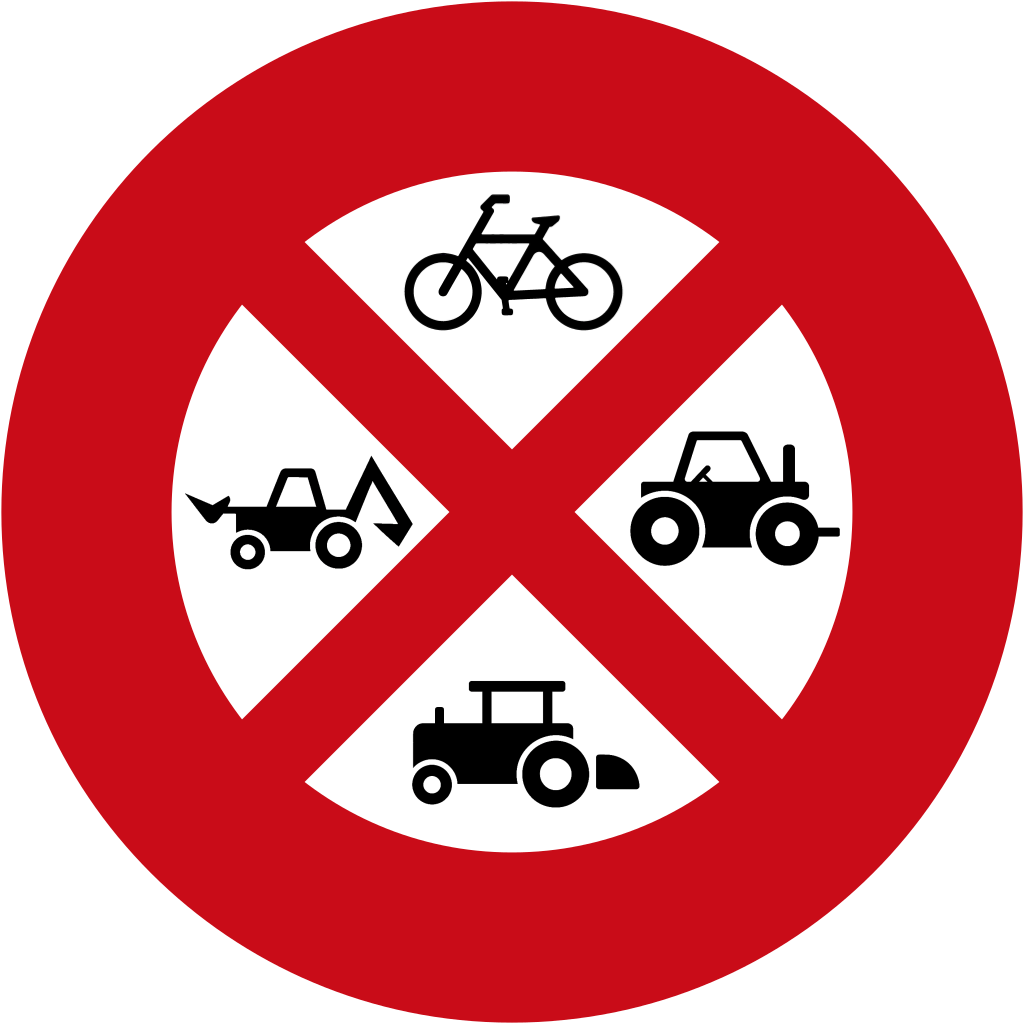
No slow moving vehicles

No mopeds

No parking

No stopping

No honking area

No overtaking

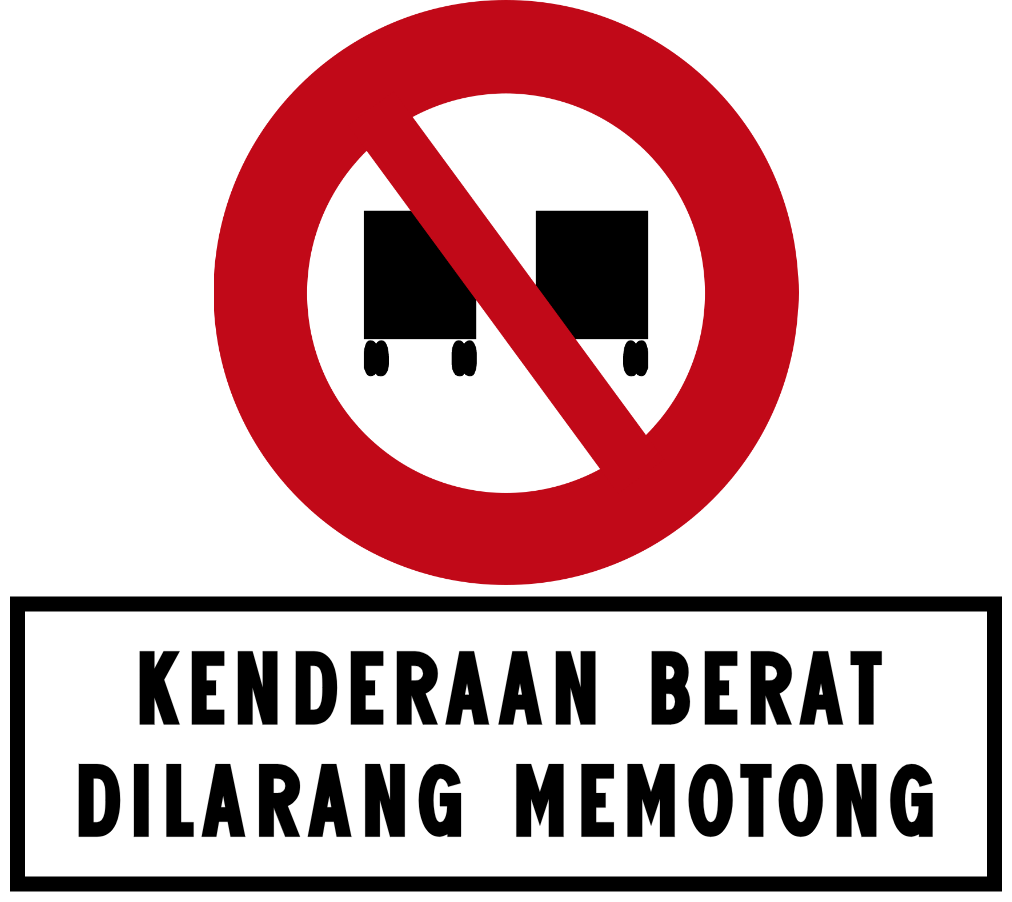
Overtaking for heavy vehicles not allowed

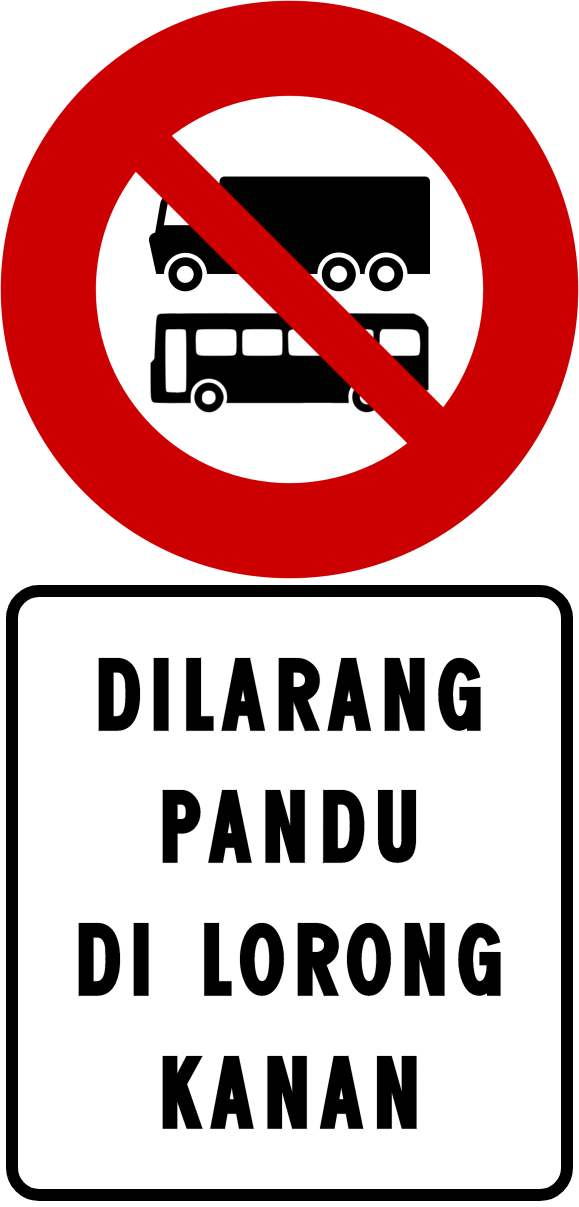
Lorry and bus are not allowed on the right lane

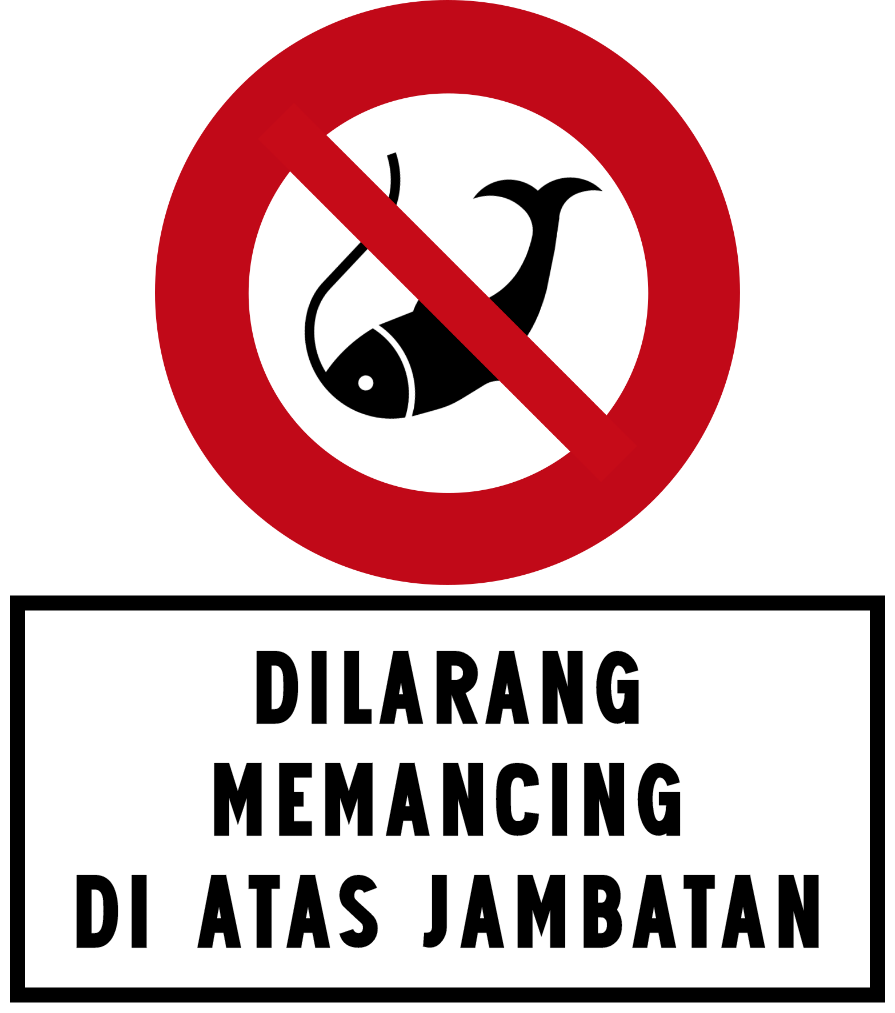
No fishing on the bridge

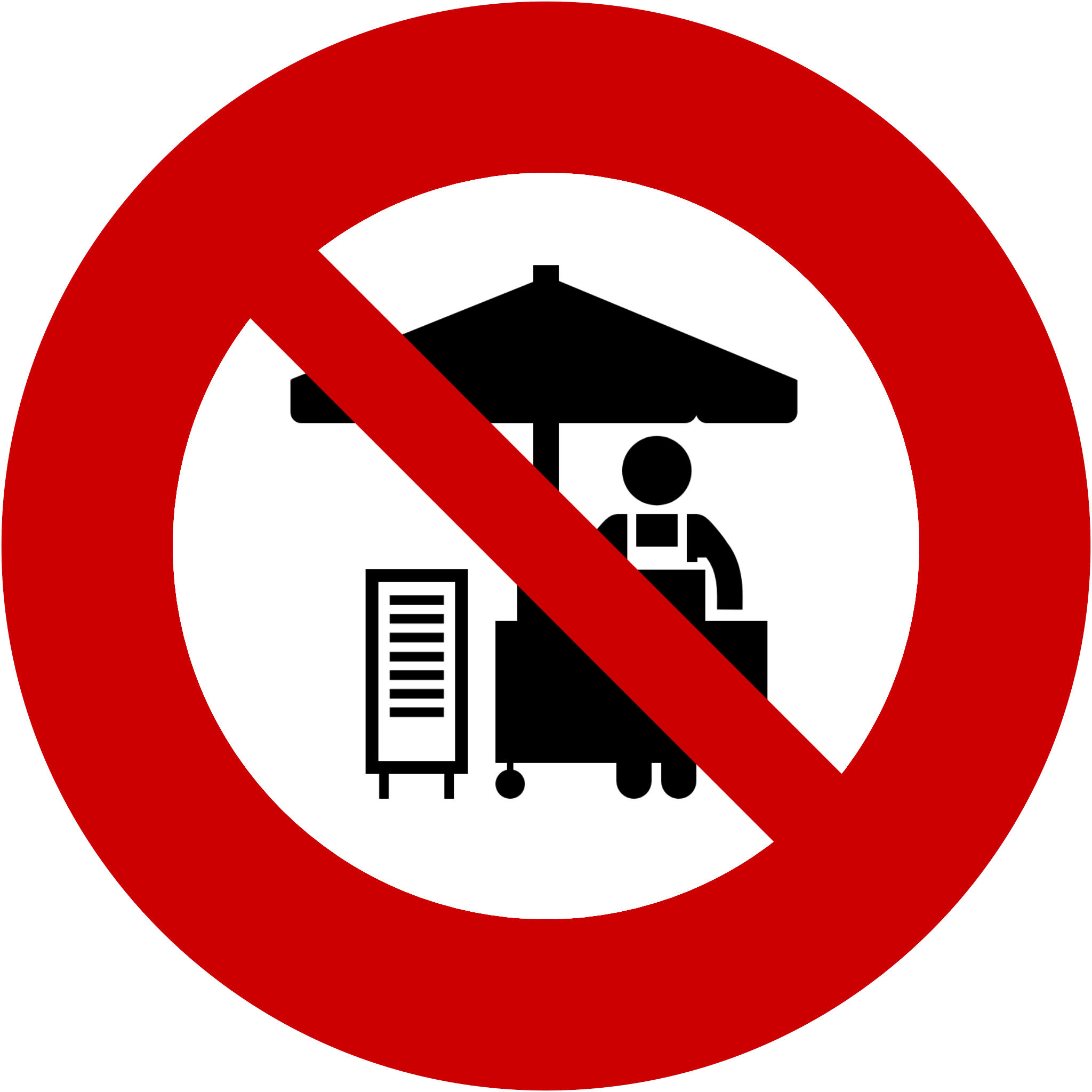
No hawking

== Mandatory signs ==
Mandatory instruction signs are round with blue backgrounds and white pictogram. These are also used in signifying specific vehicle type lanes.

Turn left

Turn right

Go straight ahead

Go straight or turn left

Go straight or turn right

Turn left ahead

Turn right ahead

Bicycle lane

Rickshaws only

Motorcycles only

Trishaws only

Only vehicles shown are allowed

Pass on the left

Pass on the right

Pass either side

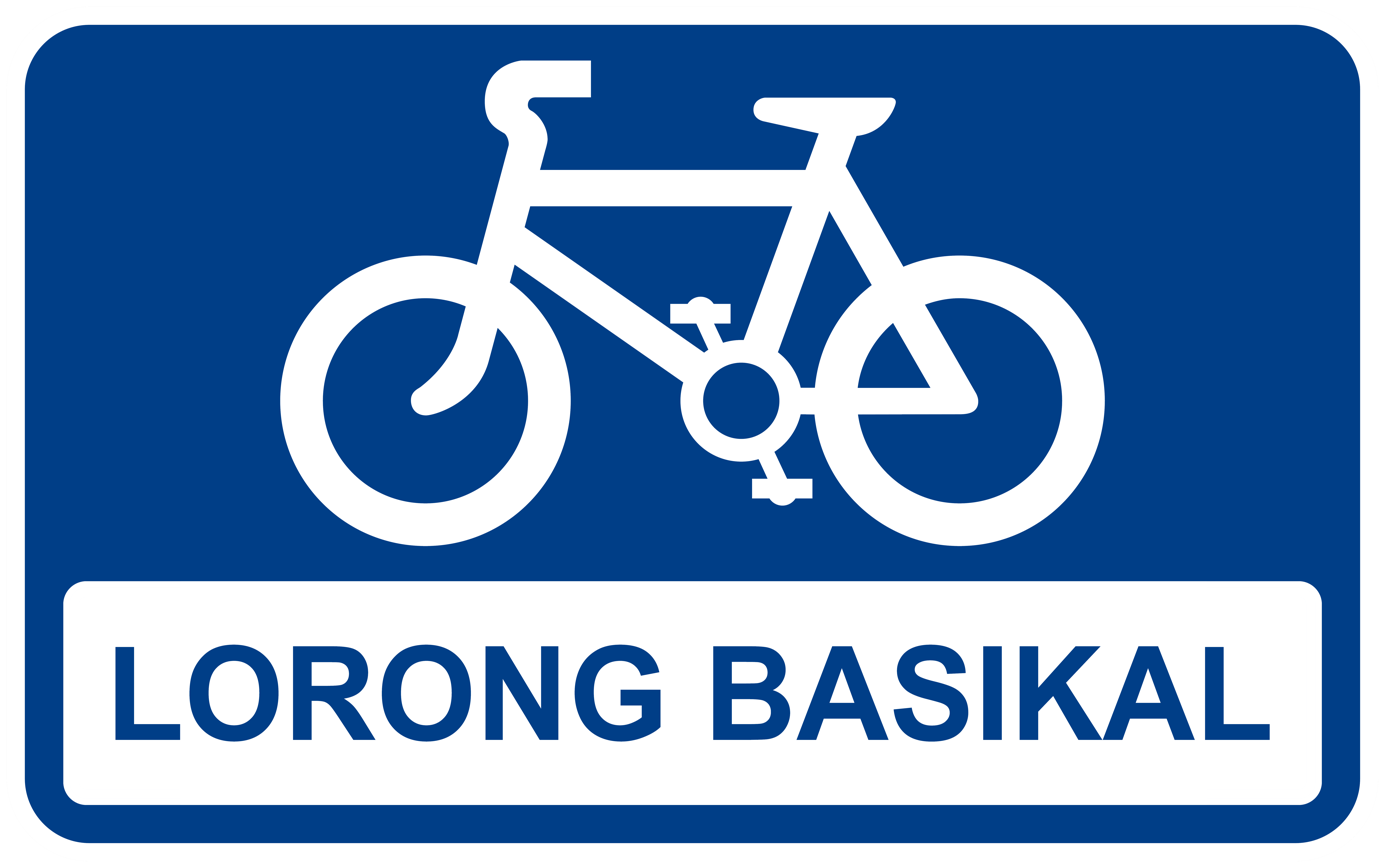
Bicycle lane with description (Rectangular)

One-way traffic

== Speed limit signs ==
These signs show speed limit on roads.

Speed limit without km/h

Speed limit

End of speed limit

Speed limit zone ahead

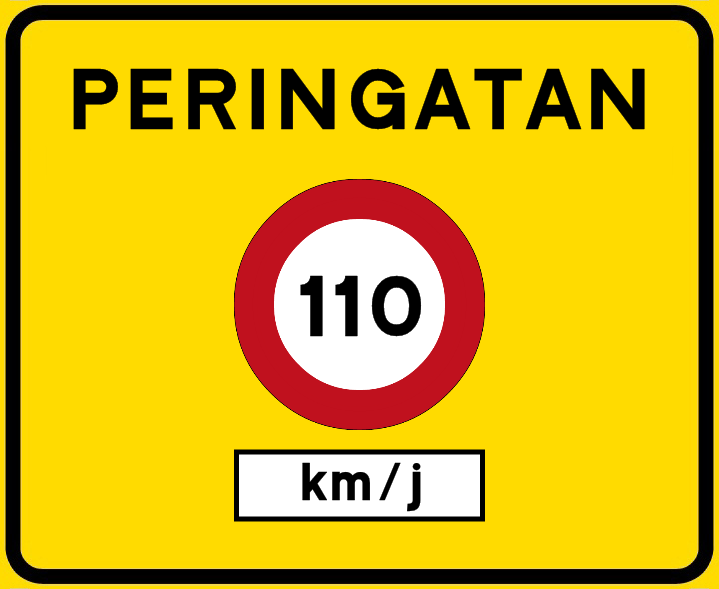
Speed limit reminder

School zone speed limit

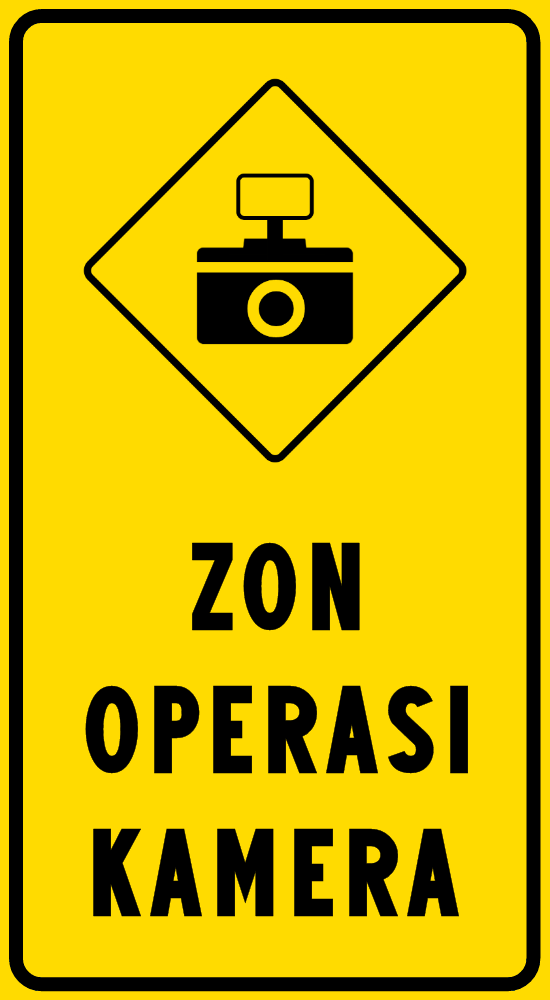
Speed trap camera (AES) (option 1)

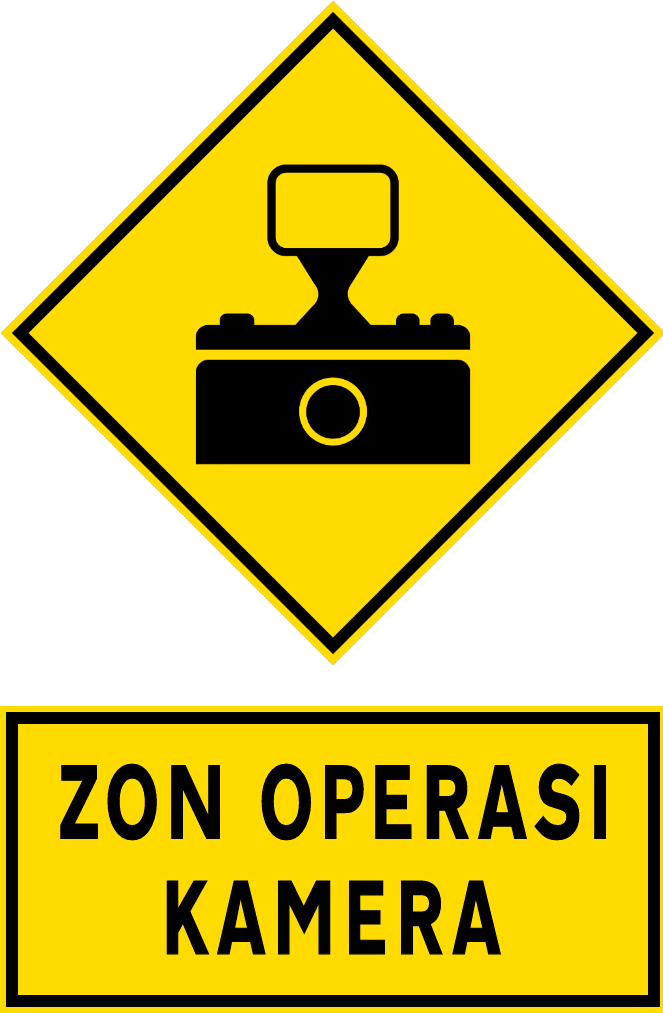
Speed trap camera (AES) (option 2)

== Construction signs ==
The construction signs in Malaysia are diamond-shaped placed on rectangular sign and are orange and black in colour.

Roadworks

Caution

Left lane closed ahead

Center lane closed ahead

Right lane closed ahead

Other dangers nearby

Curve to the right

Curve to the left

Road narrows on the left

Road narrows on the right

Chevron (right)

Chevron (left)

Roadway diverges

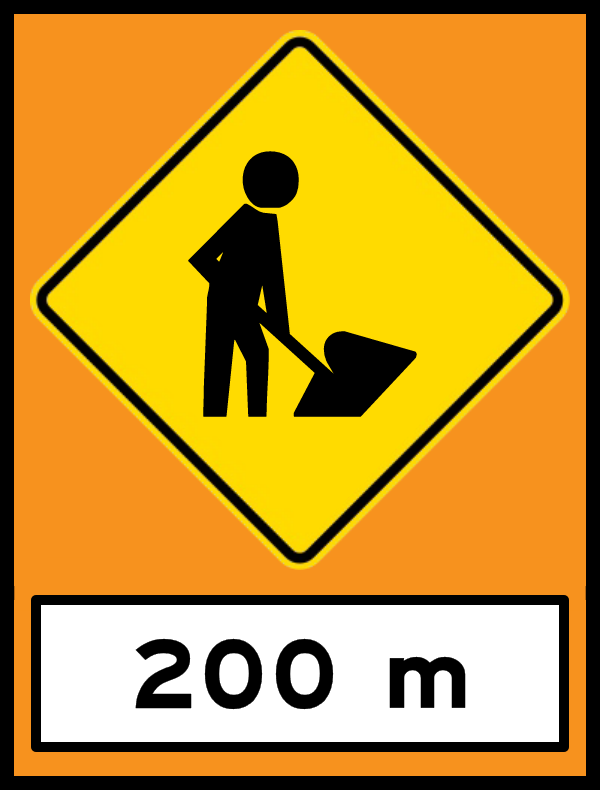
Construction works ahead in 200m

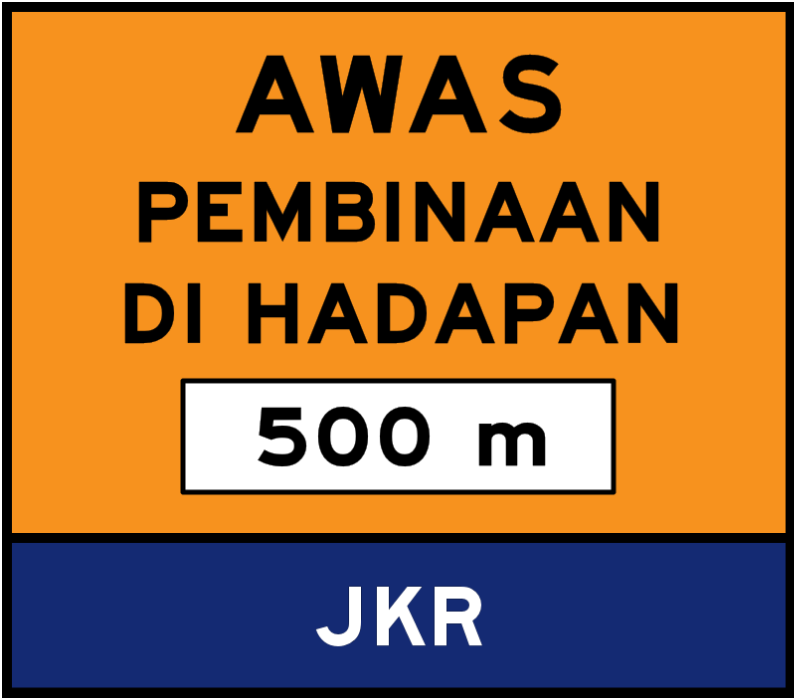
Construction works ahead in 500 m with contractor company name

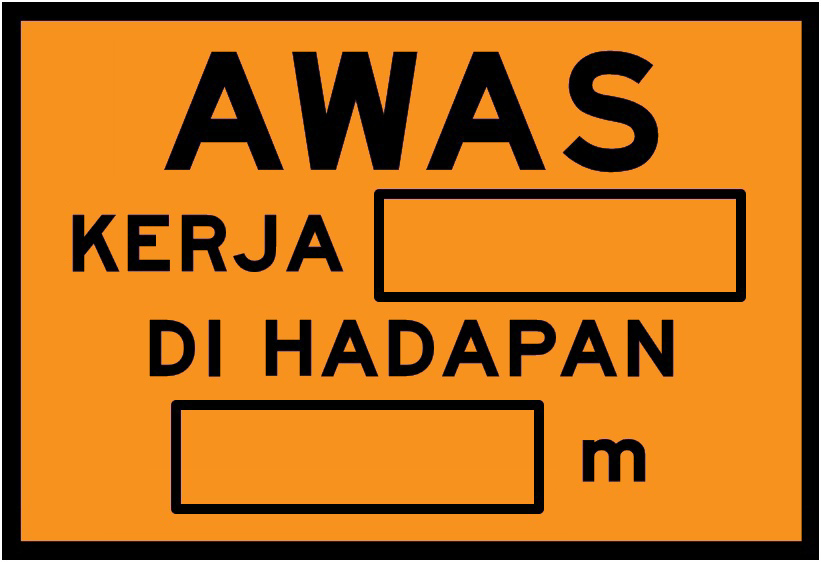
Caution. Construction works ahead (with blank space provided to specify what works is being done in how many metres)

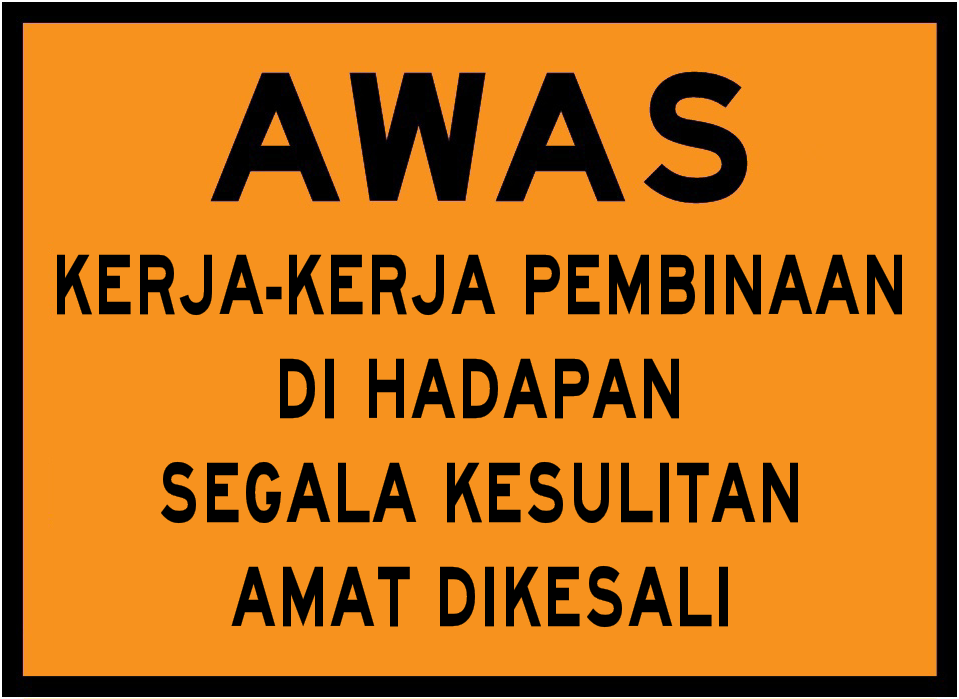
Caution construction works ahead. We apologize for any inconvenience caused.

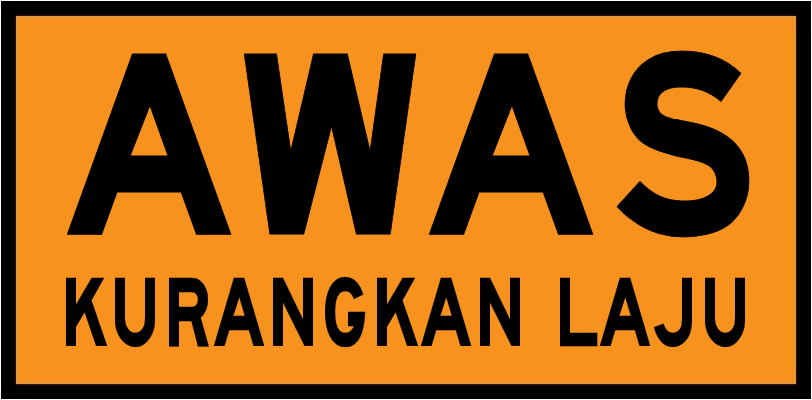
Caution, Reduce Speed

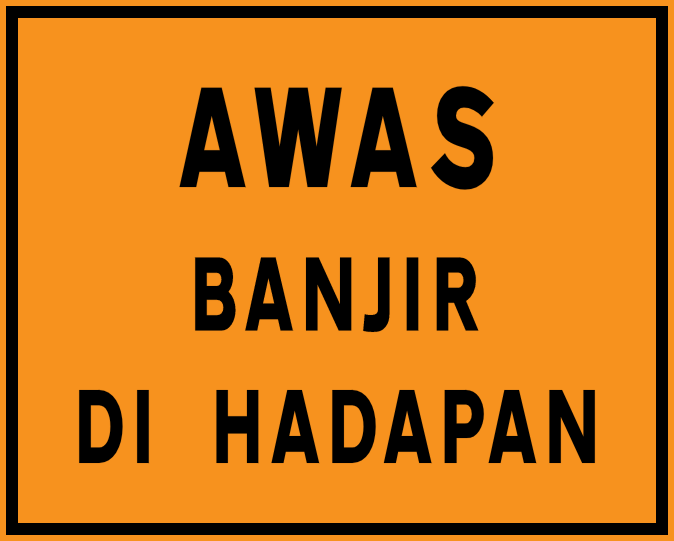
Caution, Flood Area

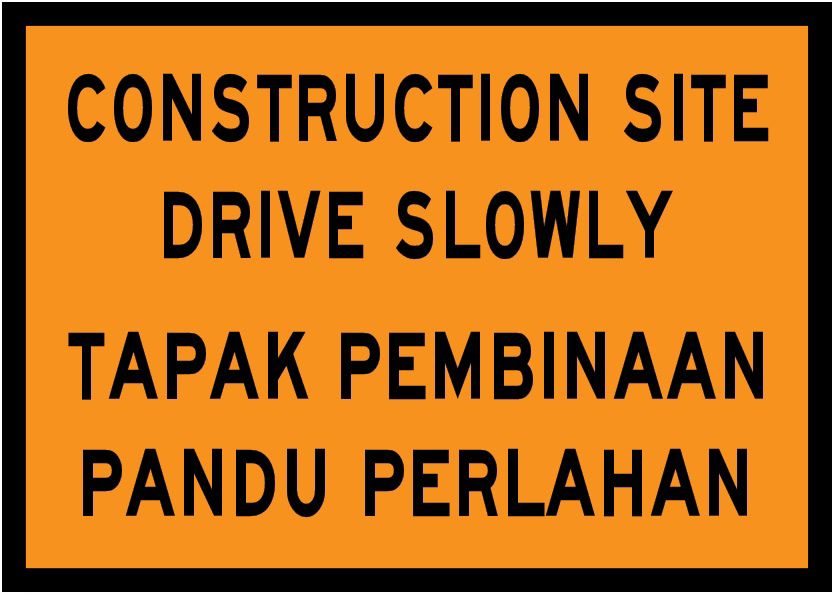
Construction site drive slowly

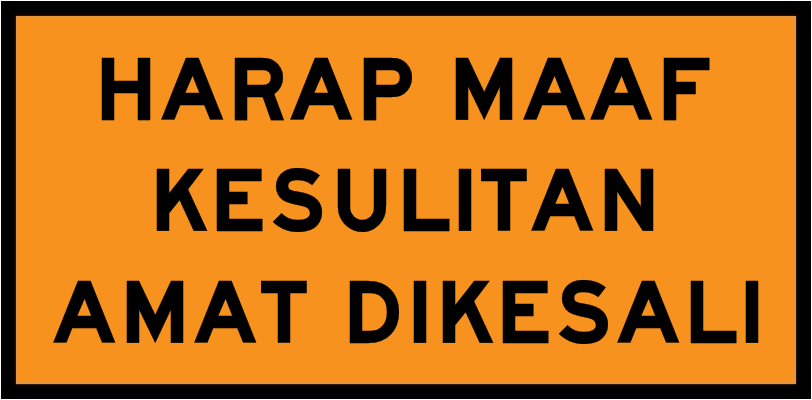
We apologize for inconvenience caused

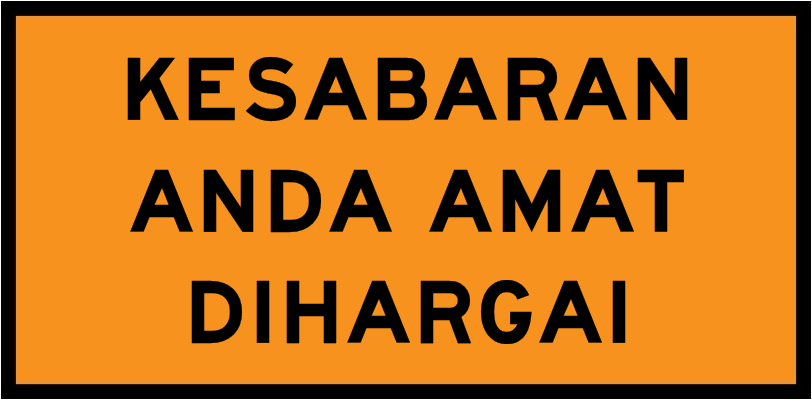
Your cooperation and patience is very appreciated

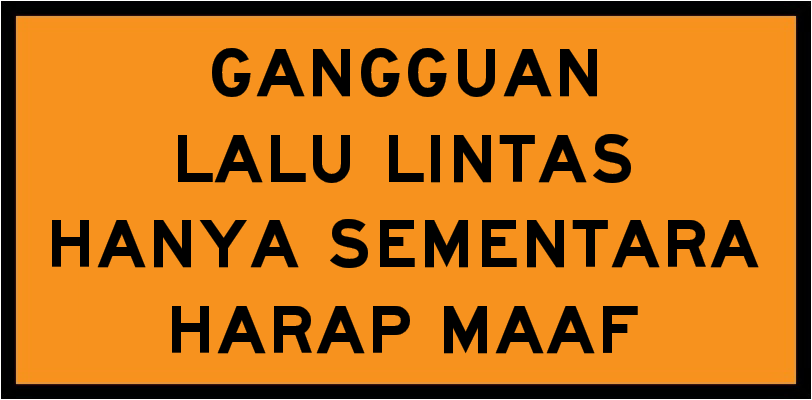
Traffic blockage is only temporary

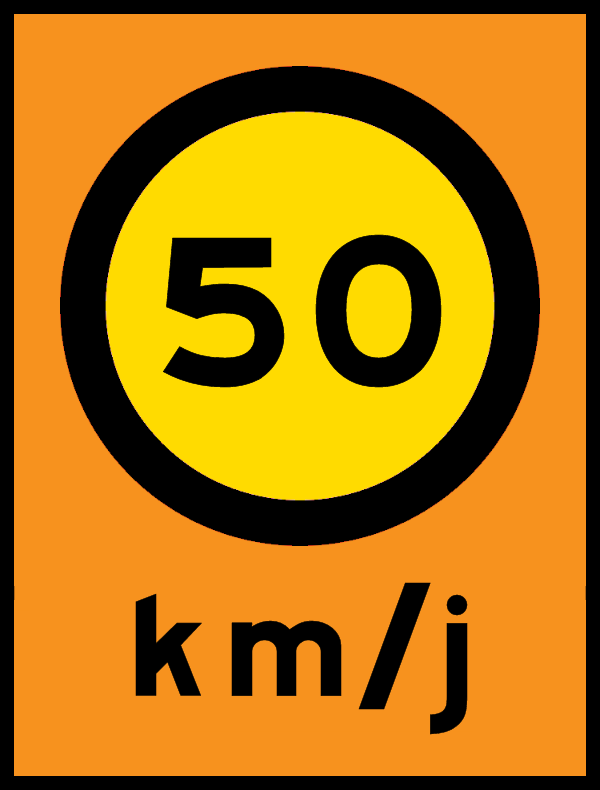
Temporary speed limit sign

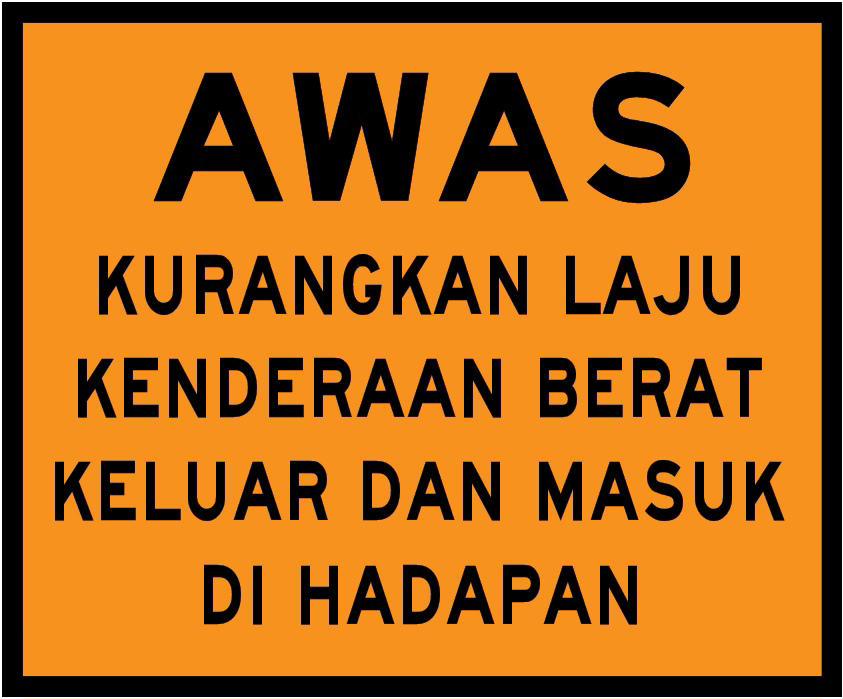
Caution heavy vehicles entering and exiting construction zone ahead

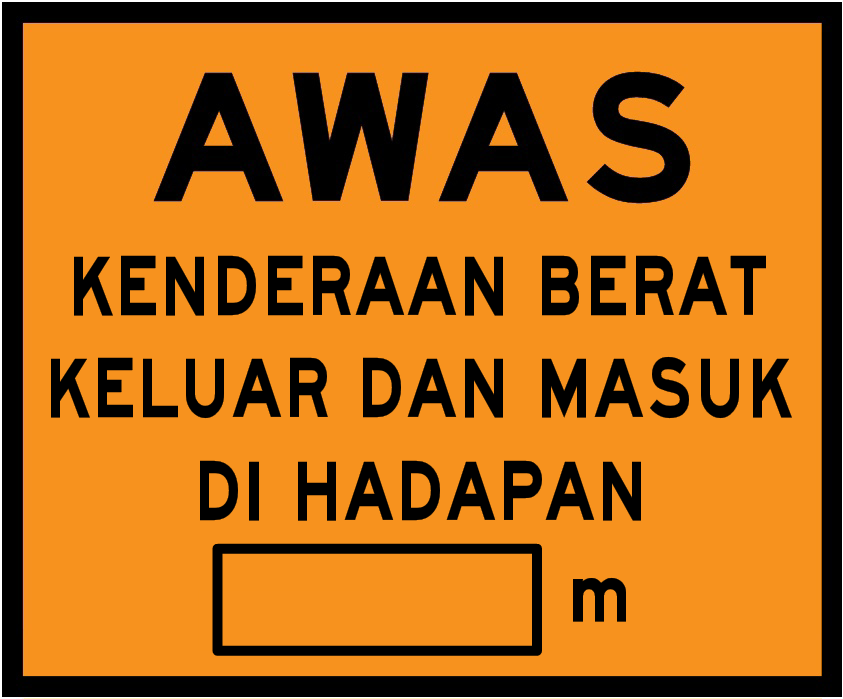
Caution heavy vehicles entering and exiting construction zone ahead, with distance

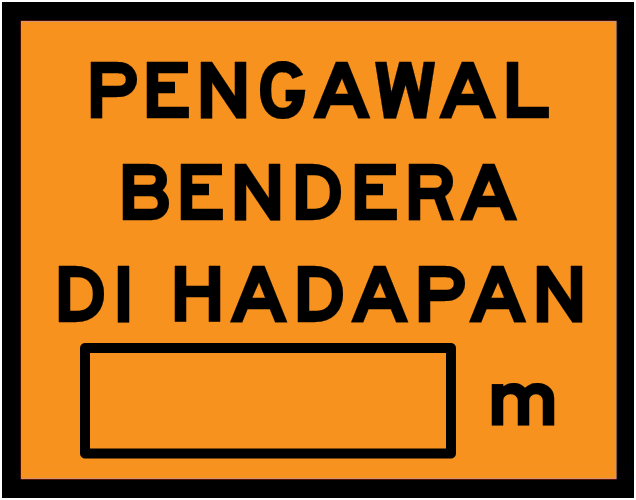
Flagman ahead with distance

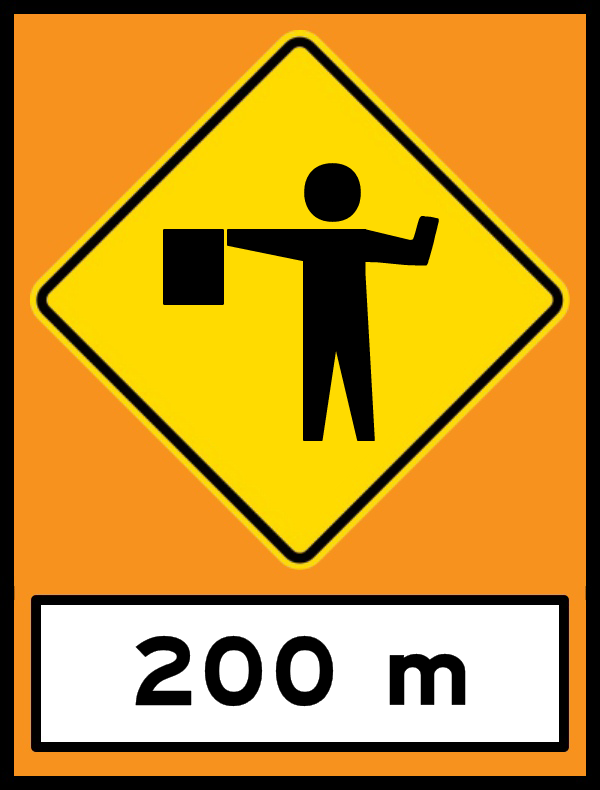
Flagman ahead in 200m

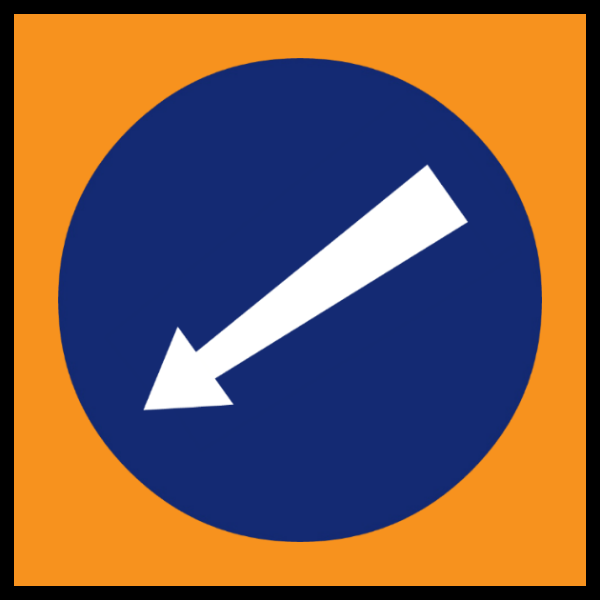
Pass onto the left

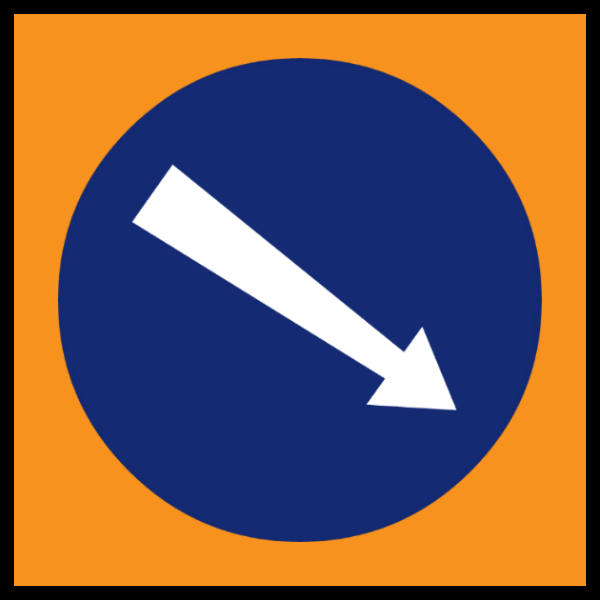
Pass onto the right

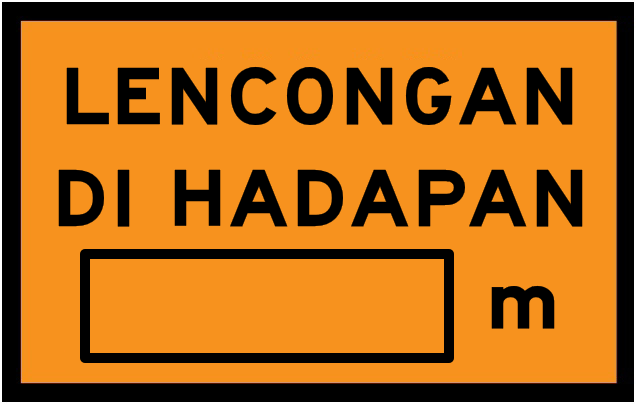
Detour ahead with distance

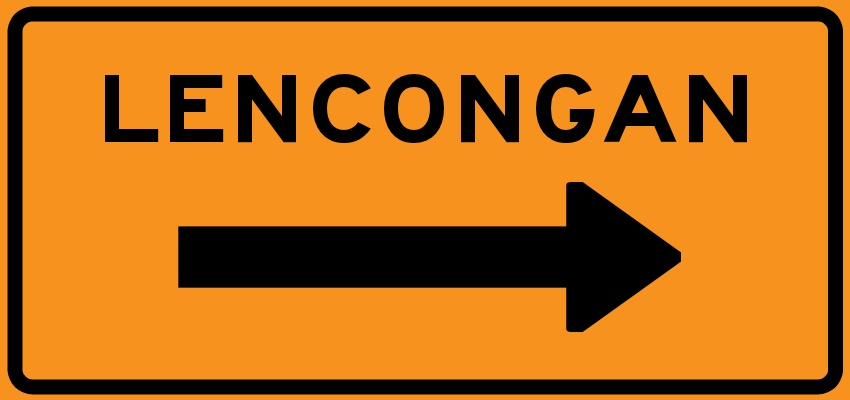
Detour, follow arrow

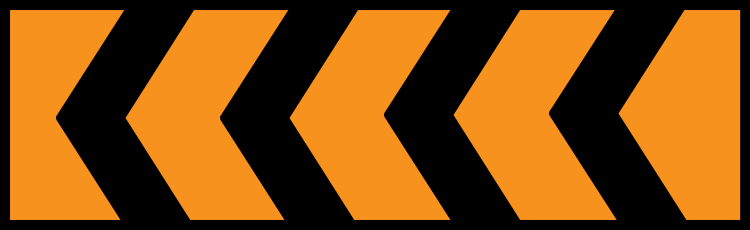
Detour to the left sign

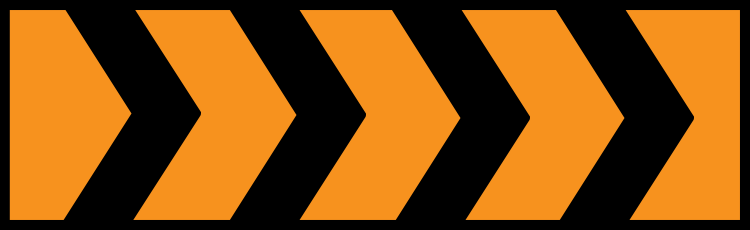
Detour to the right sign

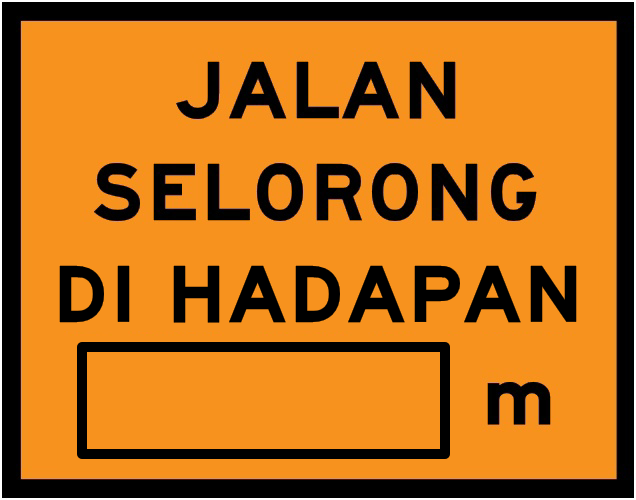
One lane road ahead

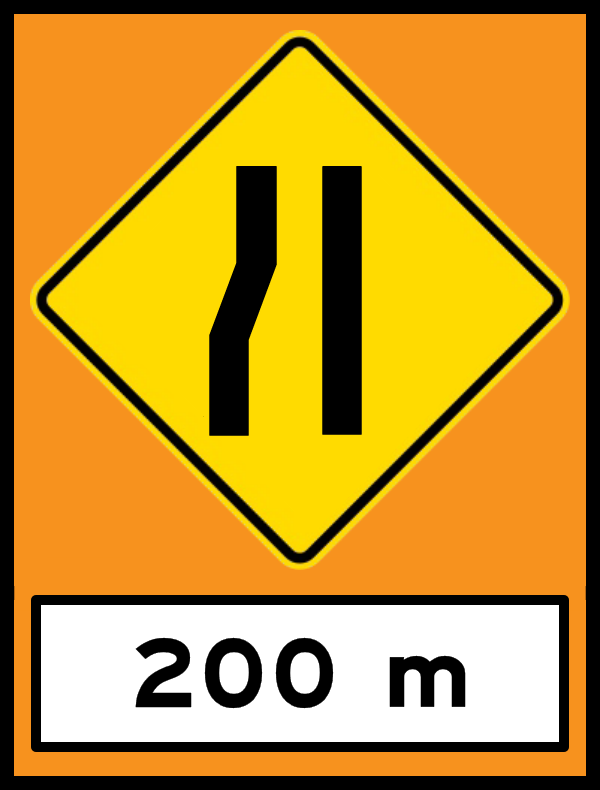
Temporary narrow roads on the left in 200 metres

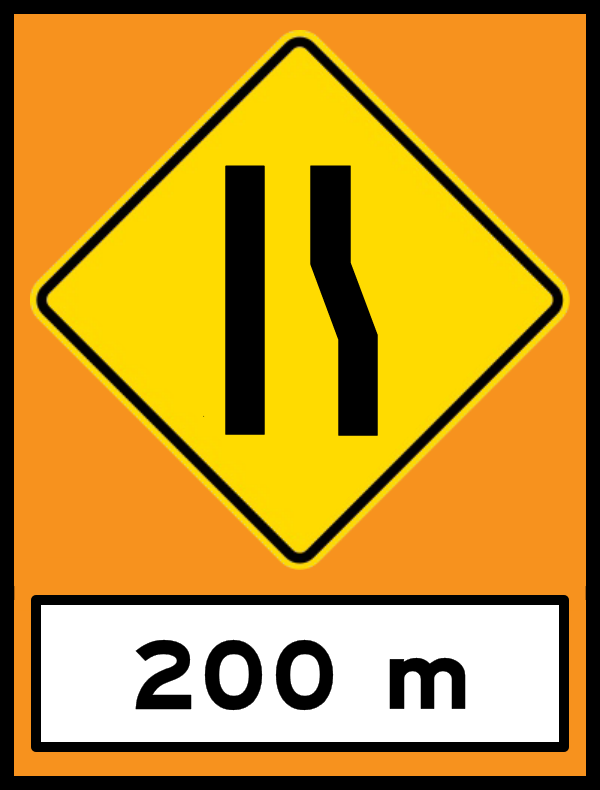
Temporary narrow roads on the right in 200 metres

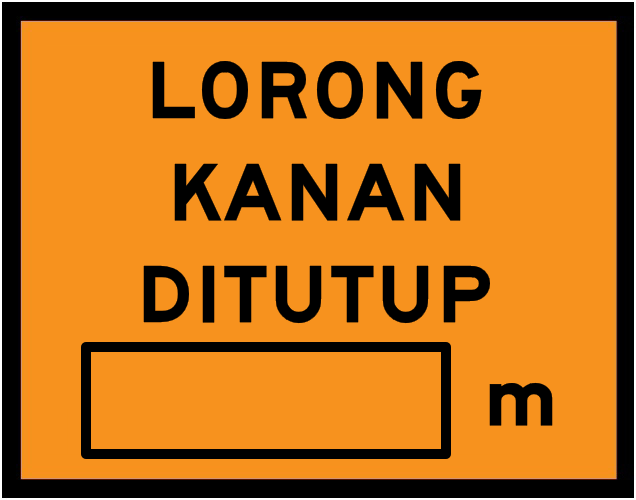
Right lane closed

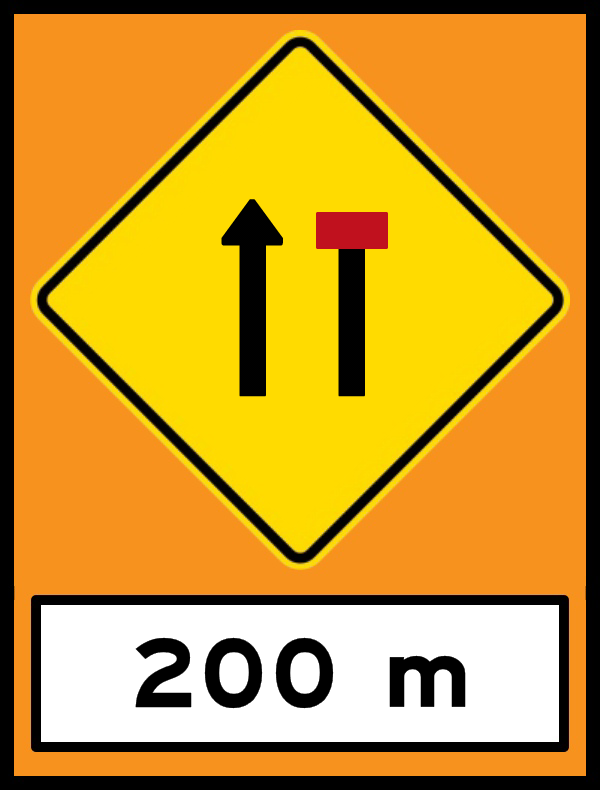
Right lane closed

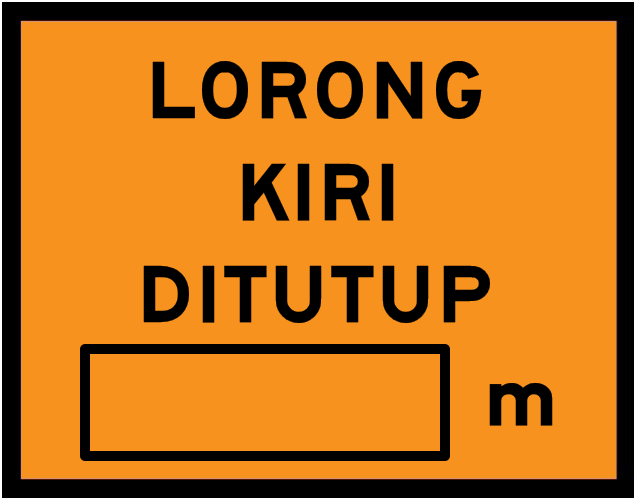
Left lane closed

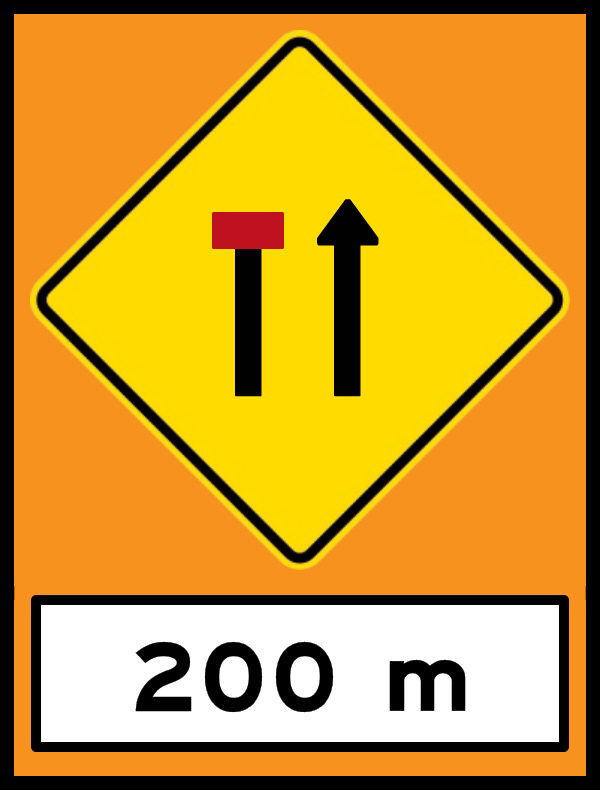
Left lane closed

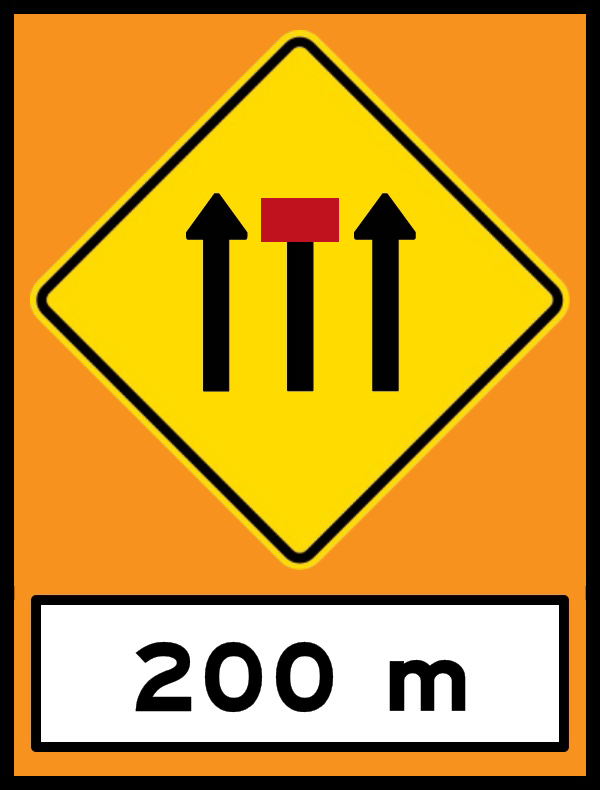
Middle lane closed

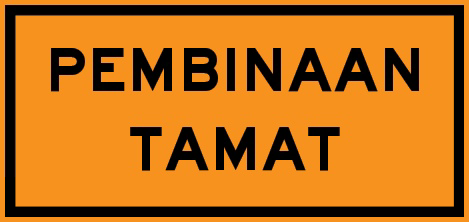
End of construction (option 1)

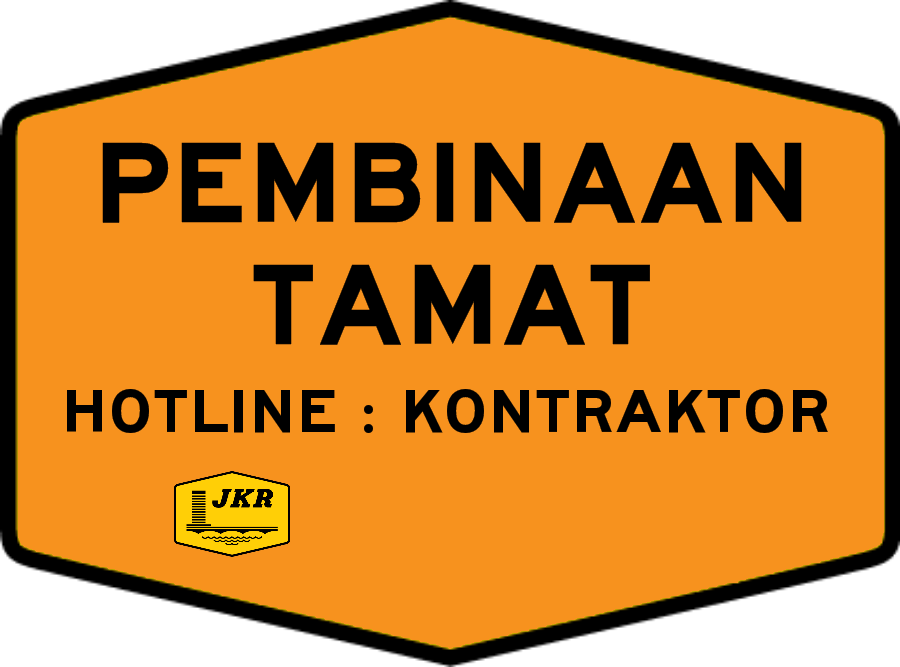
End of construction (option 2)

== Information signs ==
Malaysian information signs are blue.

First aid/hospital sign (Option 1)

Hospital sign (Option 2)

No through road

U-turn

P-turn

Layby logo

Rest and Service Area (found at toll expressways)

Rest and Service Area (found at non-tolled highways/major trunk roads)

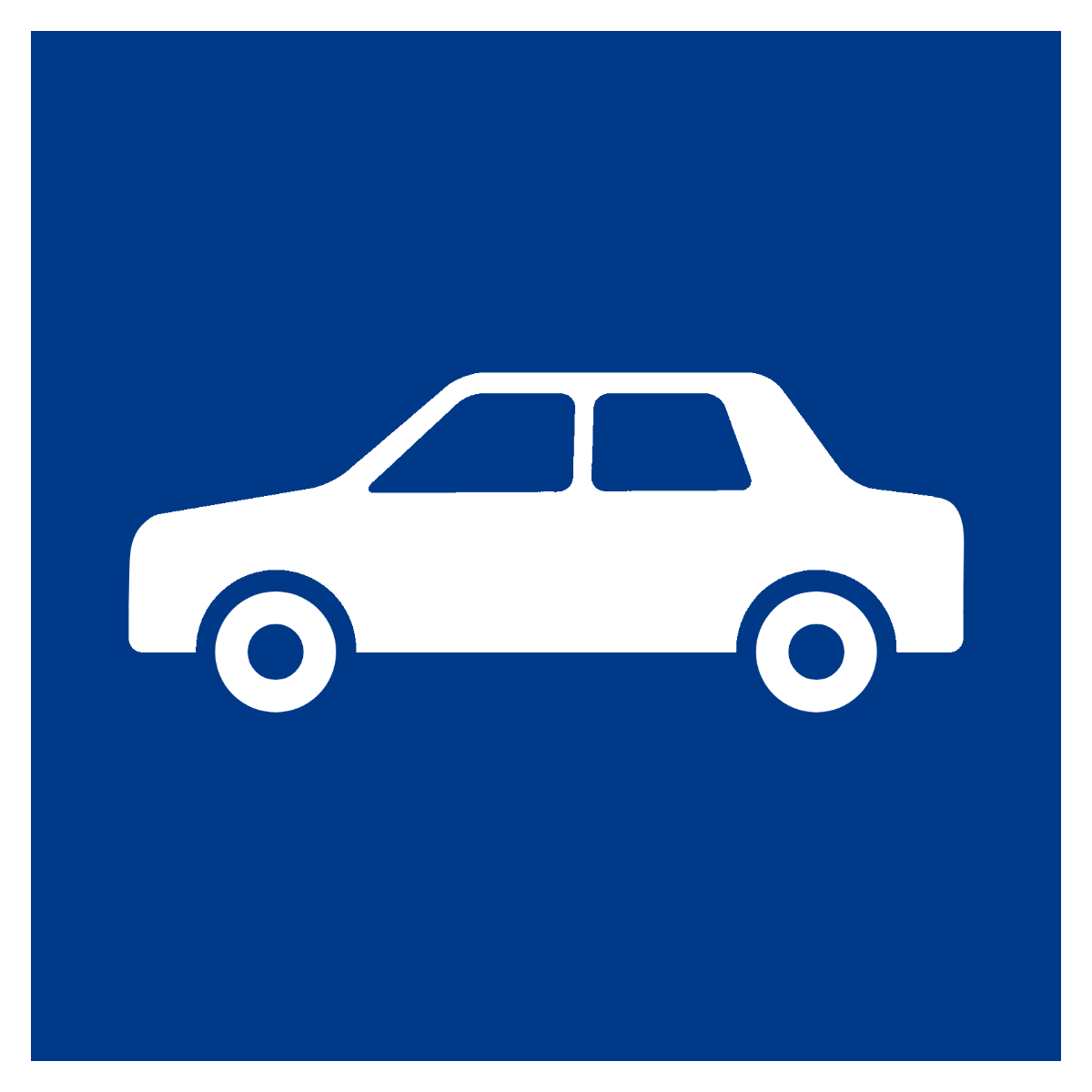
Car stop

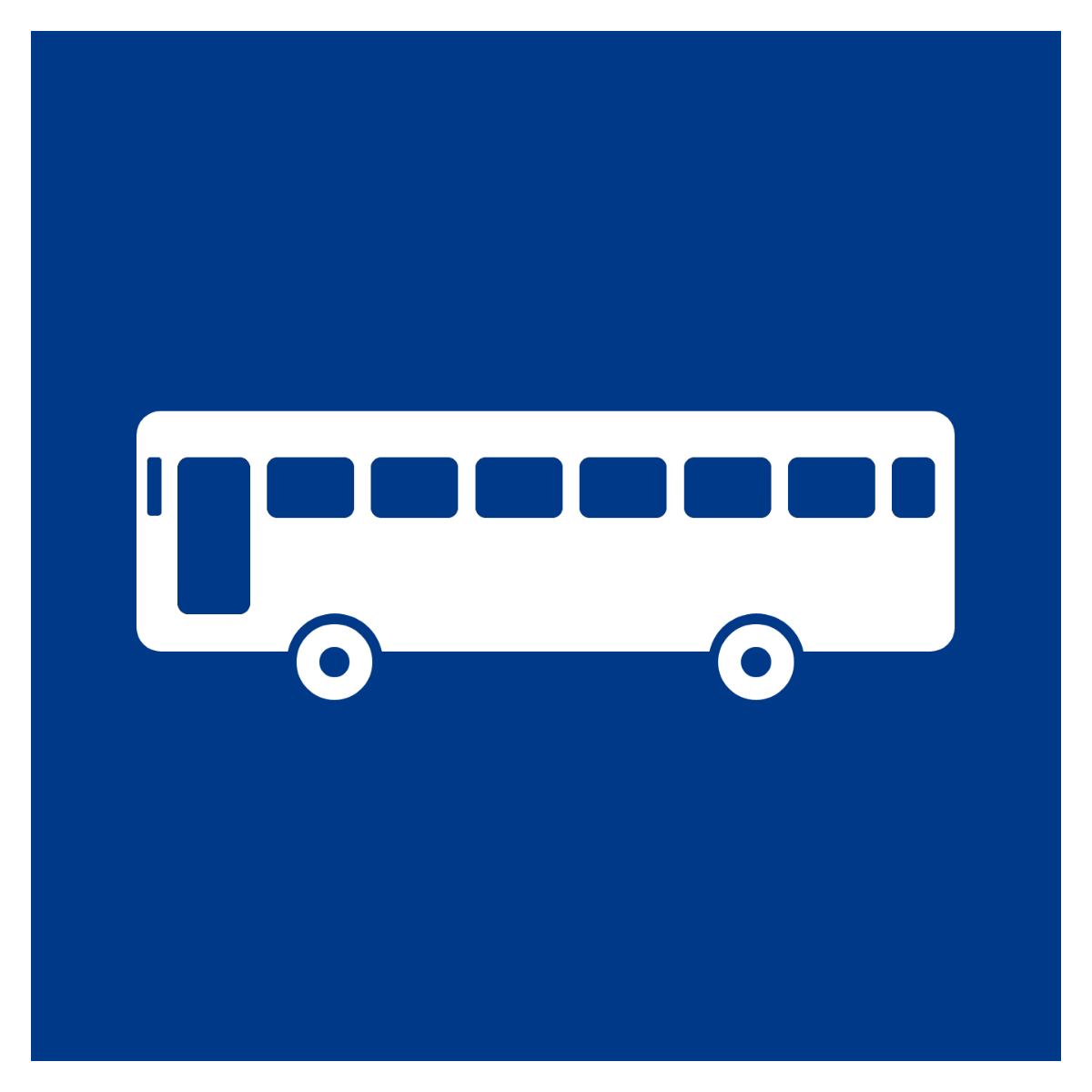
Bus stop (at Lay-by or Rest and Service Area)

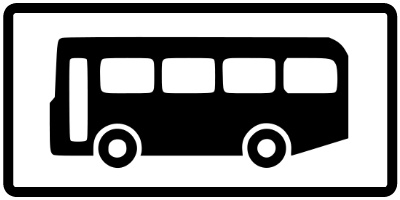
Bus Stop

Truck stop

Restaurant / food court

Disabled (OKU) parking

Toilet

Petrol Station

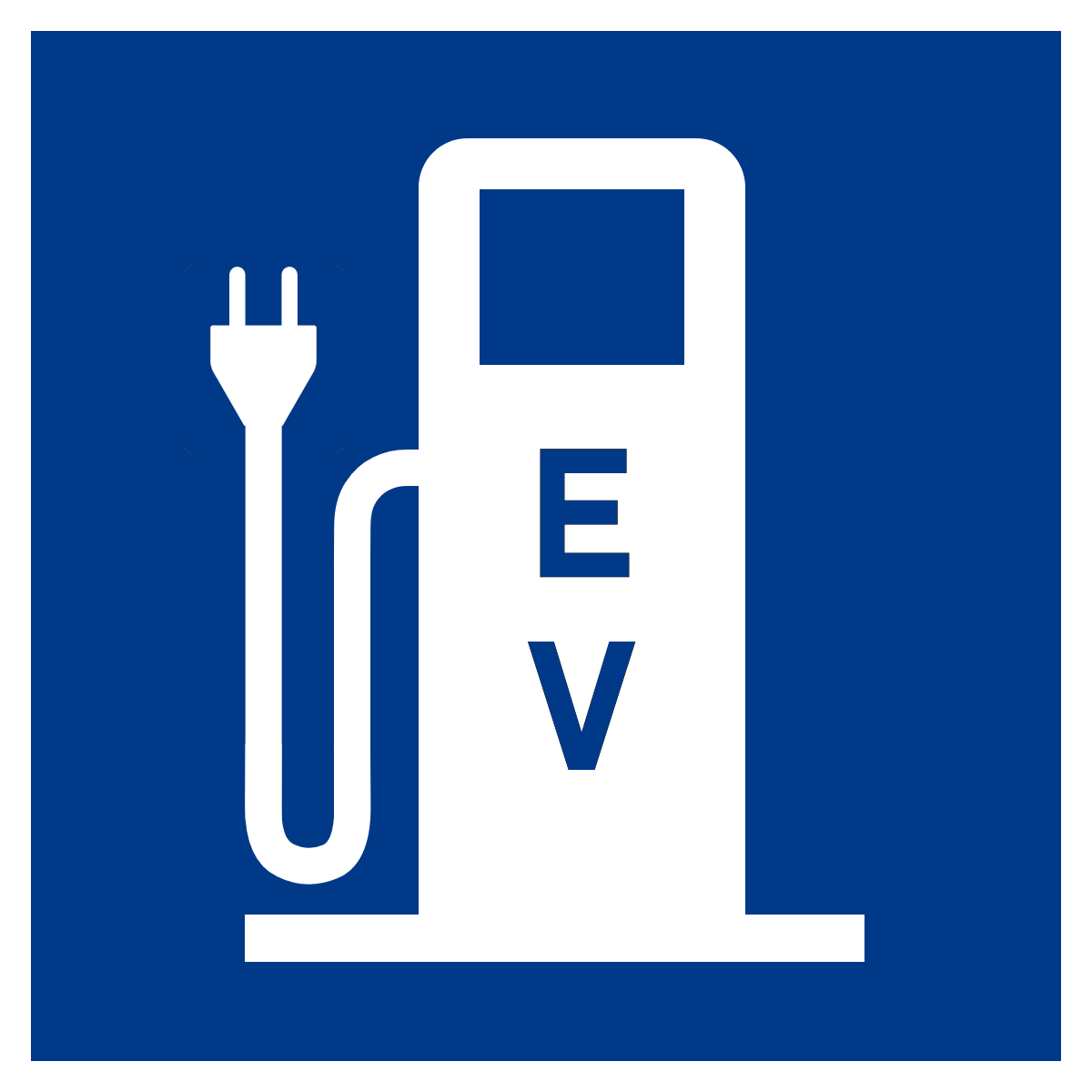
Electric vehicle (EV) charging station

Muslim prayer room (Surau) / Mosque

Jetty

Pier

Emergency Telephone

Parking

Wakaf (hut)

Foodtruck Area

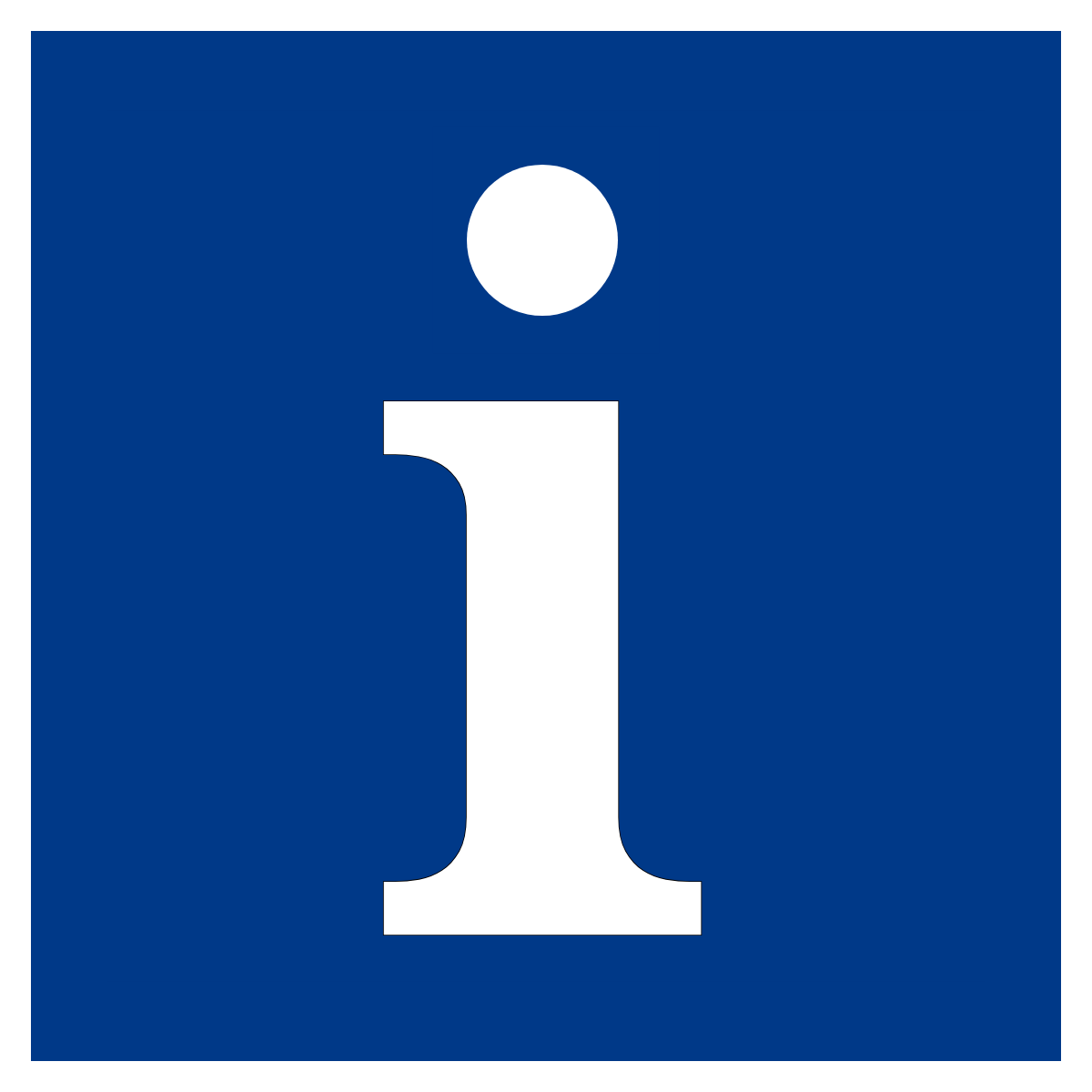
Information Centre

Repair shop

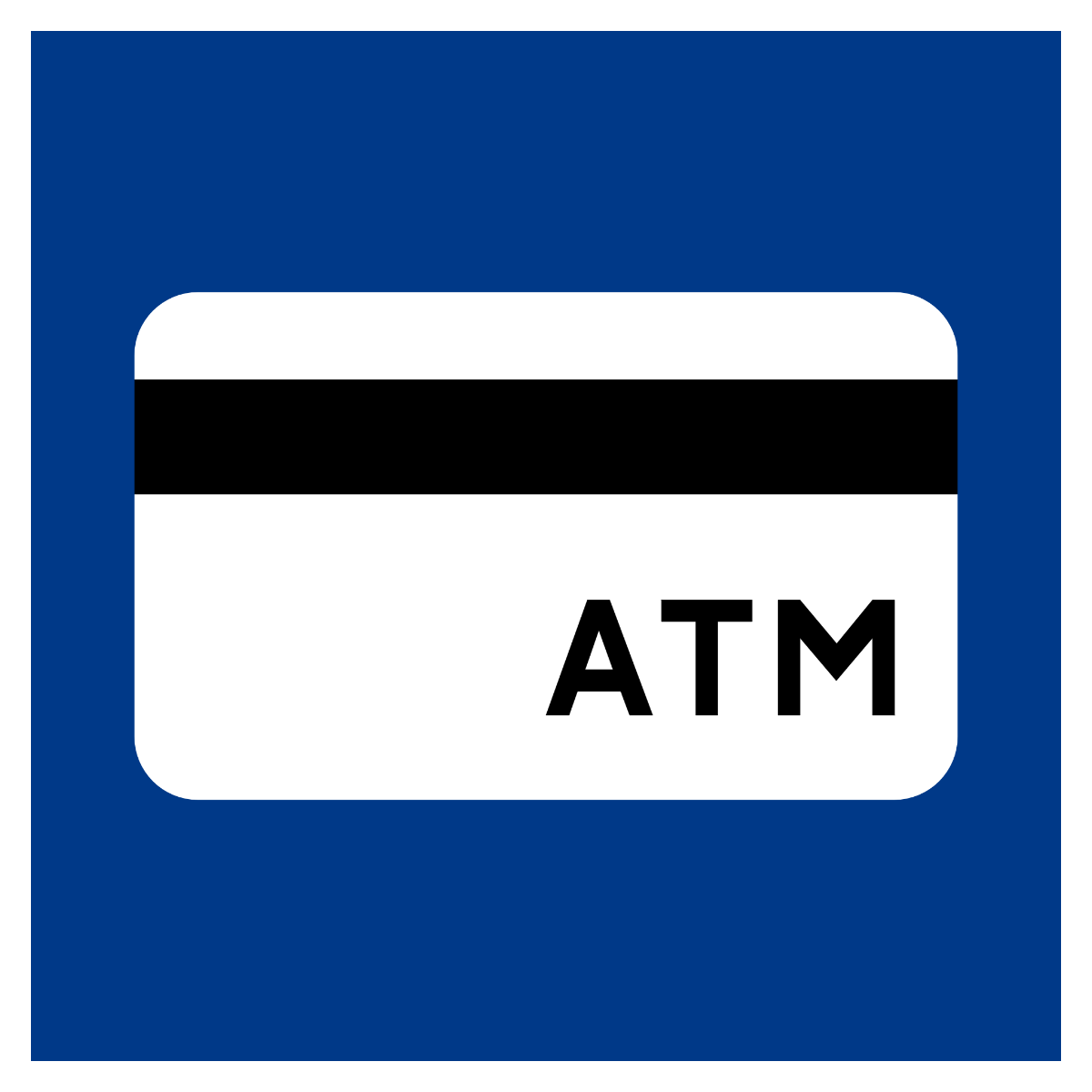
ATM facilities

Touch 'n Go purchase and reload facilities

Money Changer

Wi-Fi Hotspot

International airport

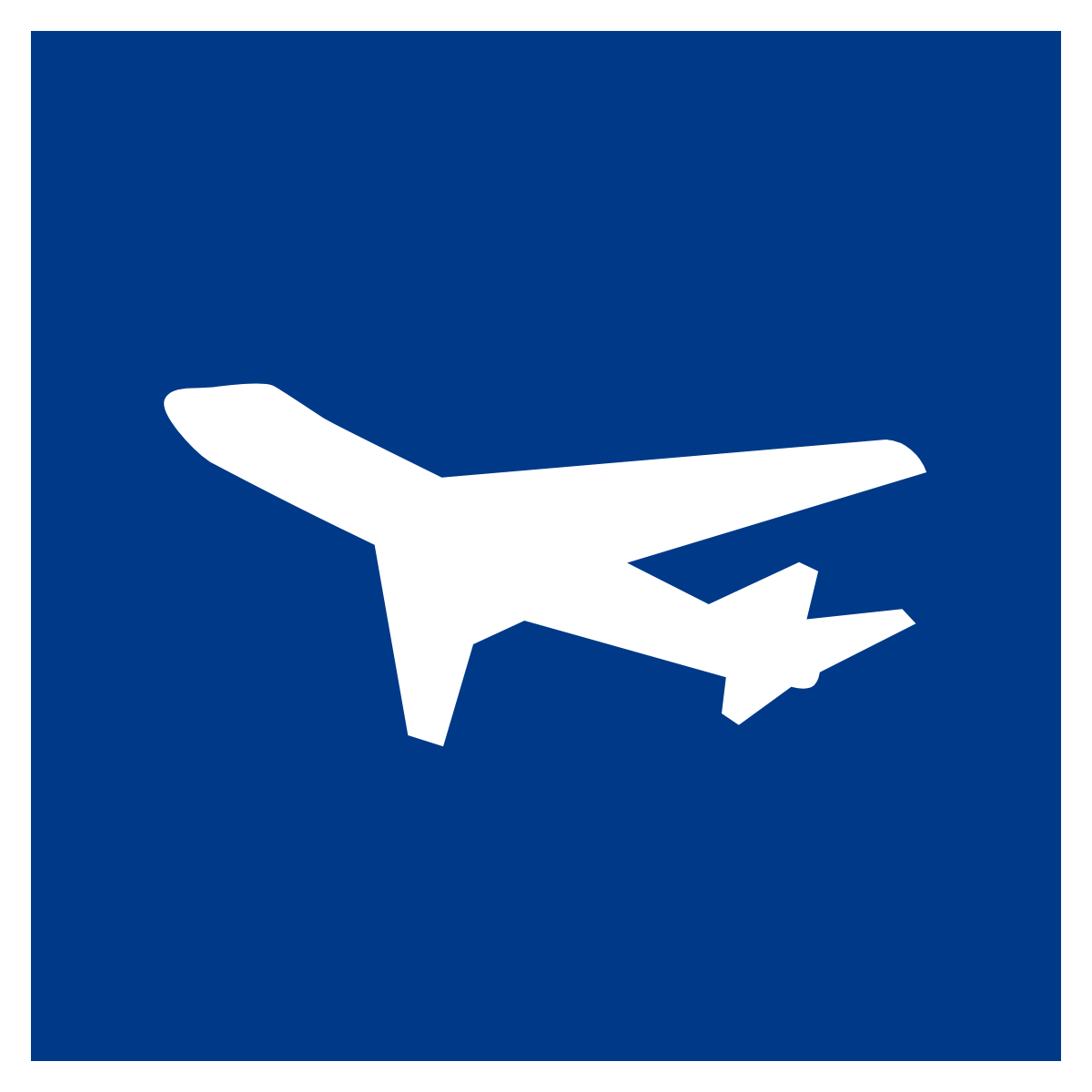
Domestic airport

University

== Directional and distance signs ==
=== Motorcycle lane ===
Malaysian motorcycle lane signs are blue.

Motorcycle lane entrance

Motorcycle lane gantry sign

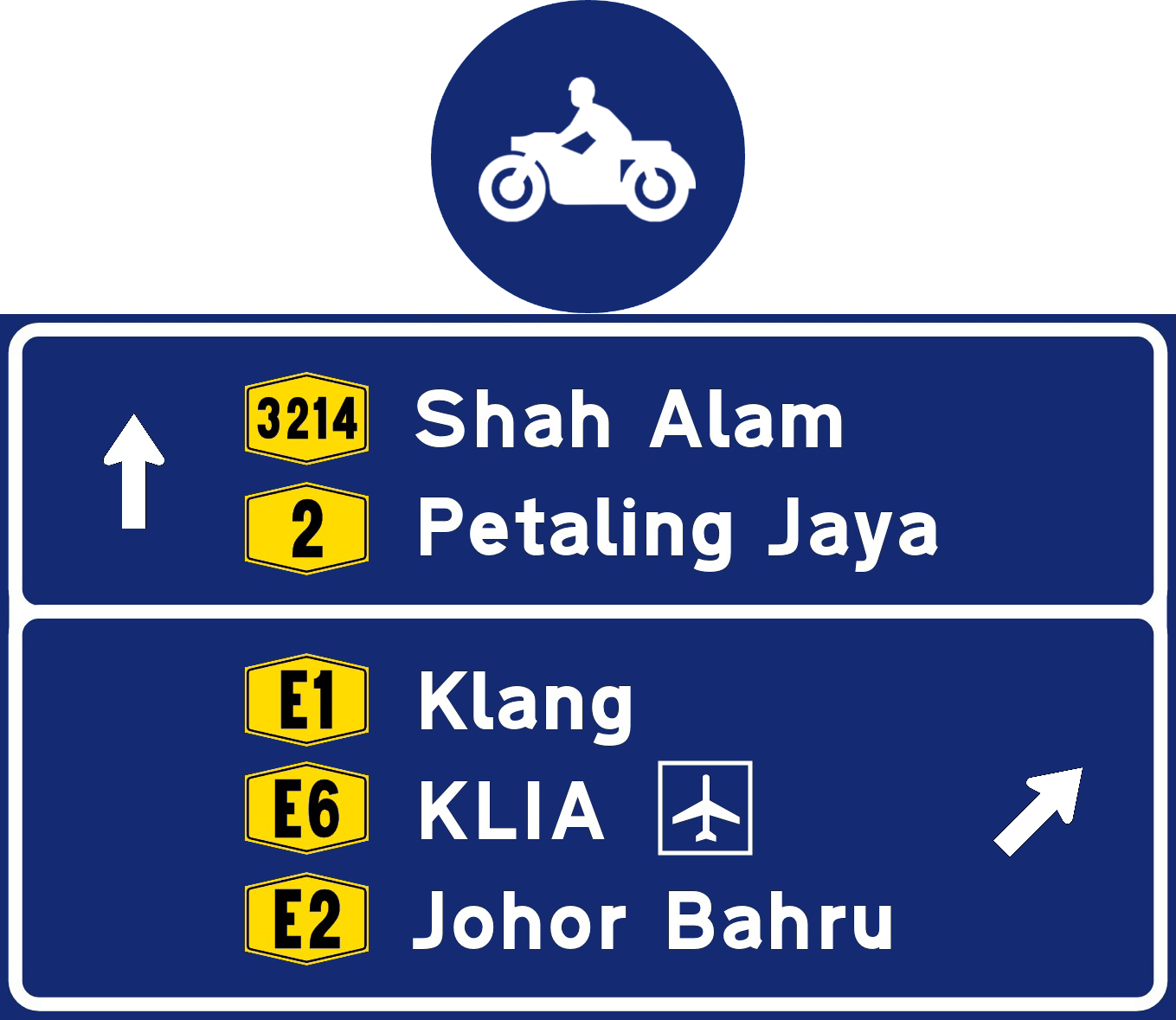
Motorcycle lane directions sign

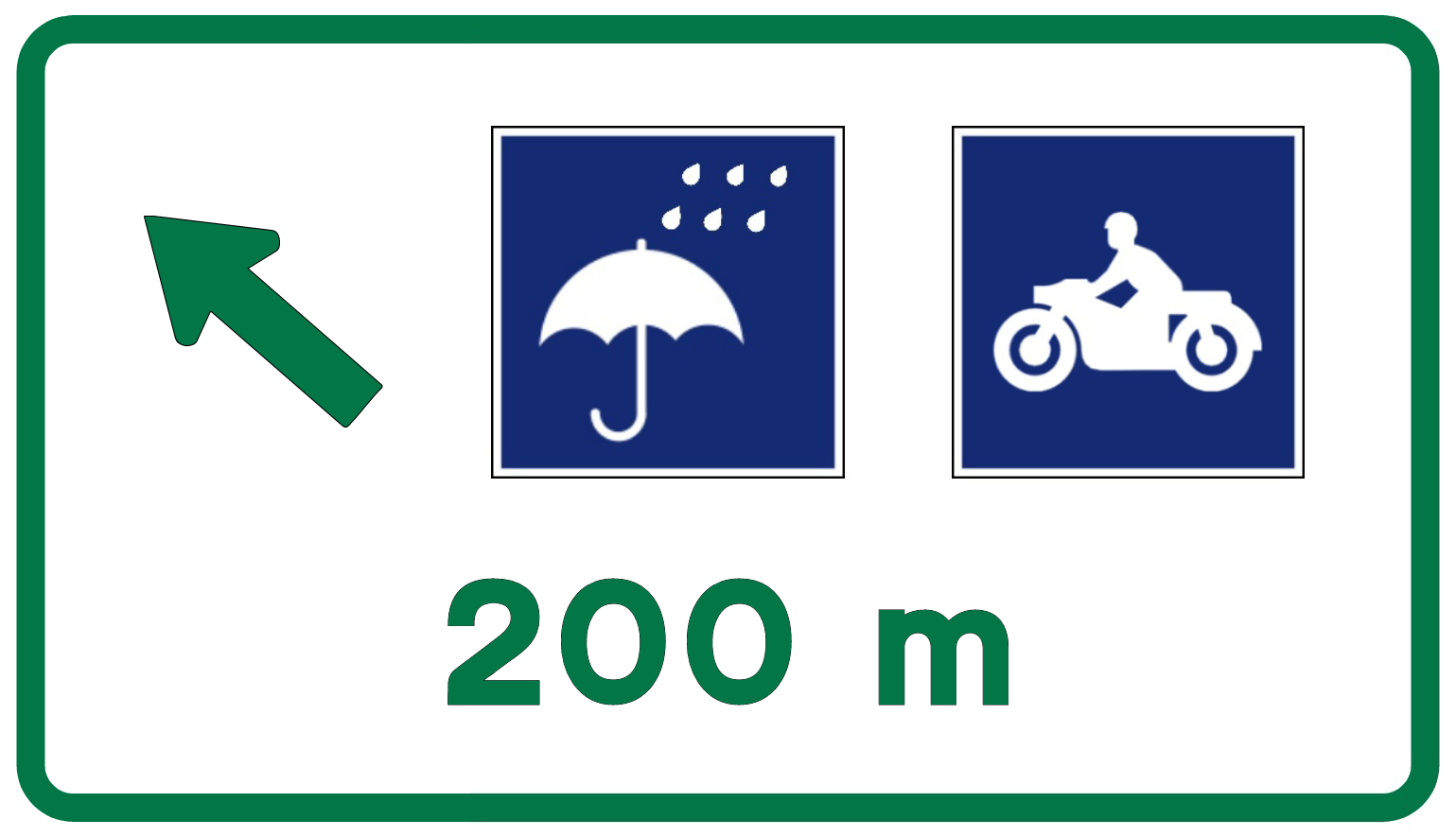
Rain shelter for motorcycles, 200 metres ahead

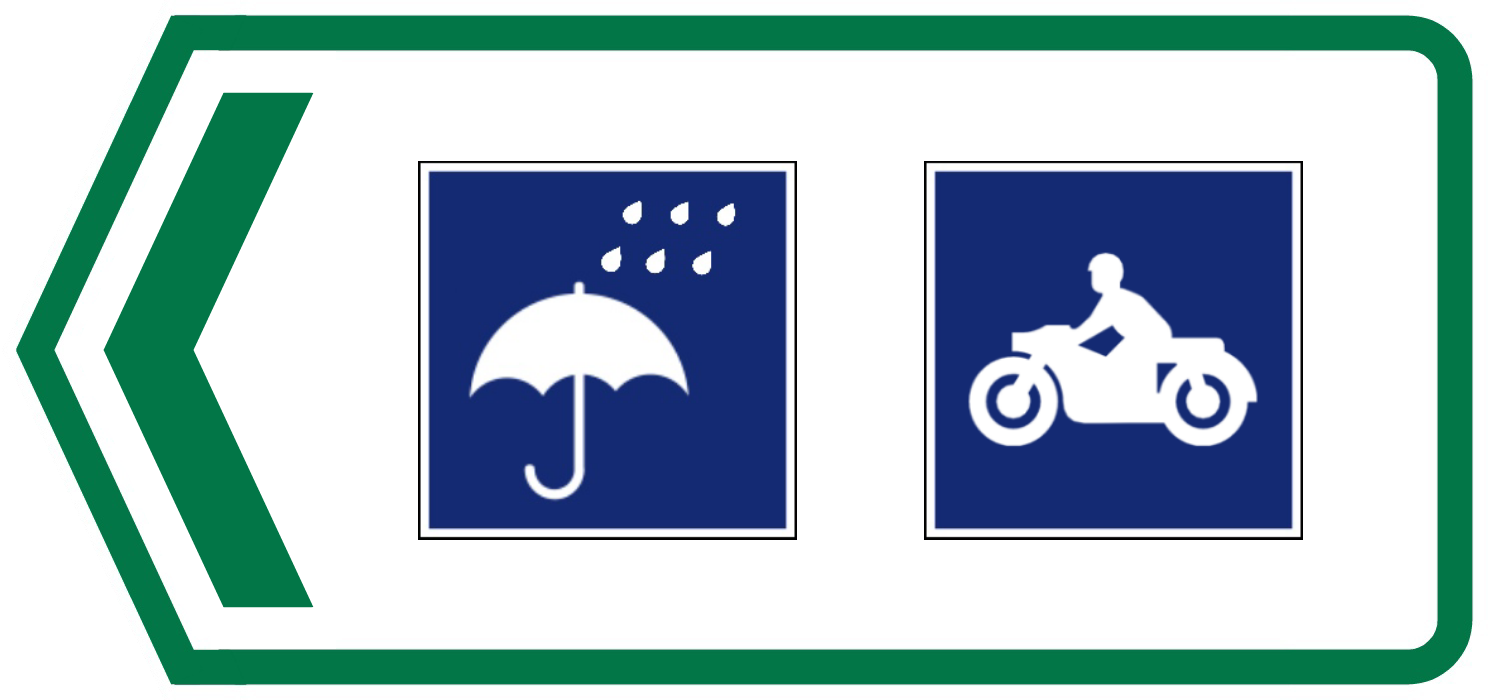
Rain shelter for motorcycles pull-in

=== Expressway signs ===
Expressway signs have a green background. If the sign is not located on an expressway but is leading to one, it will have a blue background with green box in it.

Symbol of the Malaysian Expressways

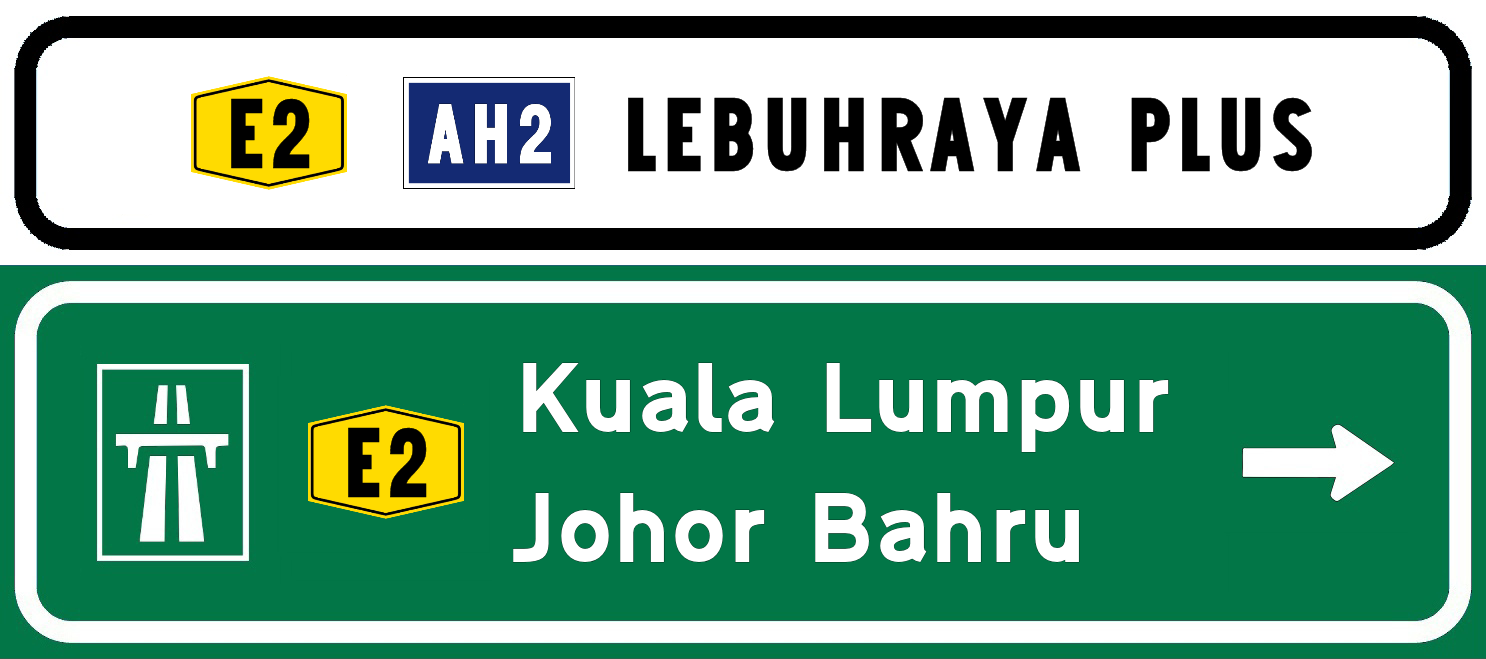
Direction to expressway with expressway name

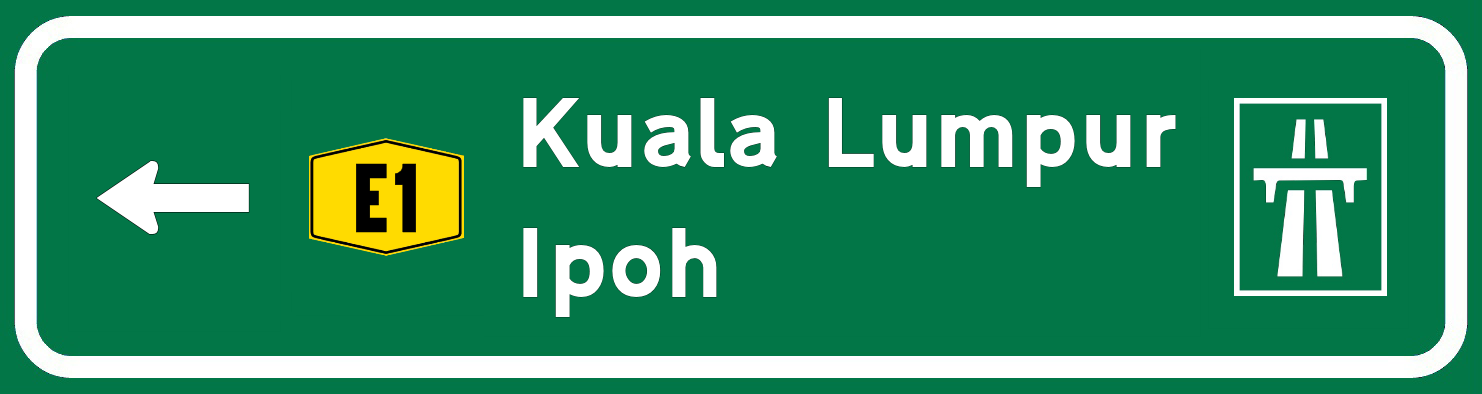
Direction to expressway

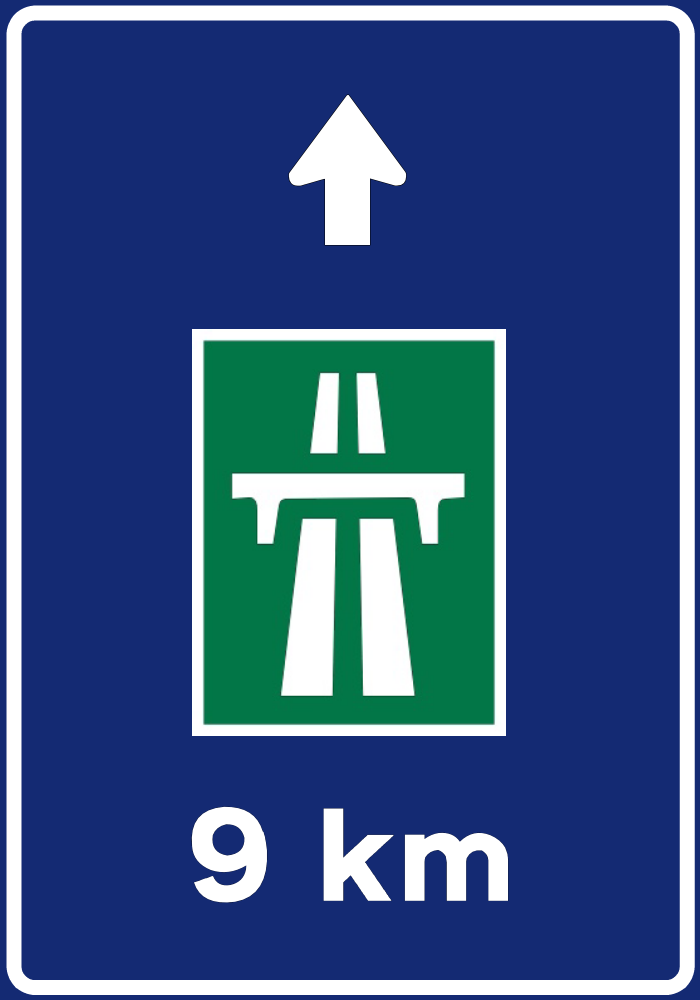
To expressway direction

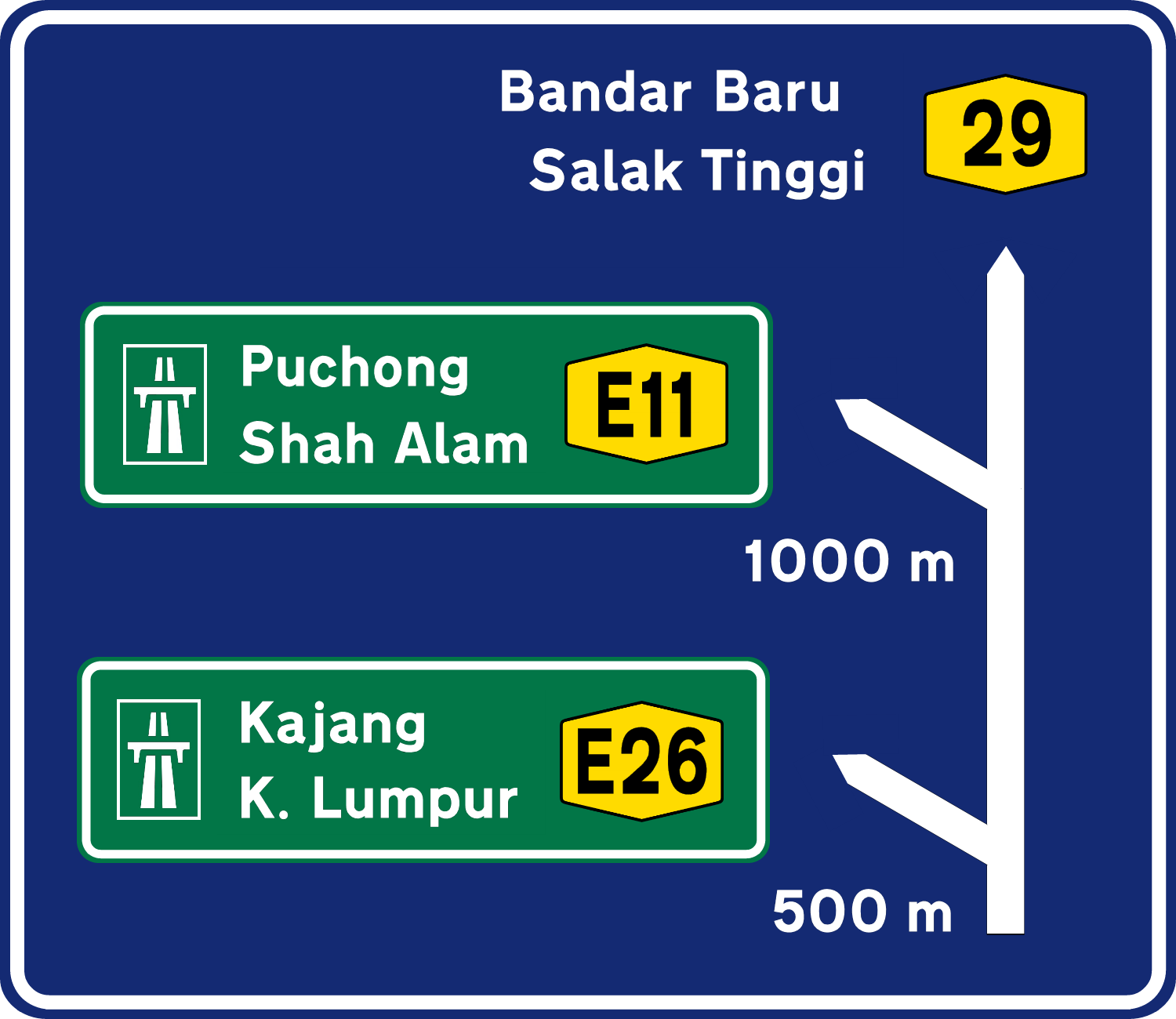
Entrance to the toll expressway from non-tolled highway

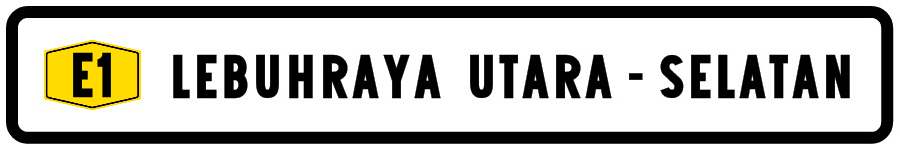
White with black letters signs for expressway names of closed toll systems

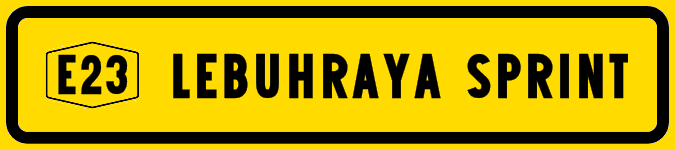
Yellow with black letters signs for expressway names of opened toll systems

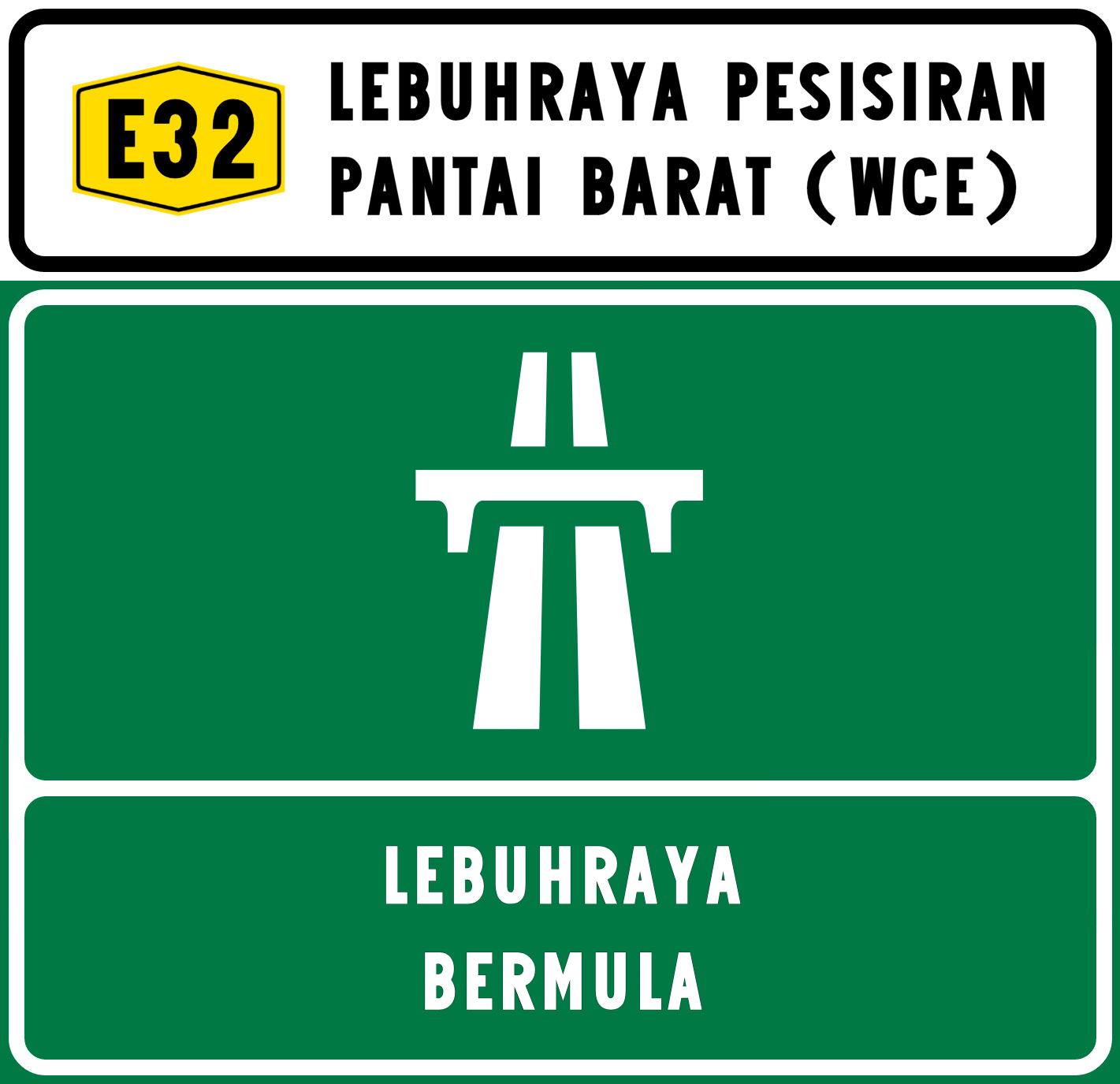
Start of Expressway with road name and route code (Option 1)

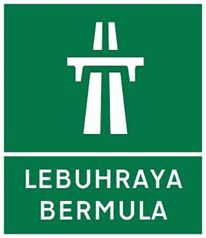
Start of Expressway (Option 2)

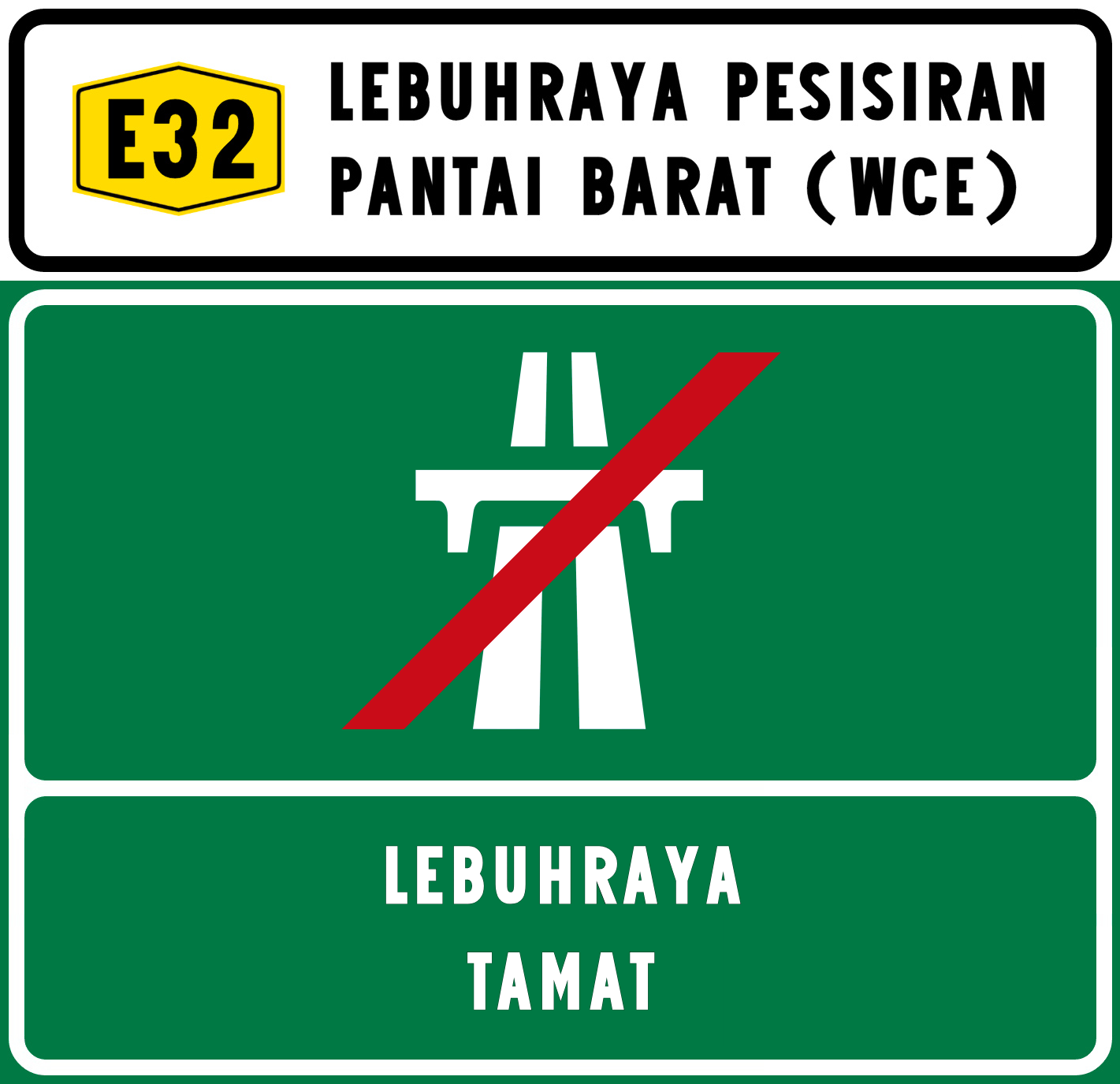
End of Expressway with road name and route code (Option 1)

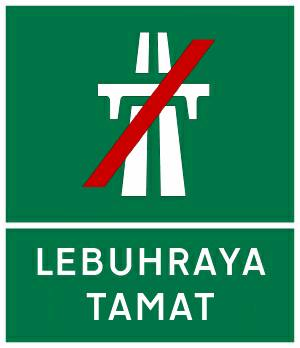
End of expressway (Option 2)

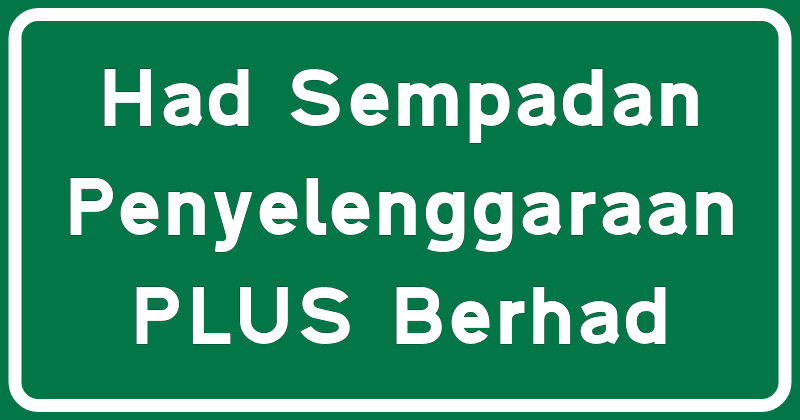
Expressway maintenance border limit (Option 1)

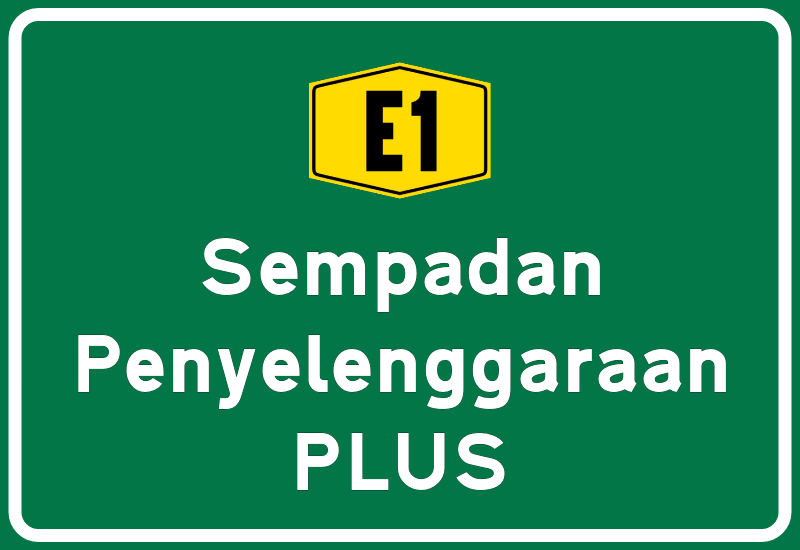
Expressway maintenance border limit (Option 2)

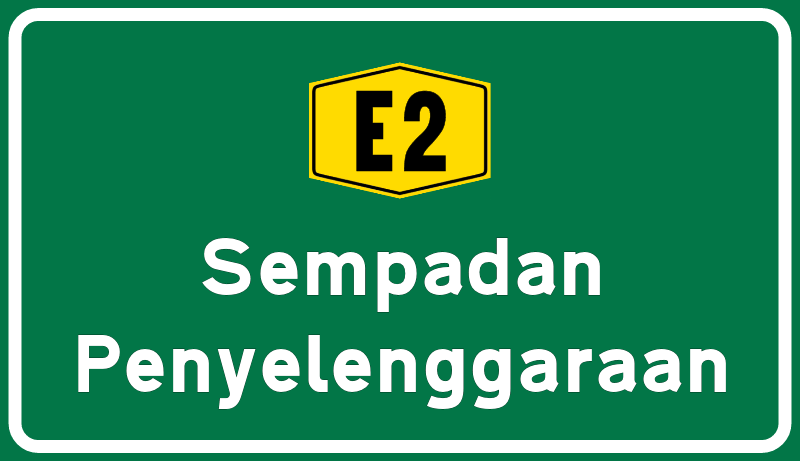
Expressway maintenance border limit (Option 3)

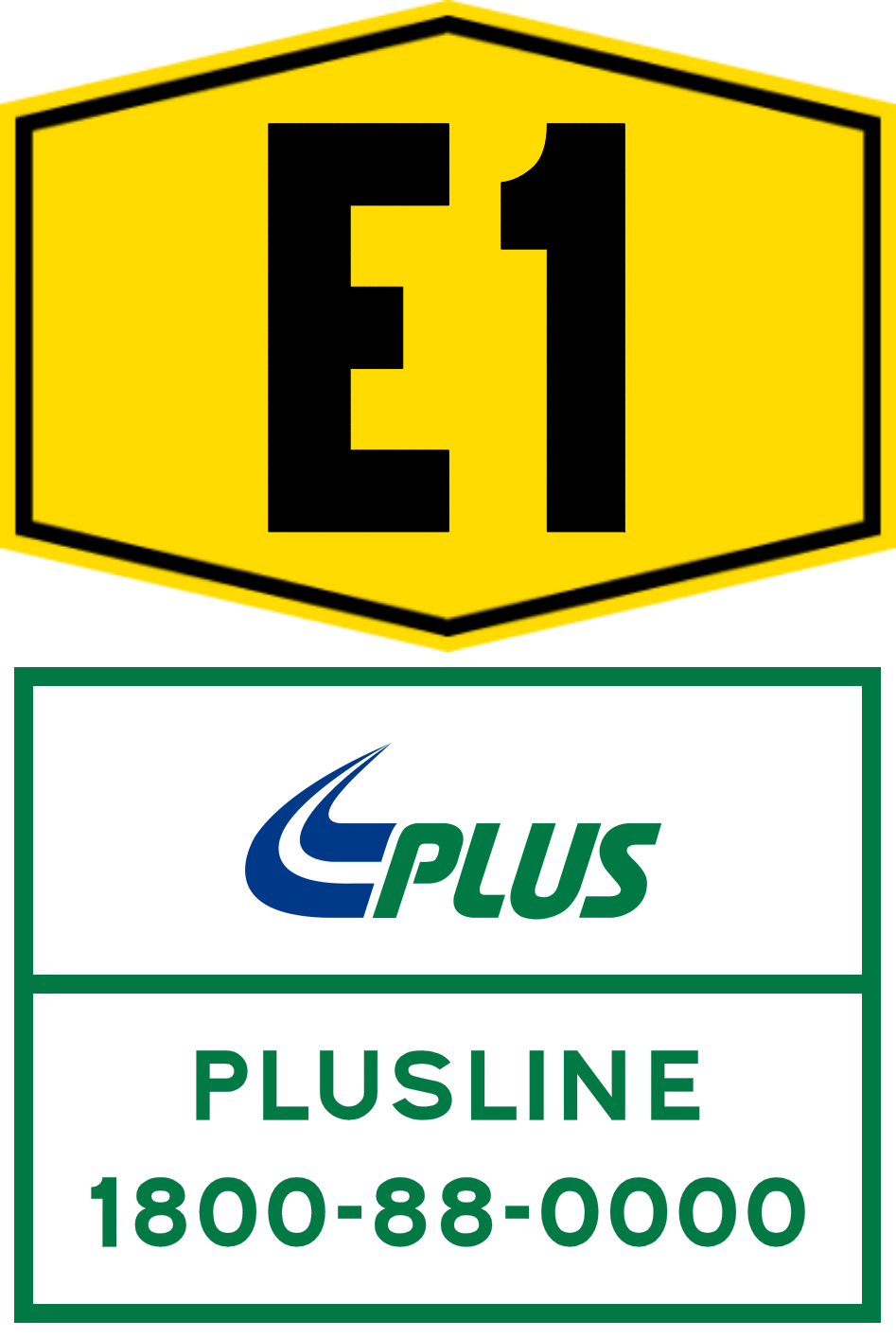
Malaysian expressway shield with highway concessionaire logo and highway hotline number

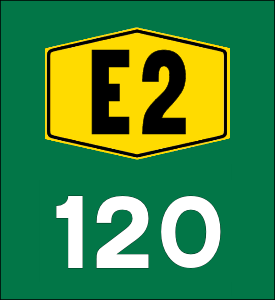
Driver location signs kilometre markers

Driver location signs hectometre markers

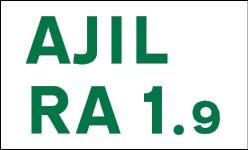
Driver location signs interchange hectometre markers

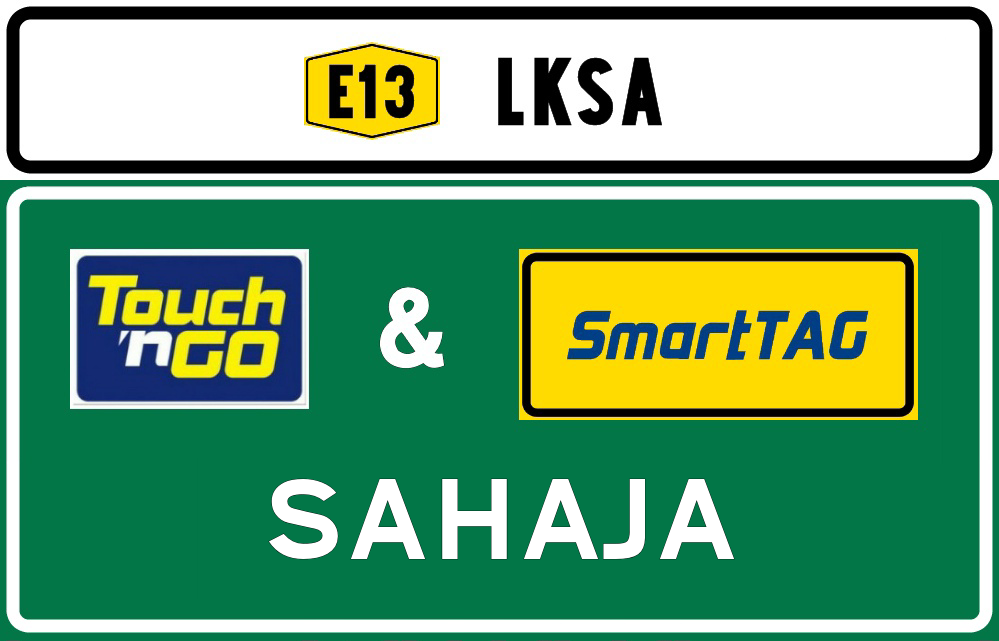
This expressway accepts electronic toll collections (ETC) only

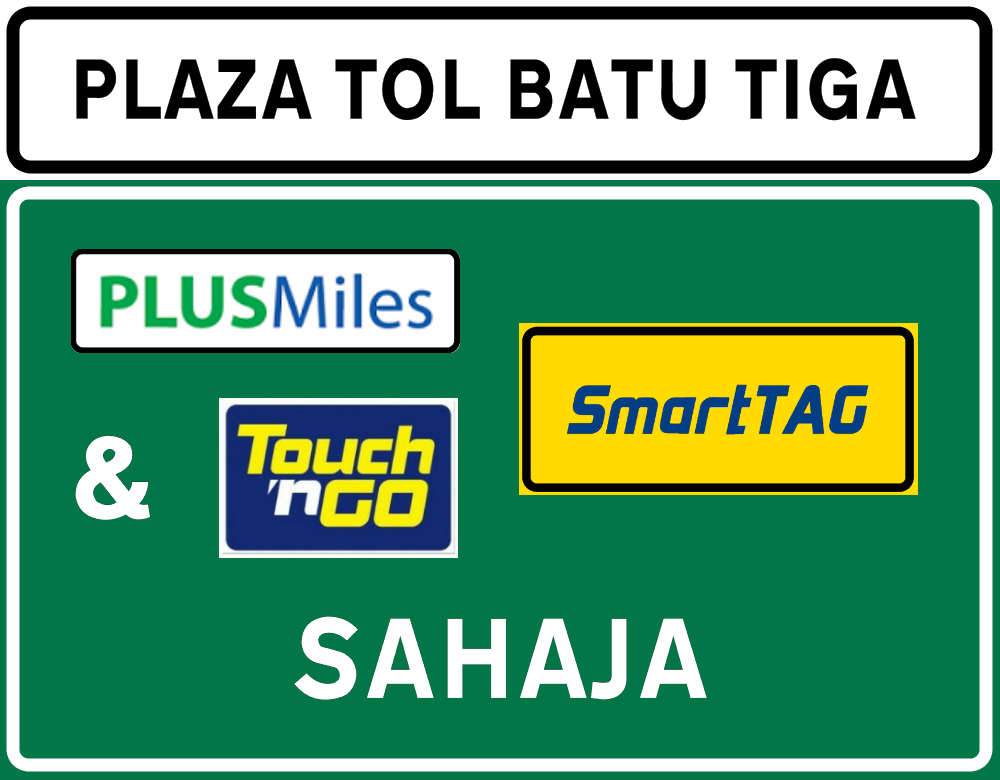
This toll plaza accepts Electronic Toll Collections (ETC) only (Note: Batu Tiga Toll Plaza was demolished in 2017)

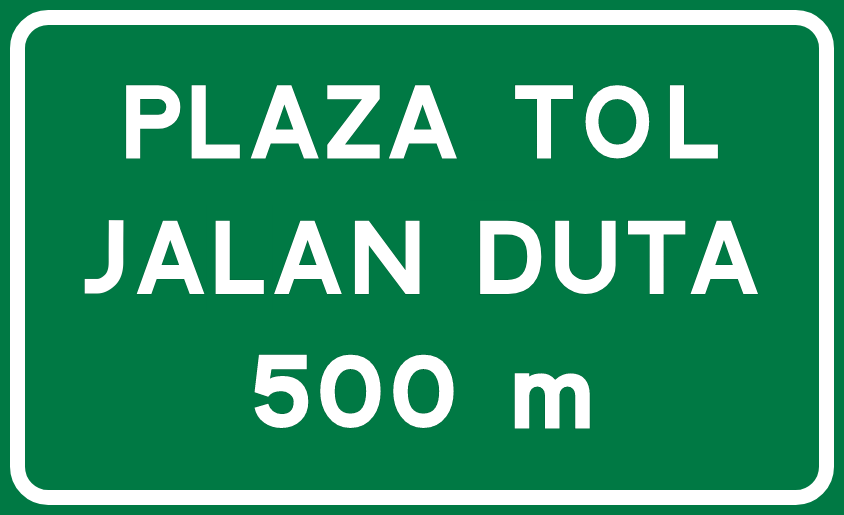
Toll plaza ahead in 500 metres with its name

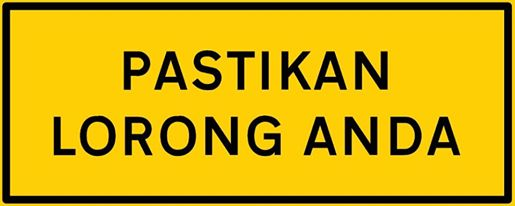
Keep your lane

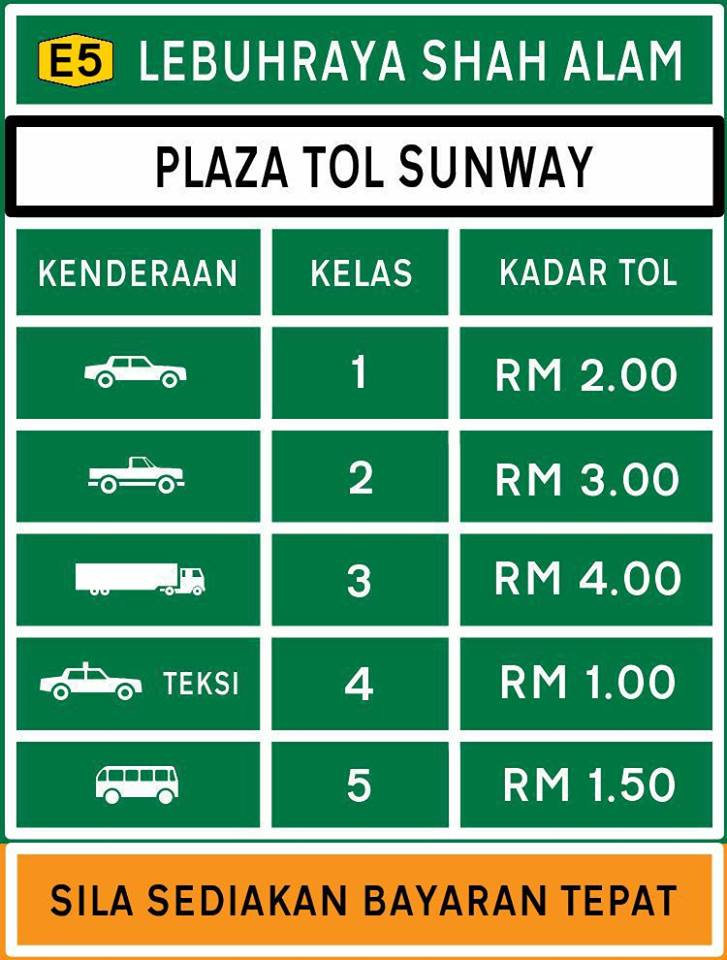
Toll fare rates list

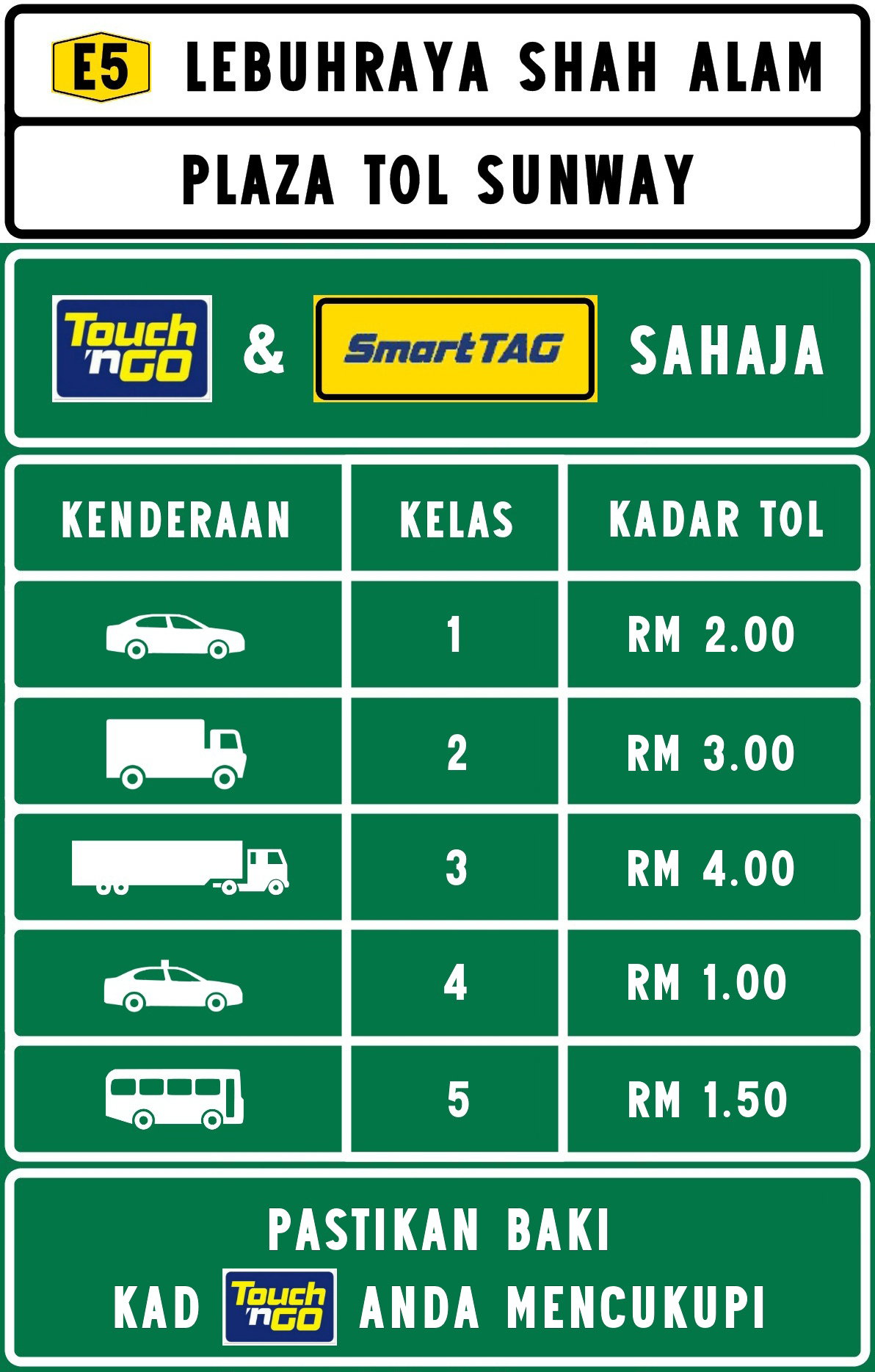
Toll fare rates list (electronic toll collection (ETC) only)

Motorcycle entry lane on expressway signs

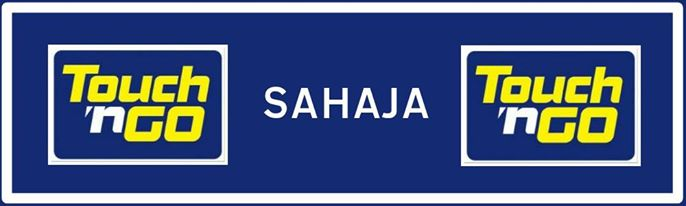
Touch 'n Go lane

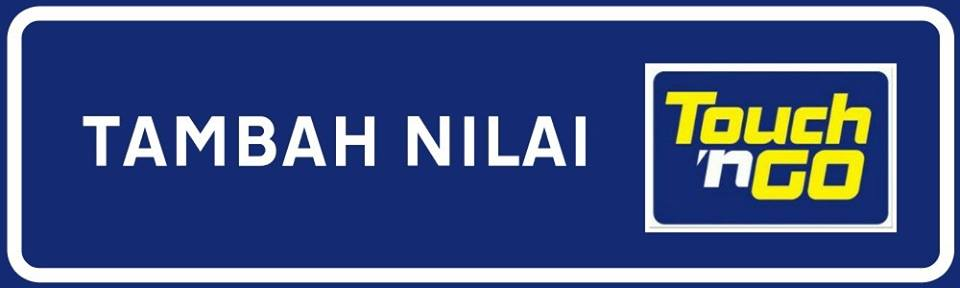
Touch 'n Go reload lane

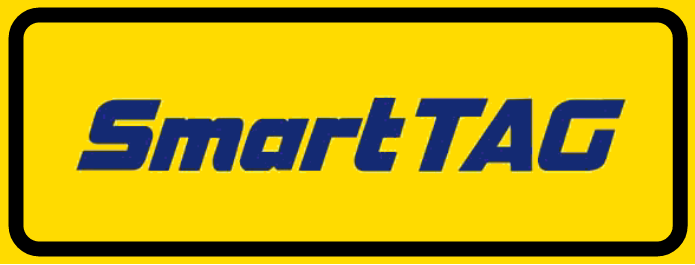
SmartTAG lane

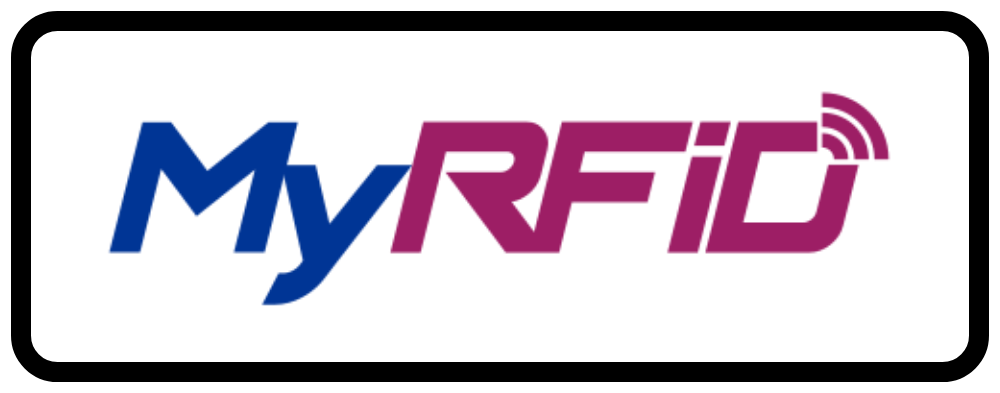
RFID sign

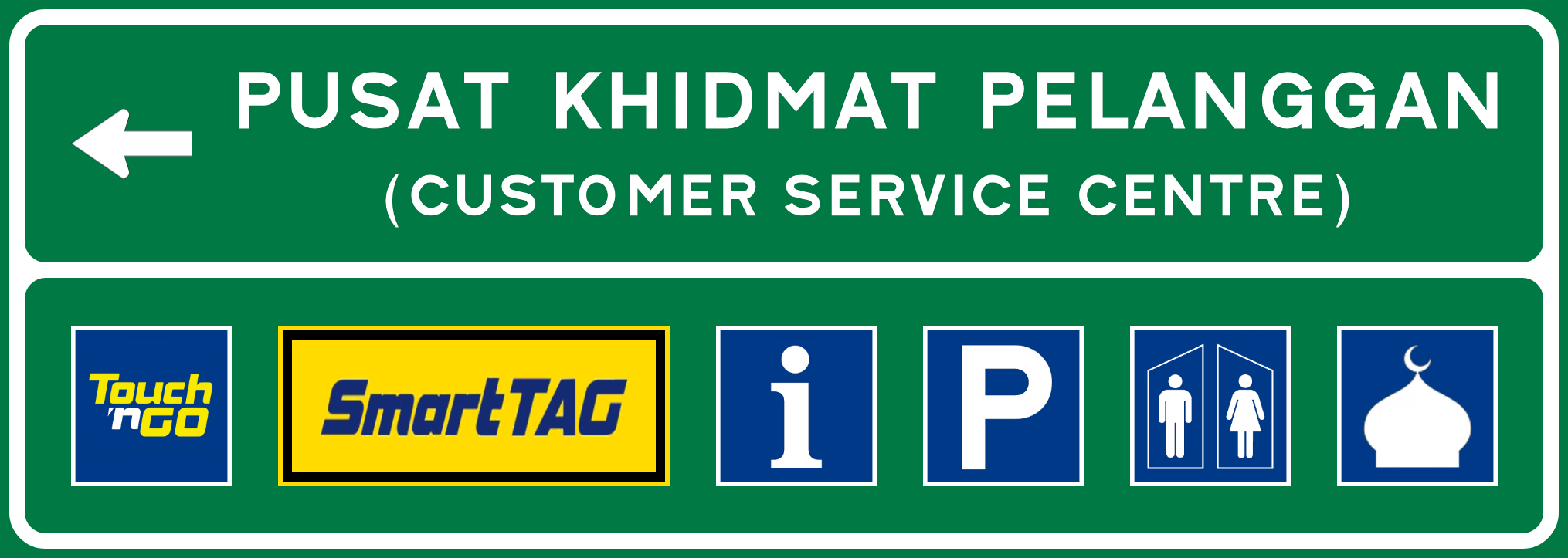
Customer Service Centre sign, usually found at toll plaza

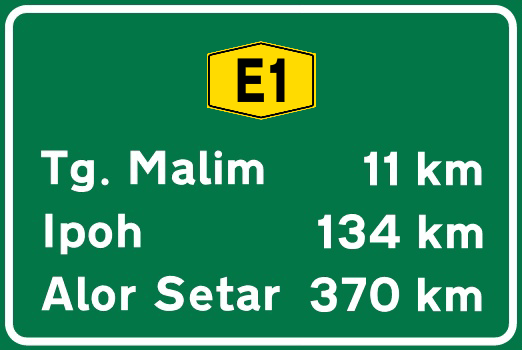
Expressway distance sign

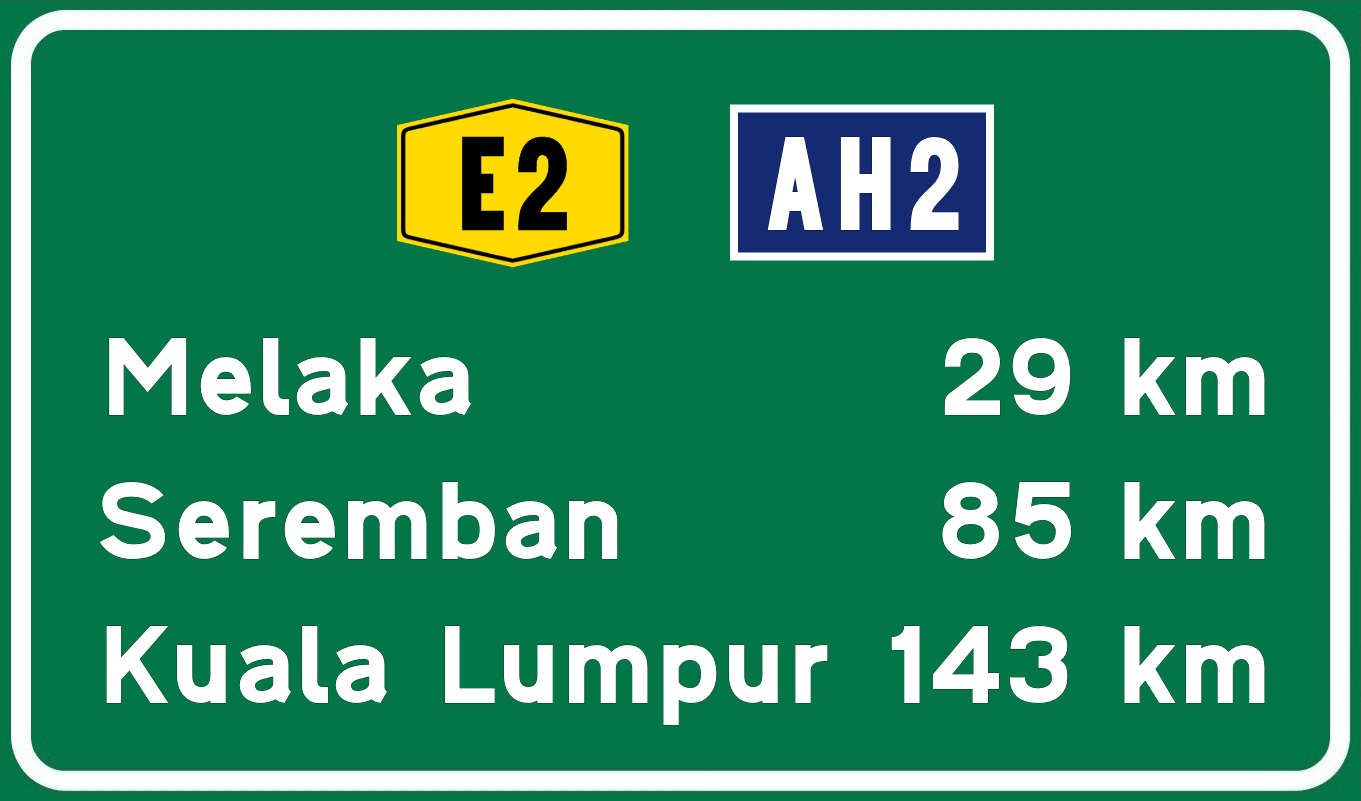
Expressway distance sign with Asian Highway route shield

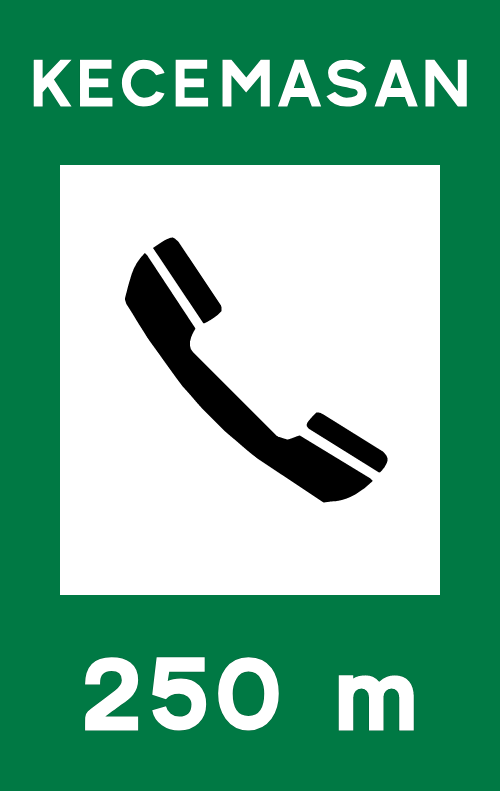
Emergency signs with SOS logo

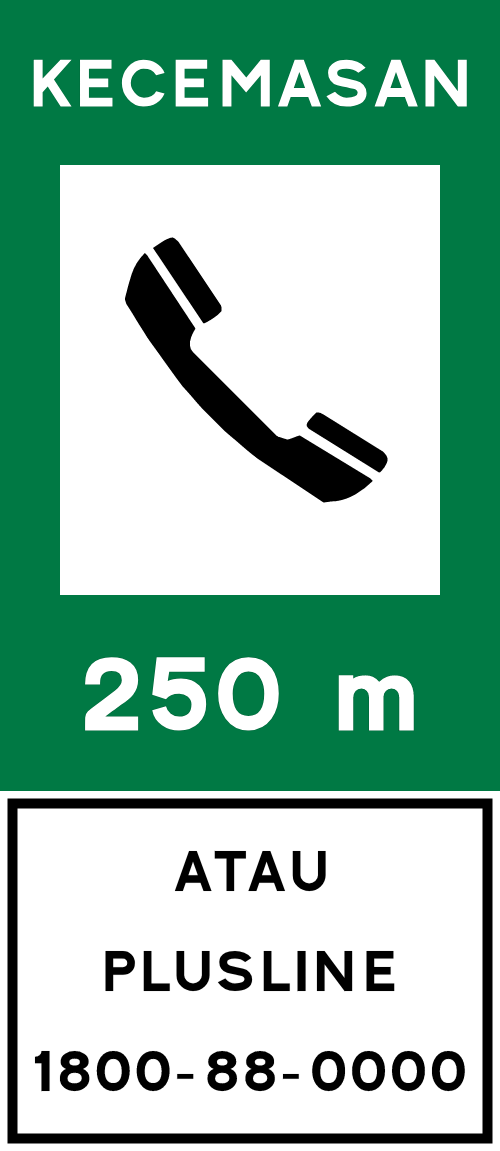
Emergency SOS sign with highway hotline number

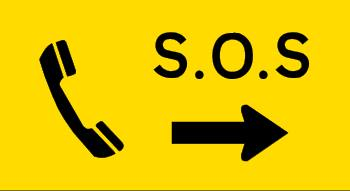
SOS nearby signs, usually found at road barrier

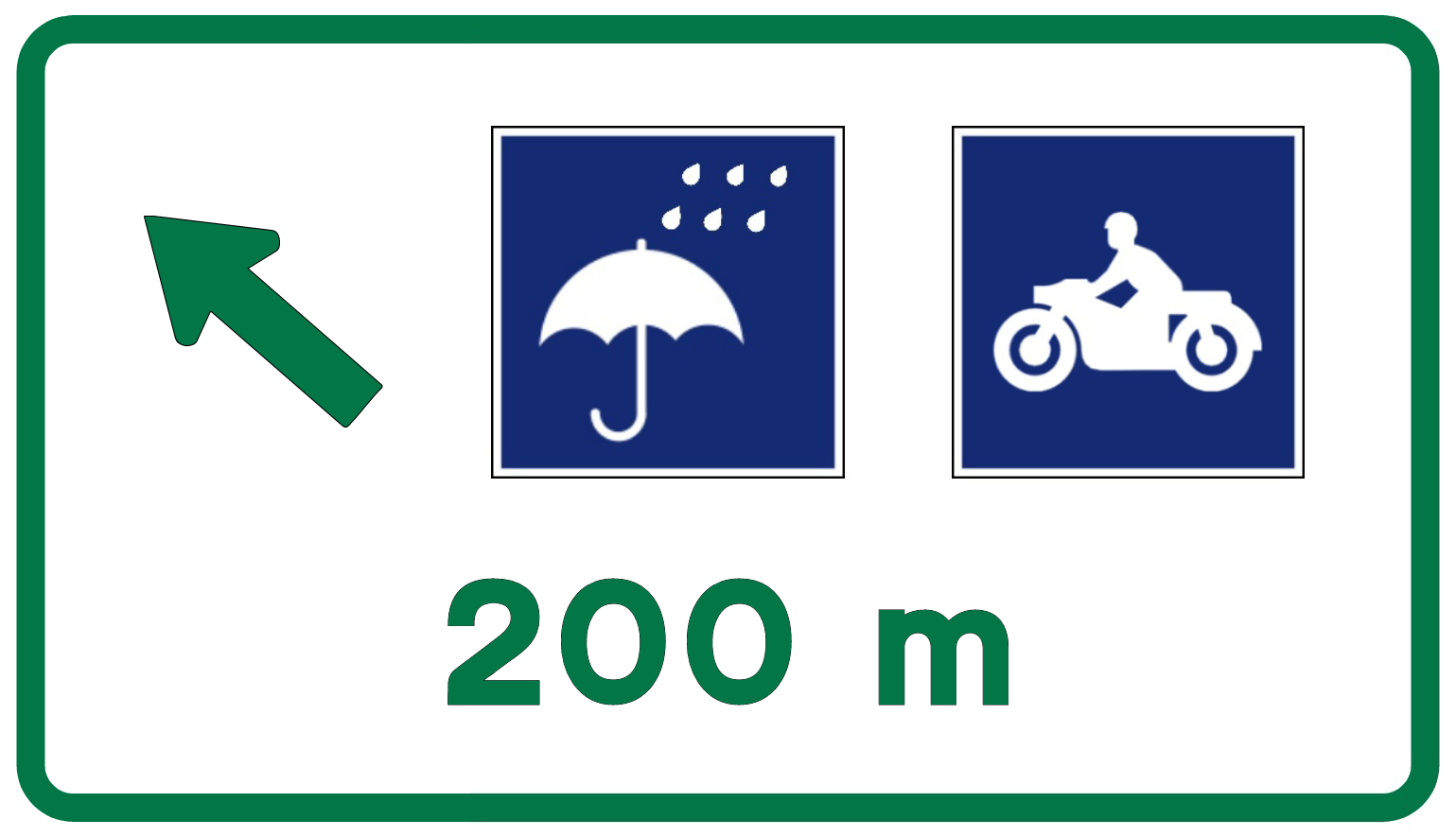
Shelter for motorcycles, 200 metres away

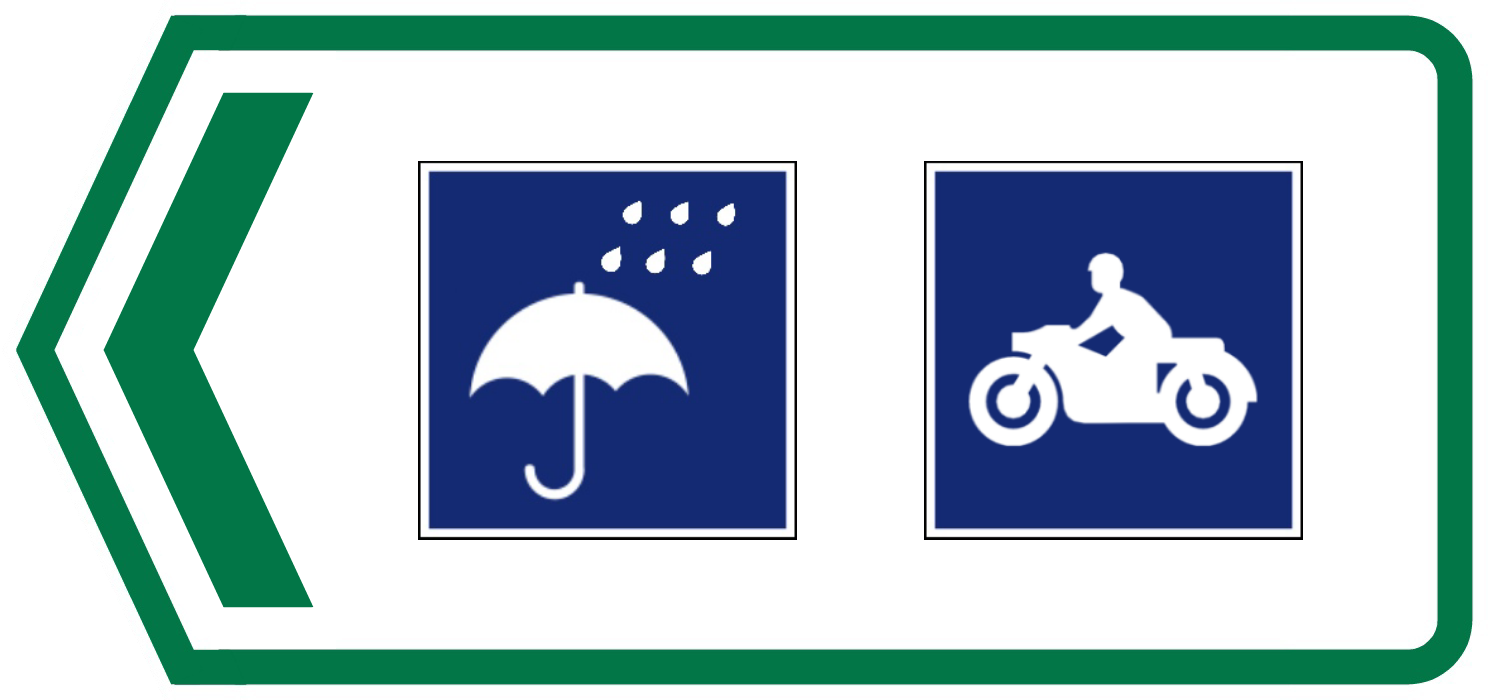
Shelter for motorcycles on the left

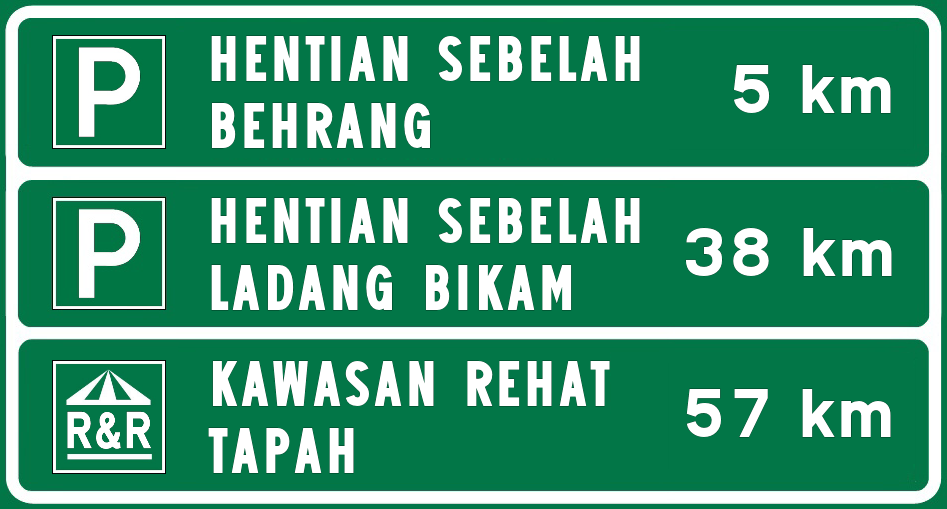
Layby and Rest and Service Area distance sign

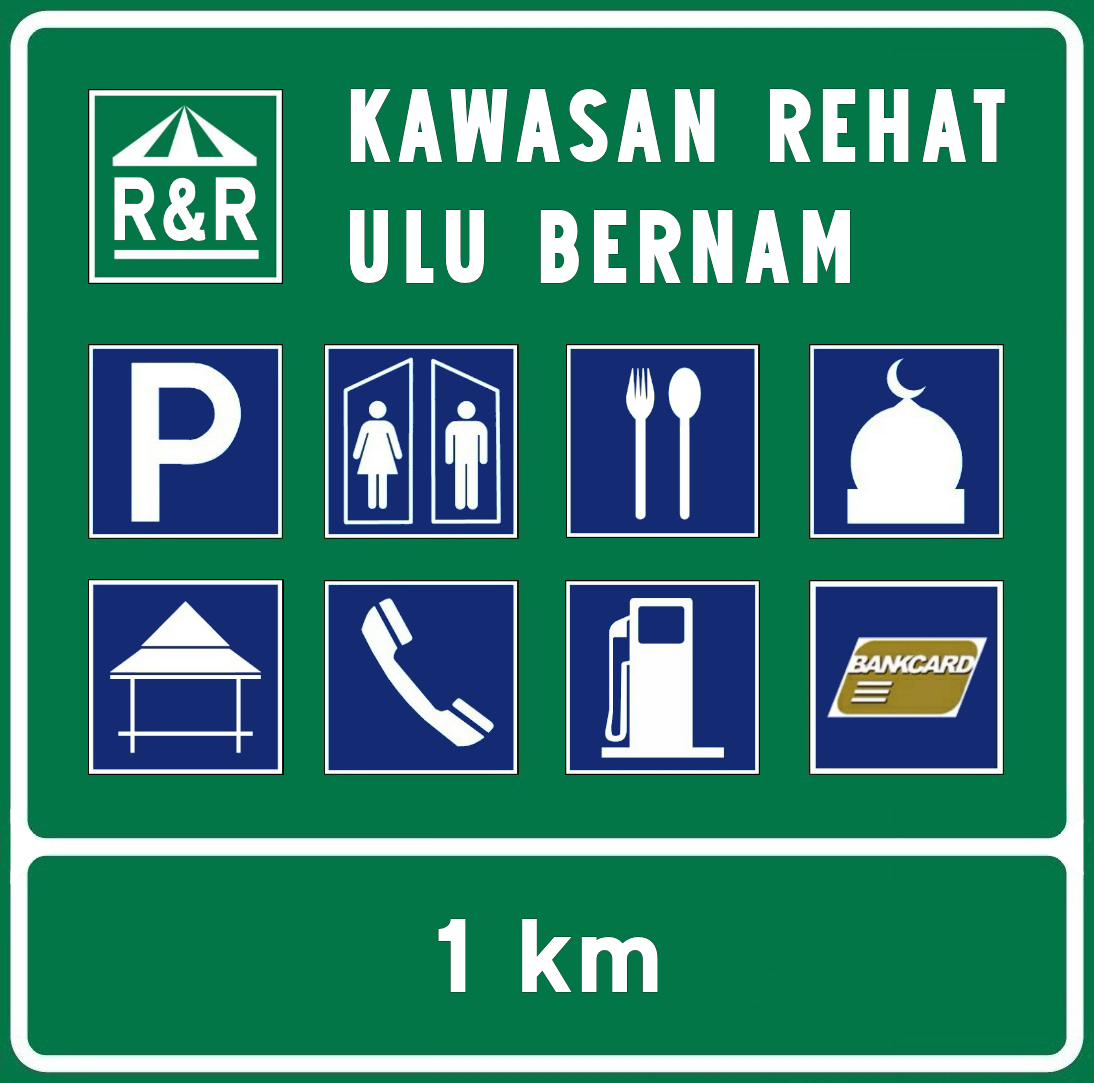
Rest and Service area 1 kilometre away

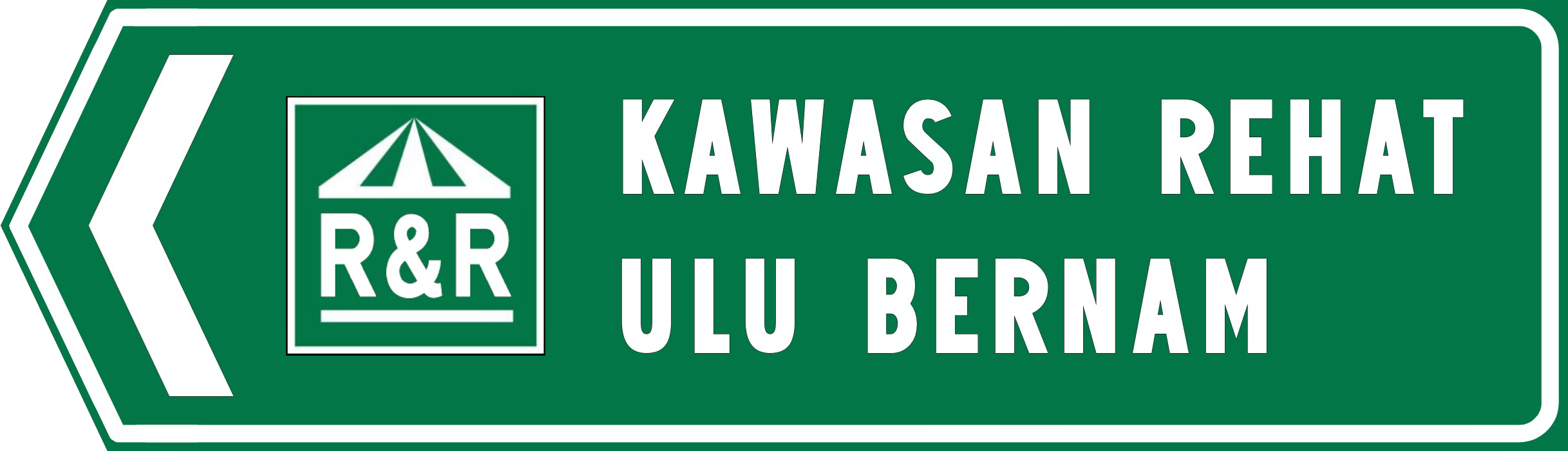
R&R entry

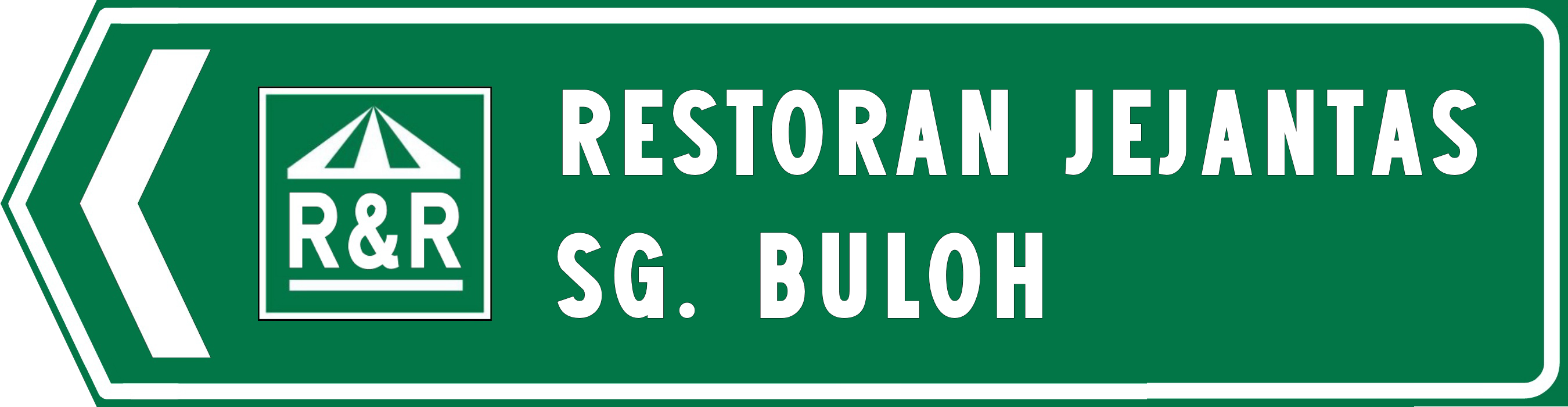
Overhead Bridge Restaurant (OBR) entry sign

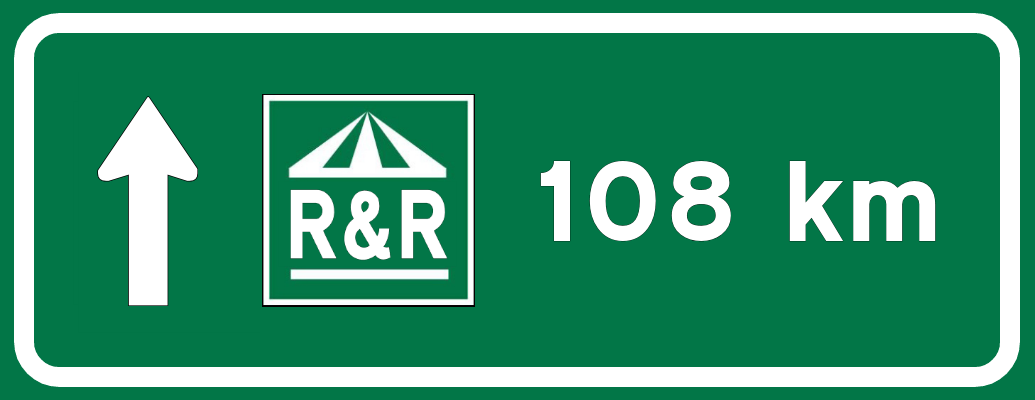
Next R&R signs, usually found after R&R

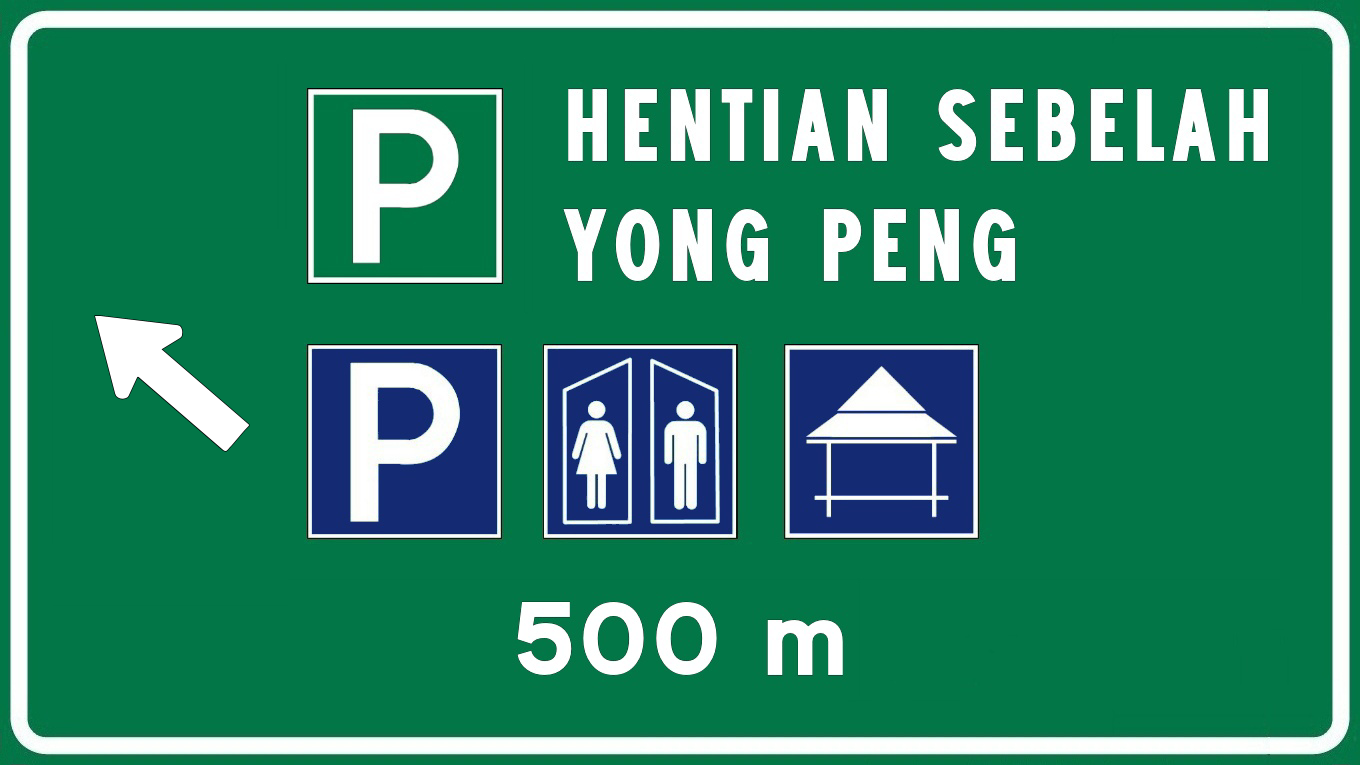
Layby sign

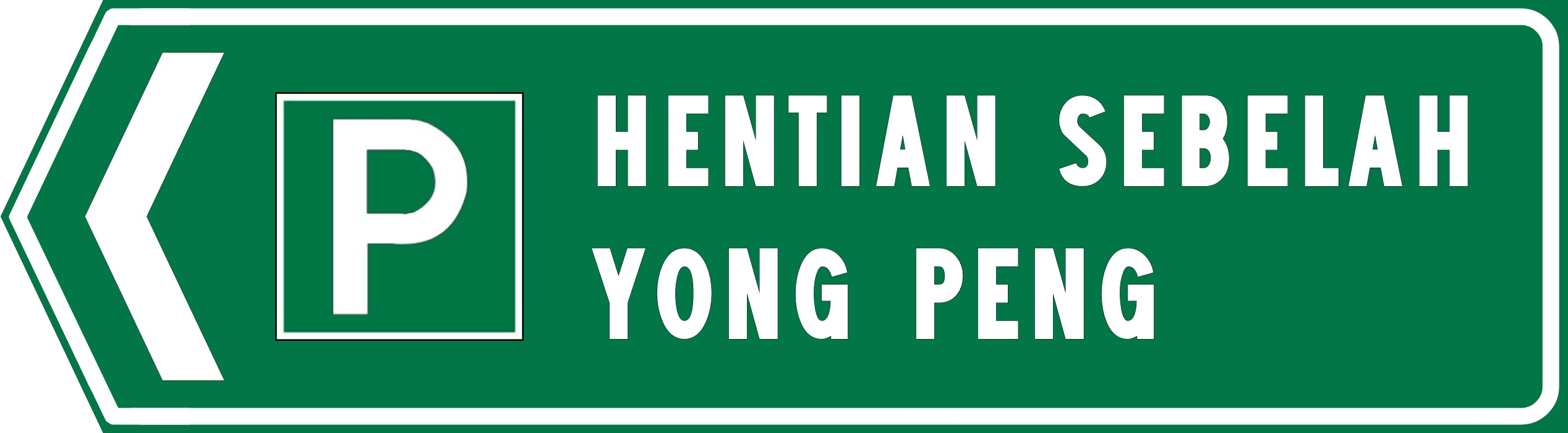
Layby entry

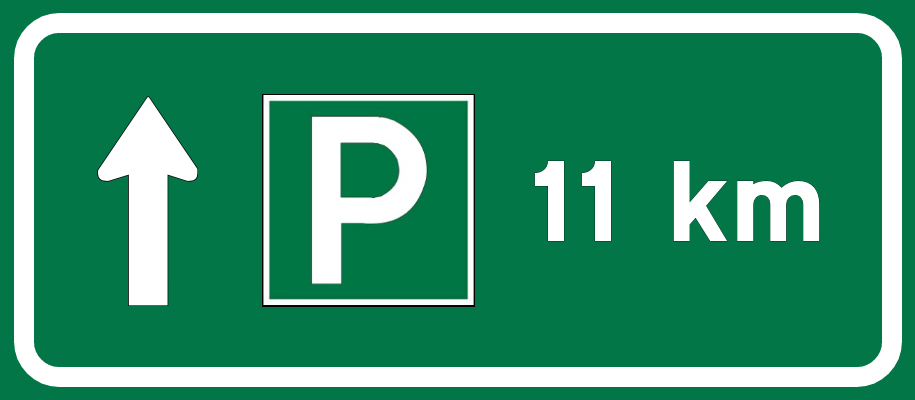
Next layby signs, usually found after Layby

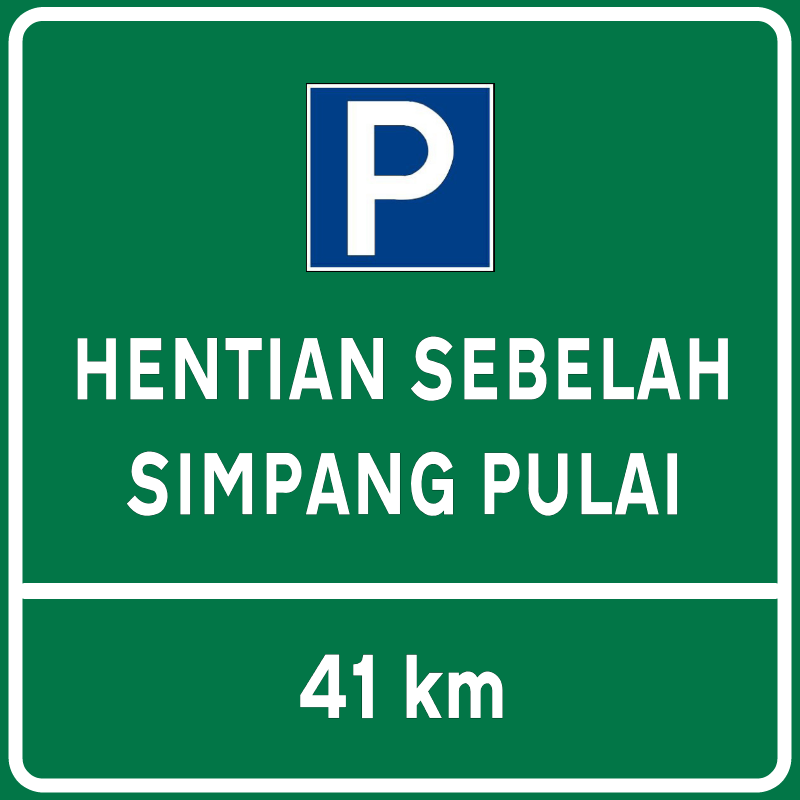
Next Layby/R&R signs, usually found near the entrance of Layby/R&R.

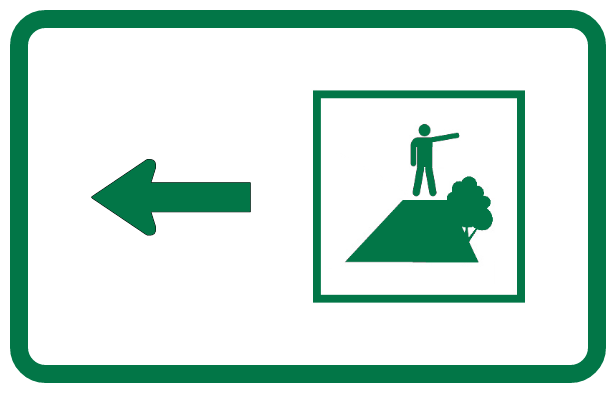
Direction to Vista Point

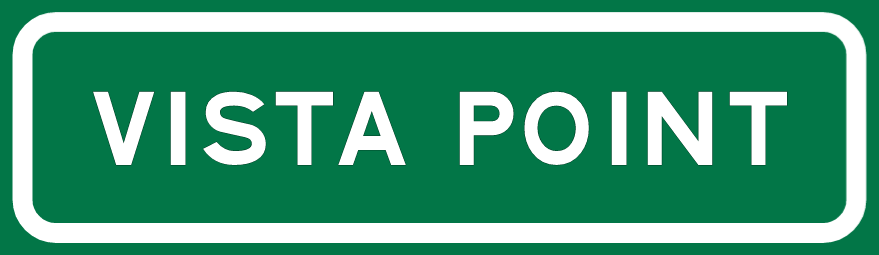
Vista Point sign

Tunnel 500 metres ahead

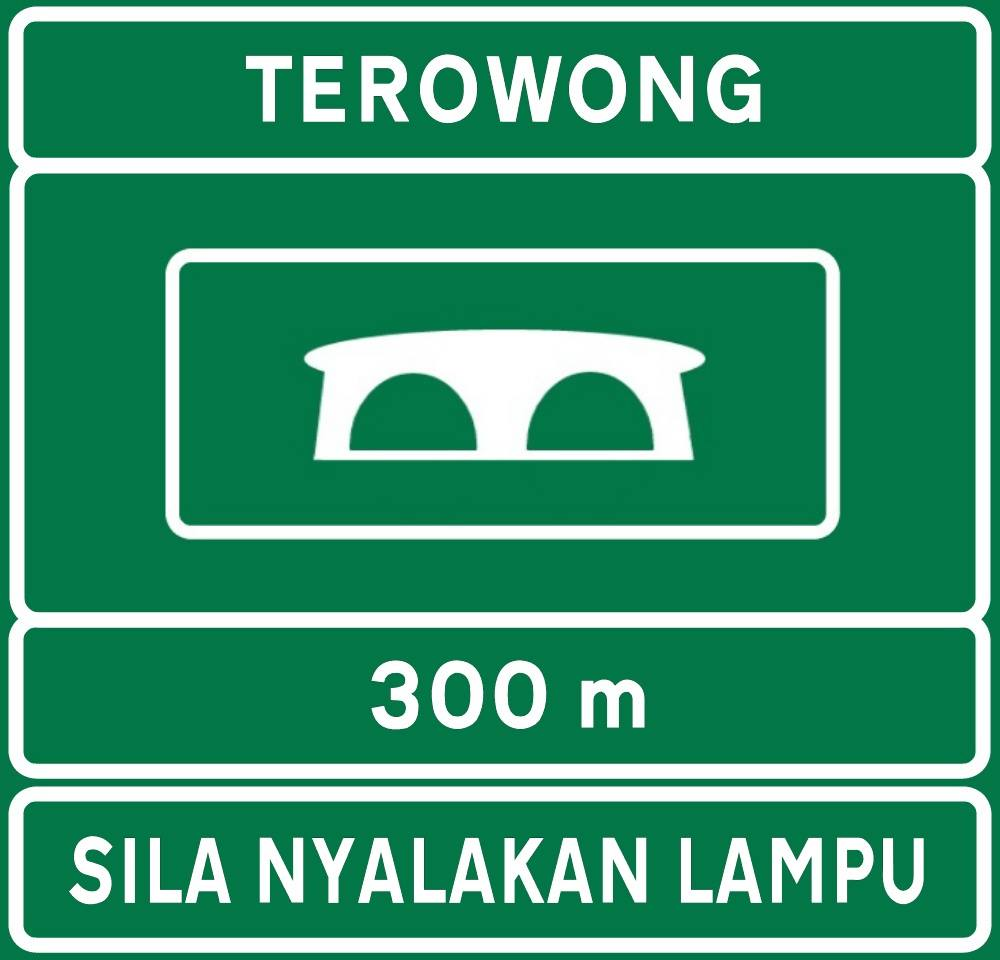
Tunnel ahead, please turn on headlights

Penang Bridge logo

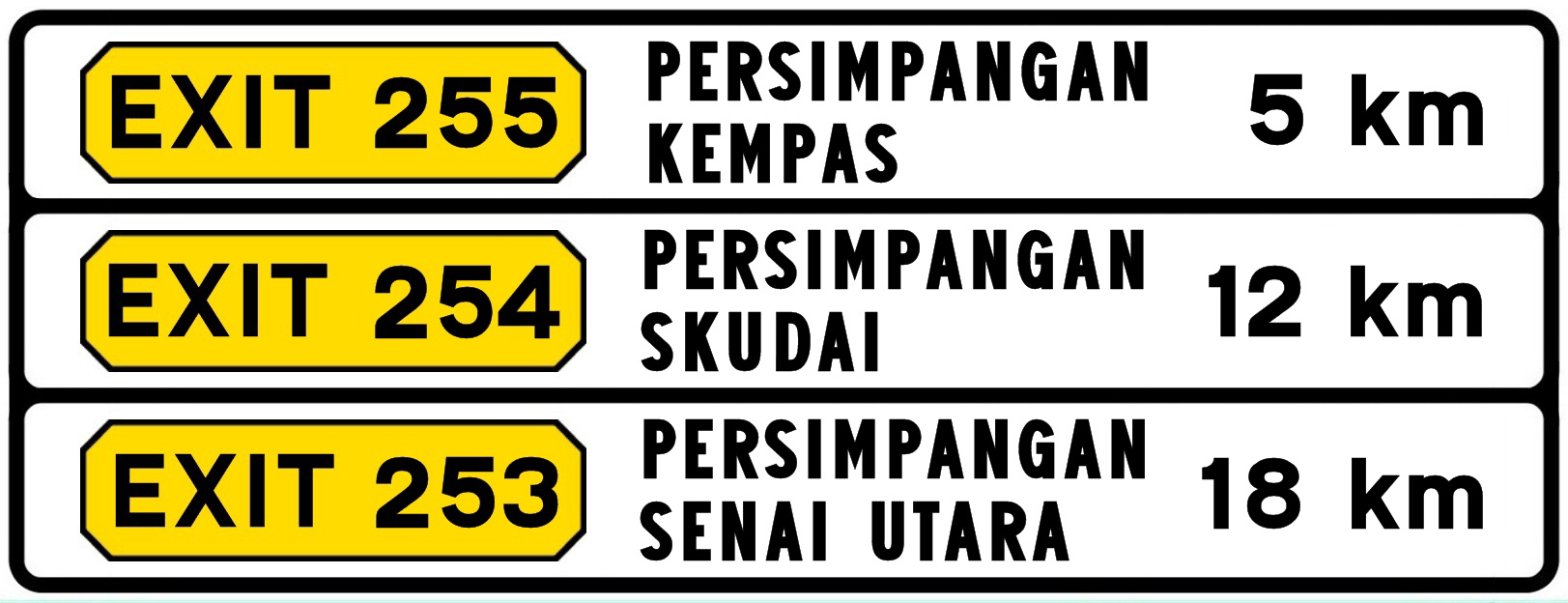
Next interchange exit sign (Often found when the next exit is 5 kilometres away)

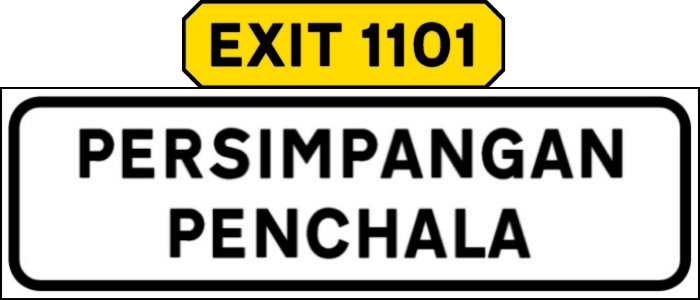
Name of interchange including exit signs (Usually found on expressways in urban areas)

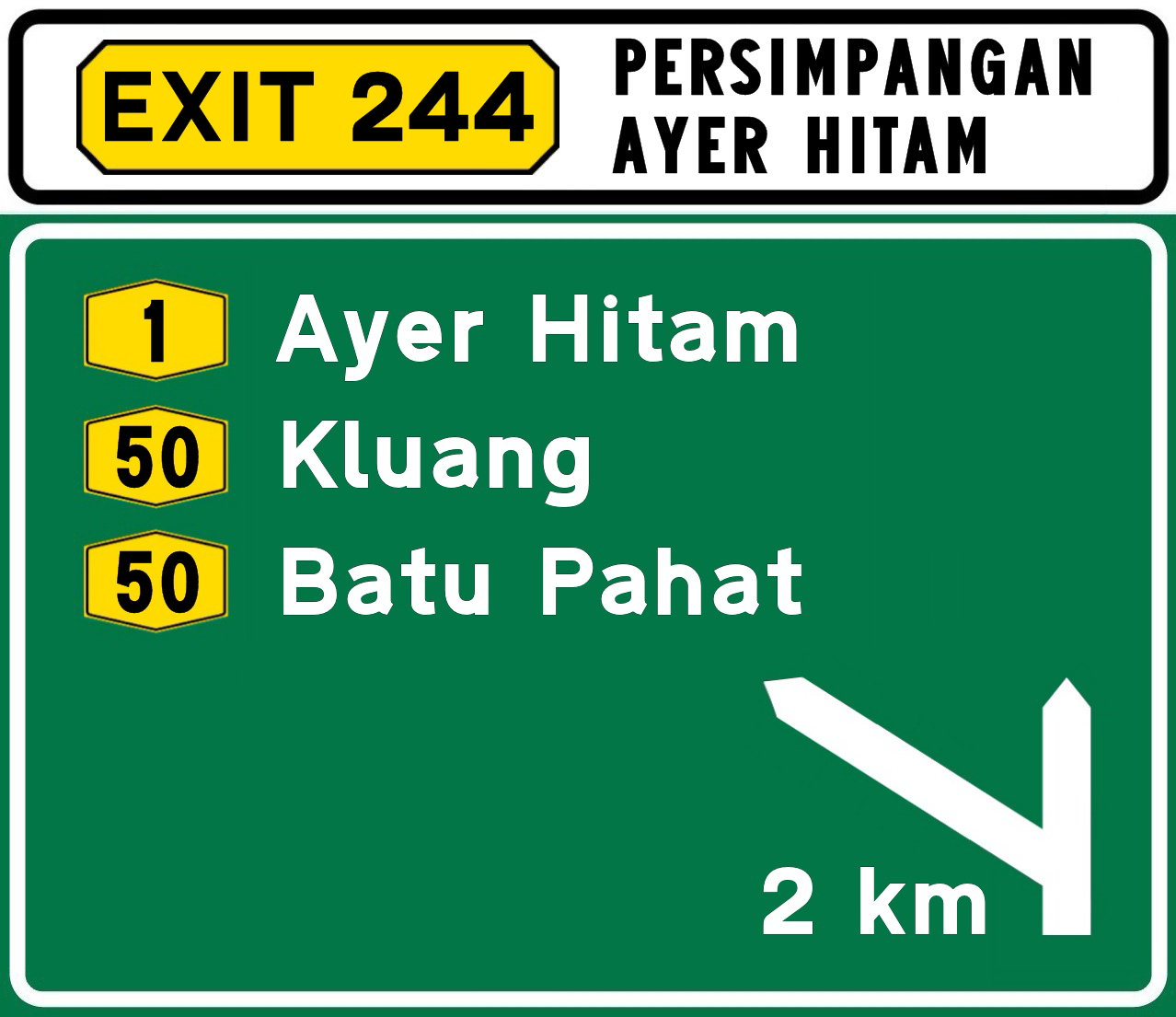
Exit 2 kilometres away

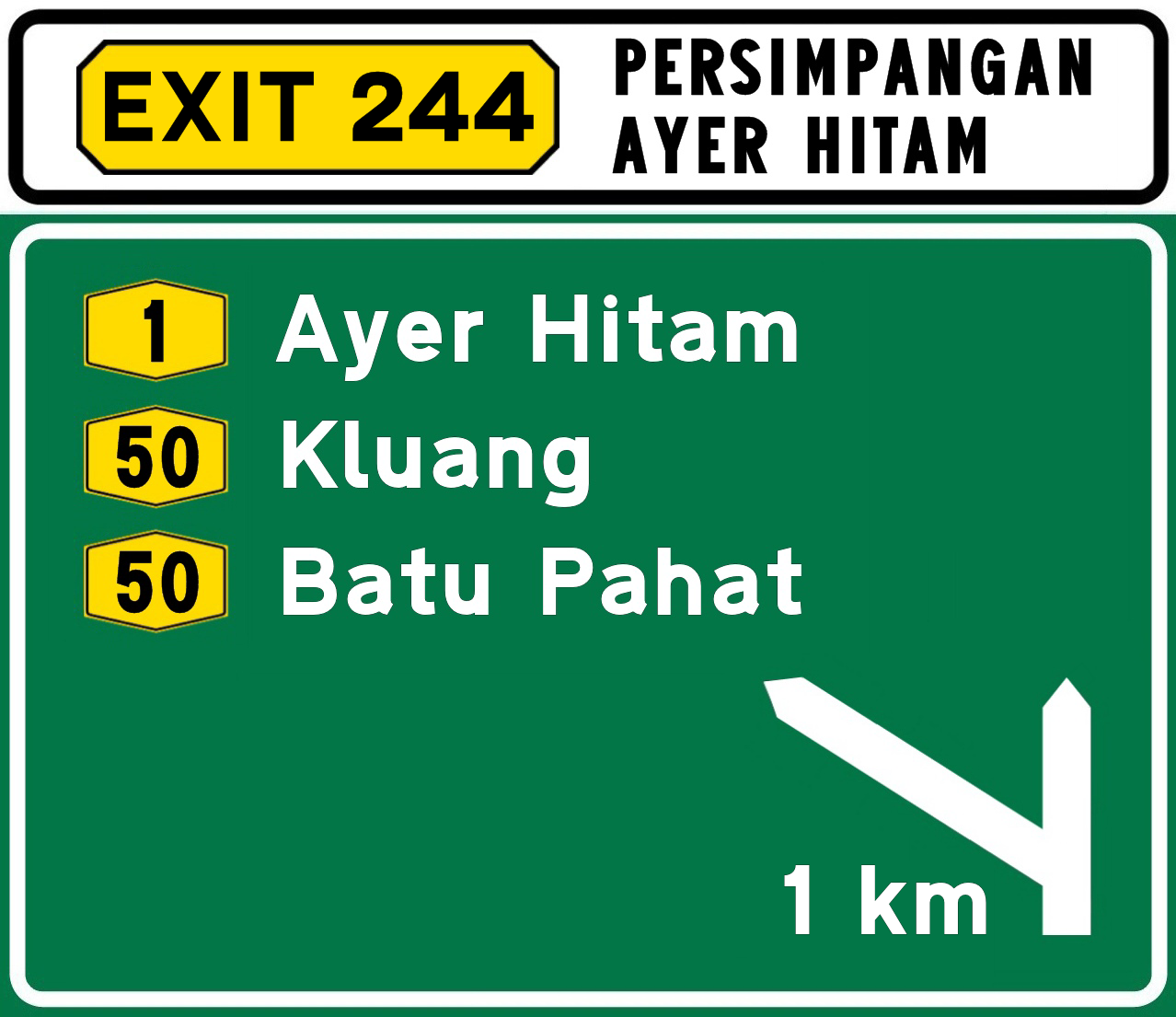
Exit 1 kilometre away

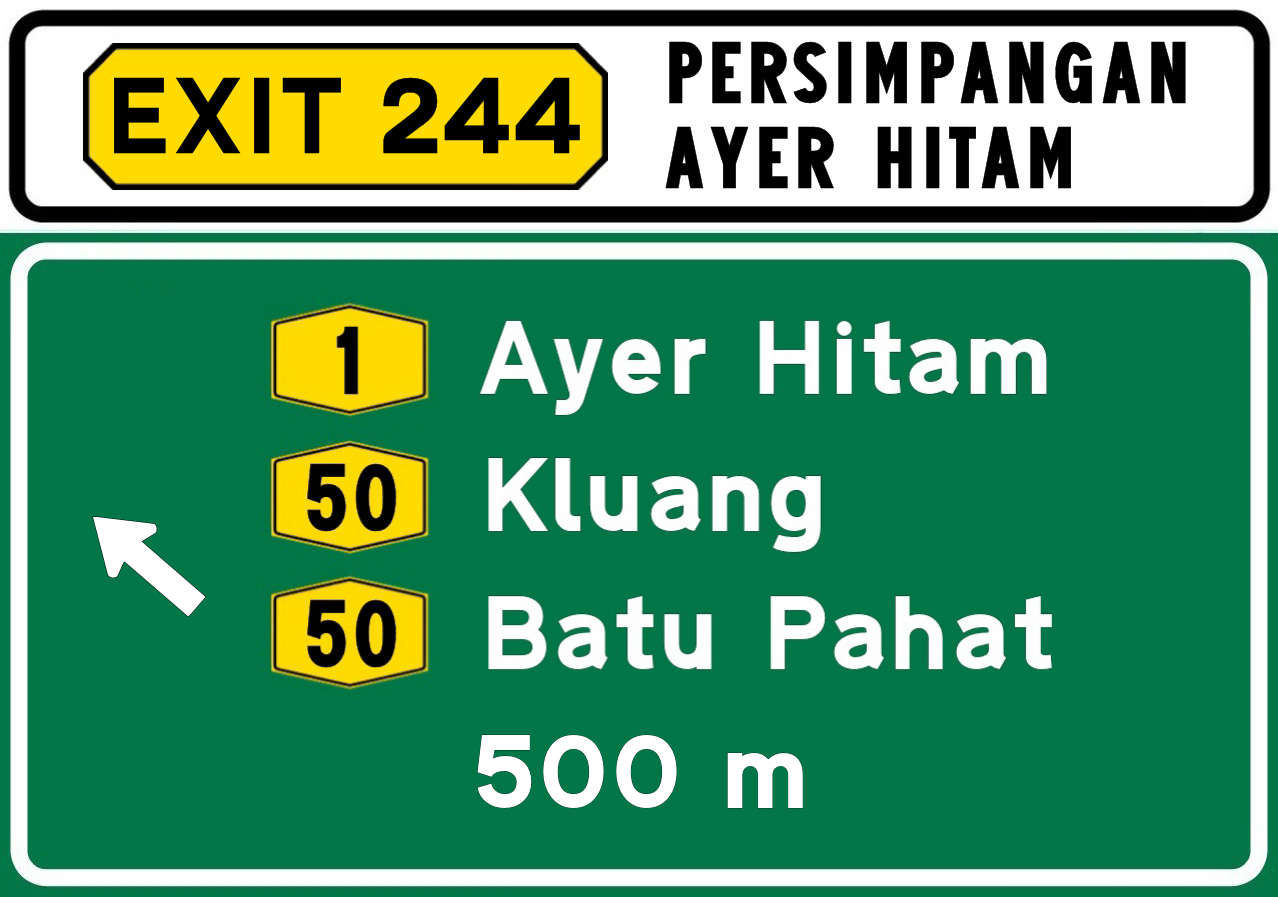
Exit 500 metres away

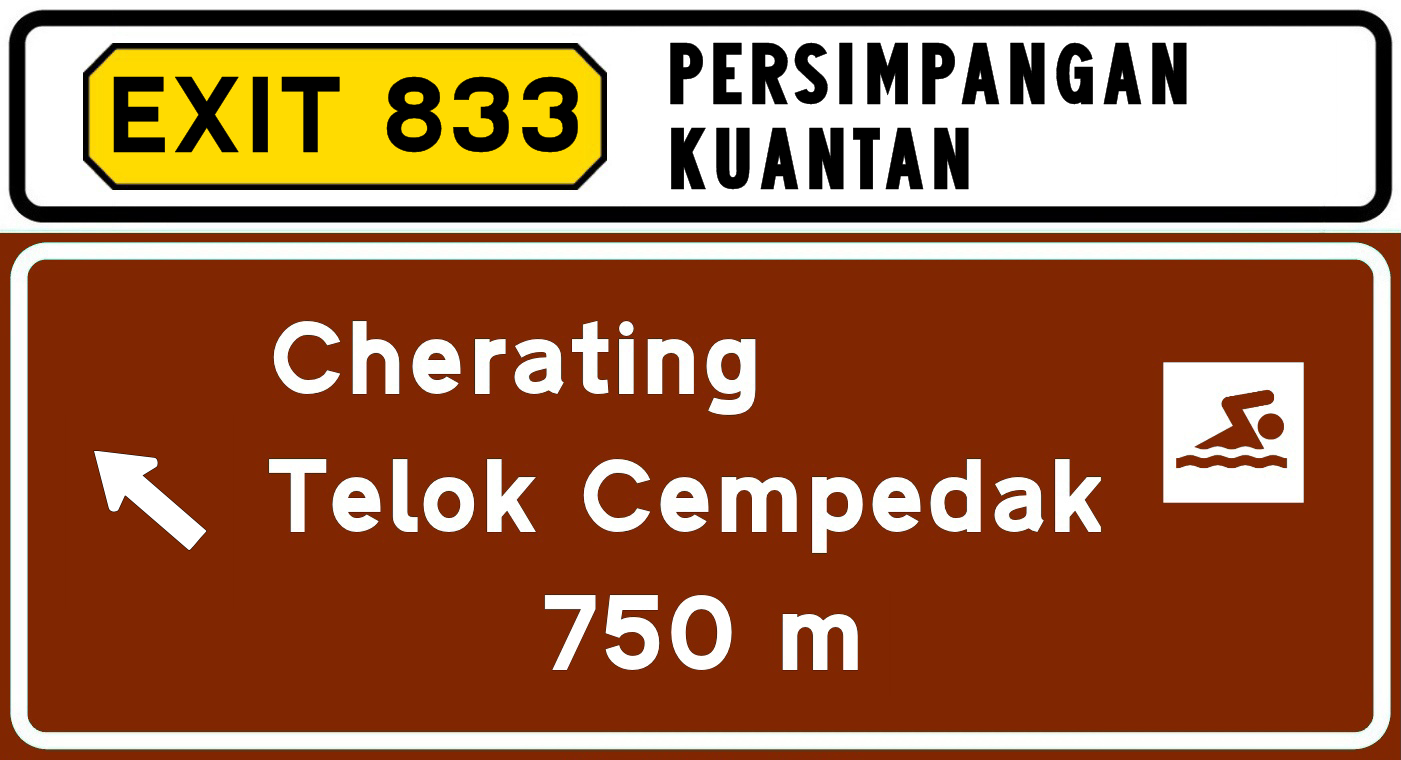
Expressway tourist exit sign

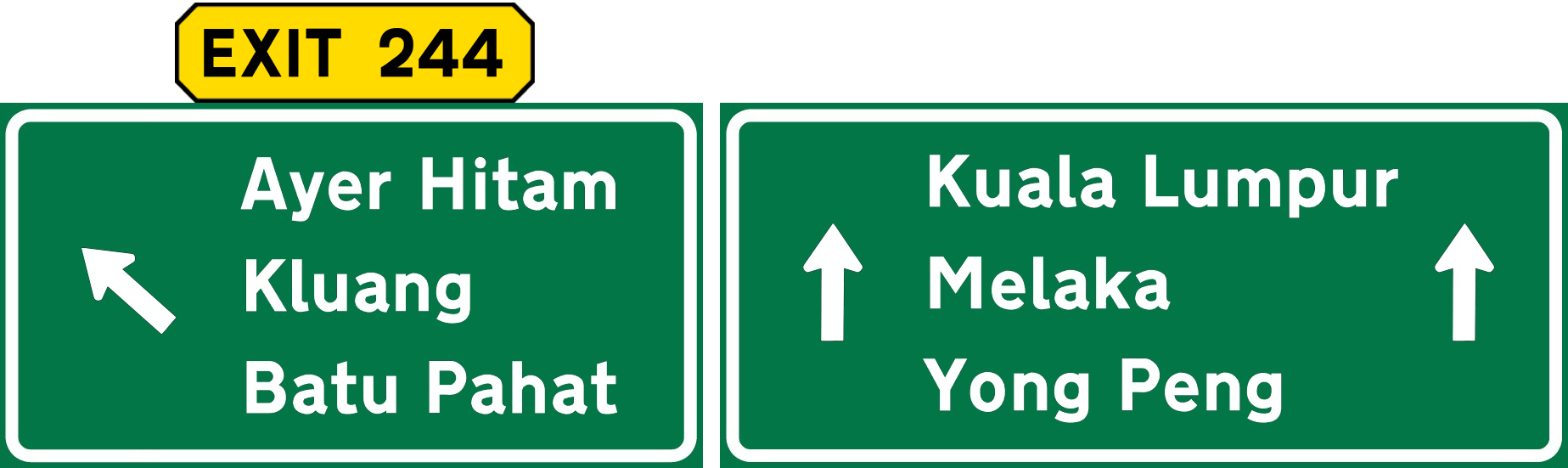
Gantry signs:- Exit approaching

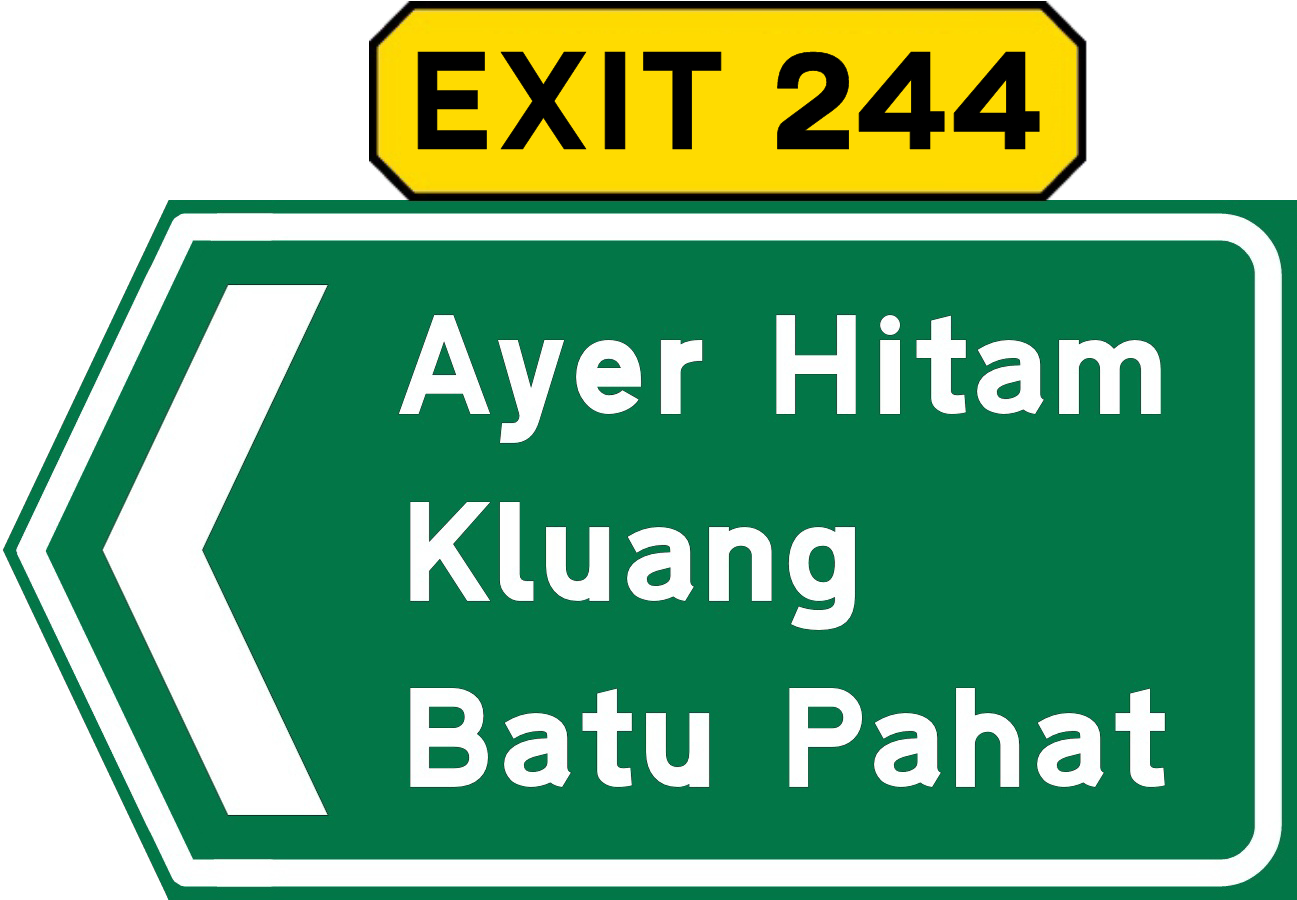
Exit to the left sign

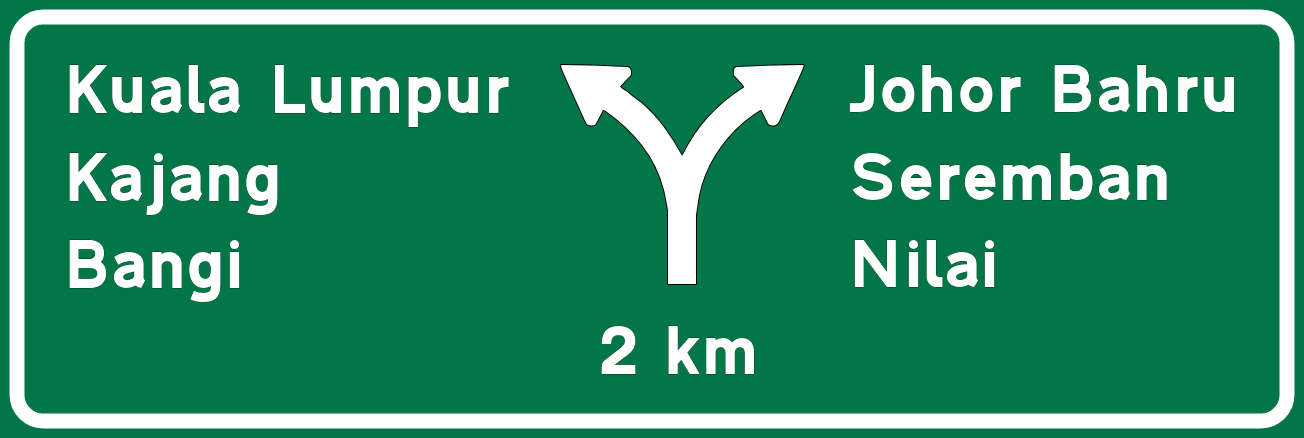
Gantry sign:- Expressway interchange 2 kilometres away

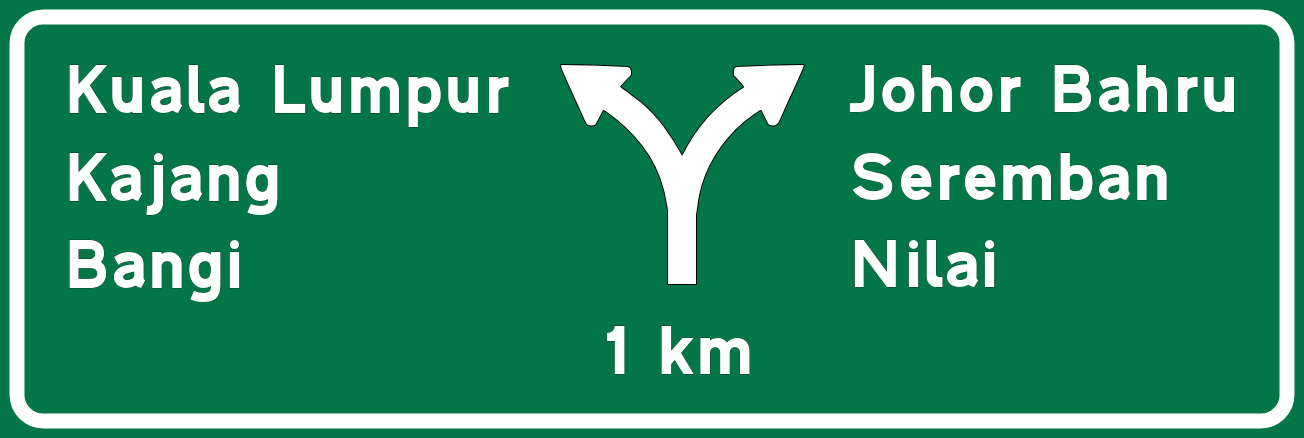
Gantry sign:- Expressway interchange 1 kilometre away

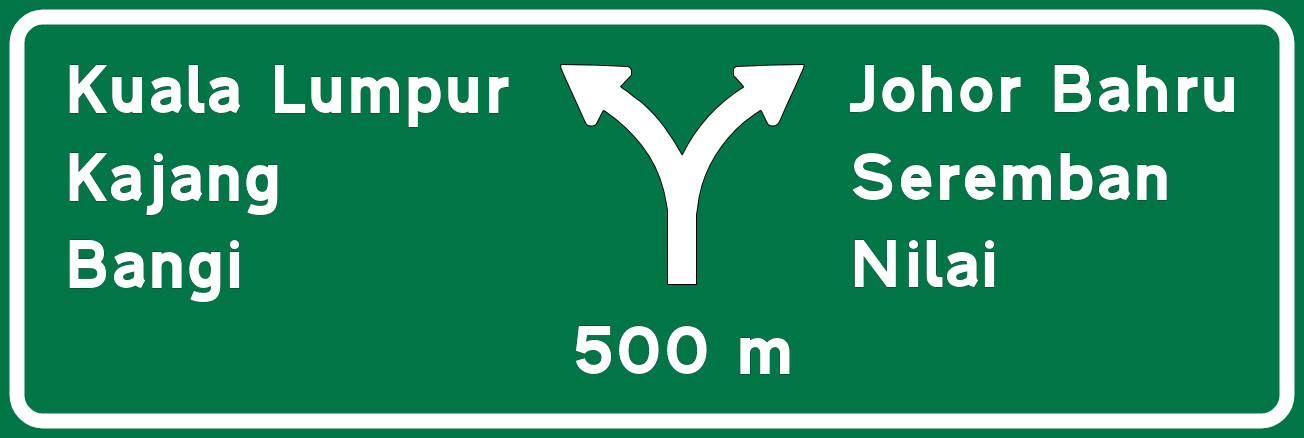
Gantry sign:- Expressway interchange 500 metres away

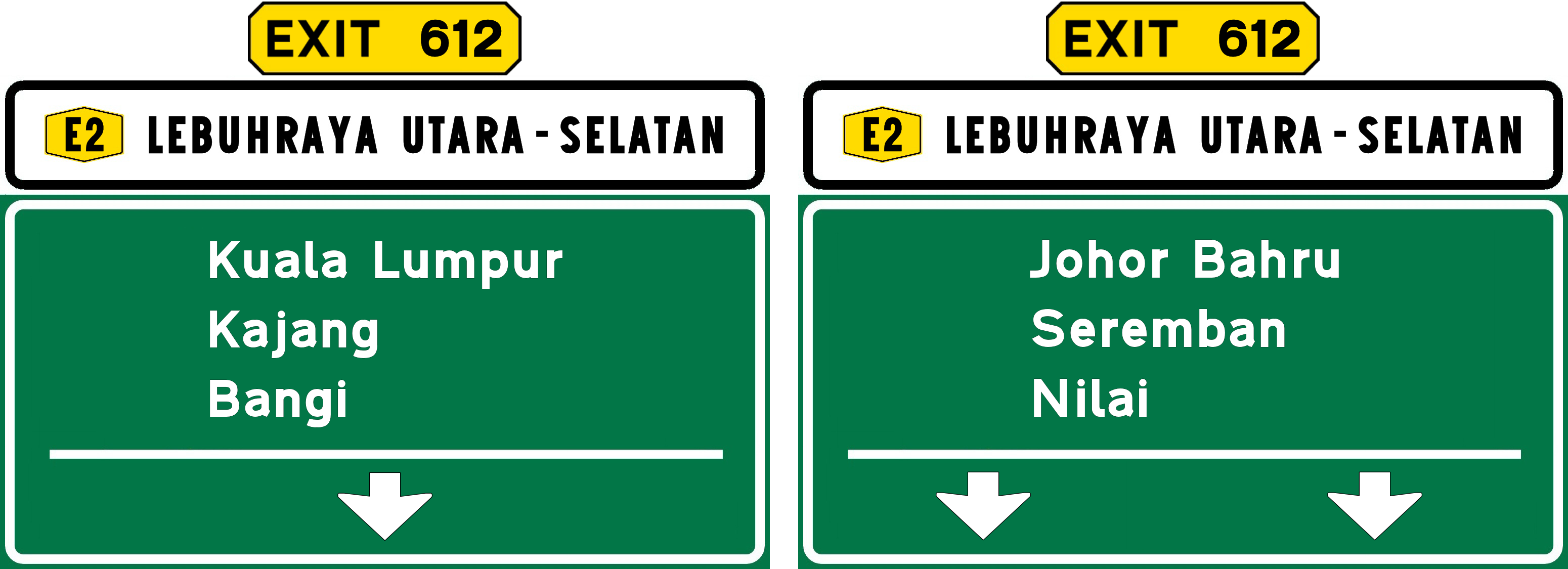
Gantry sign:- Expressway interchange 250 metres away

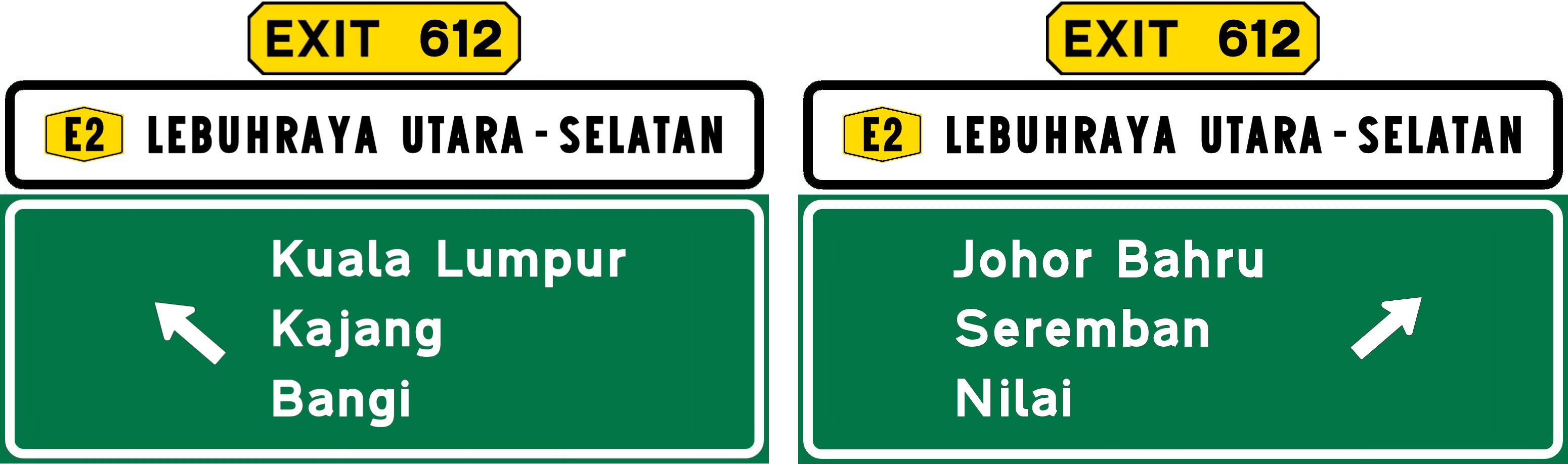
Gantry exit signs

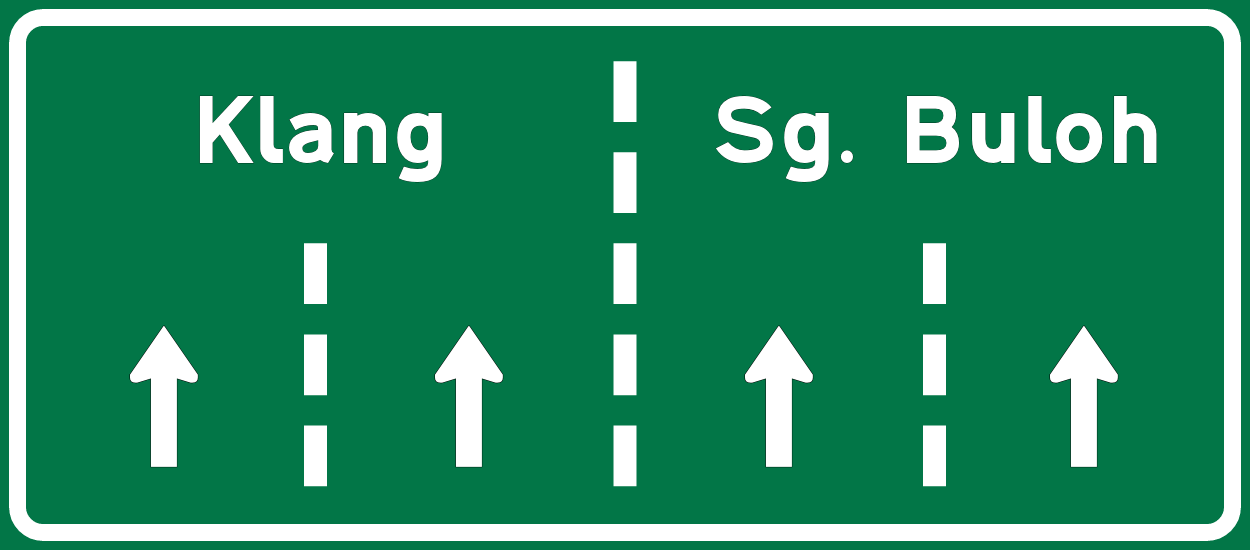
Direction lanes

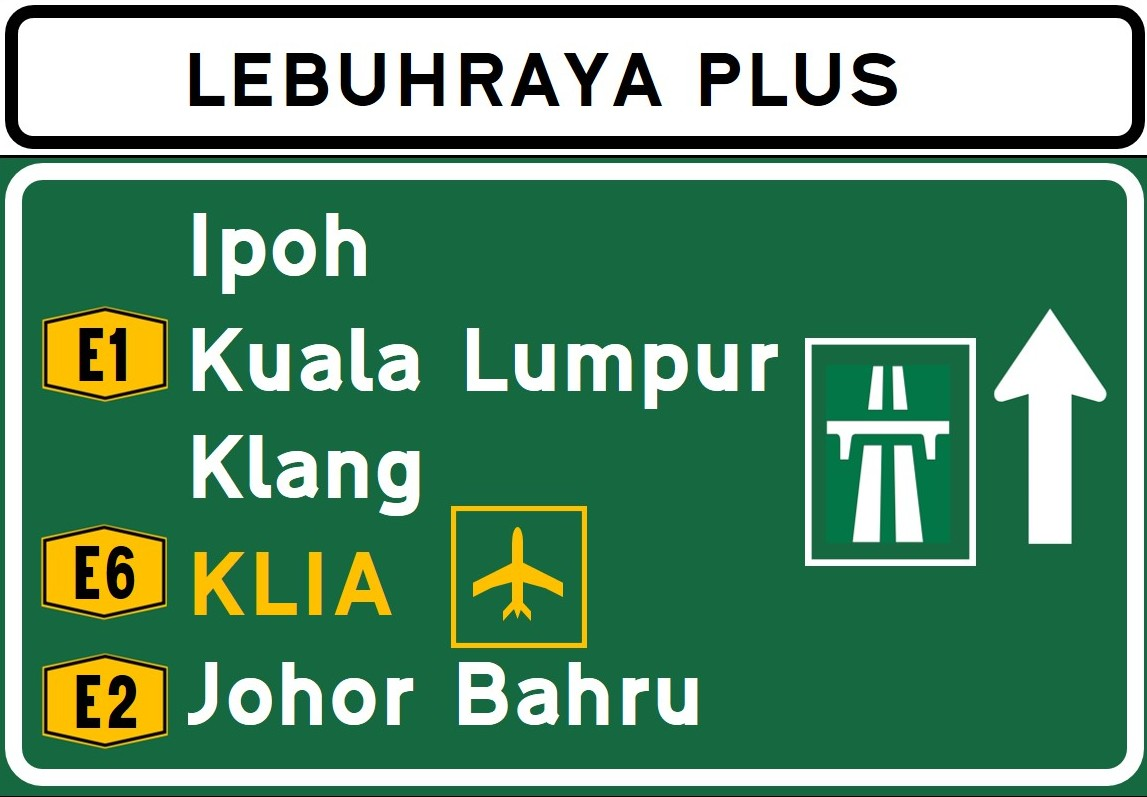
Expressways managed by the same concession company

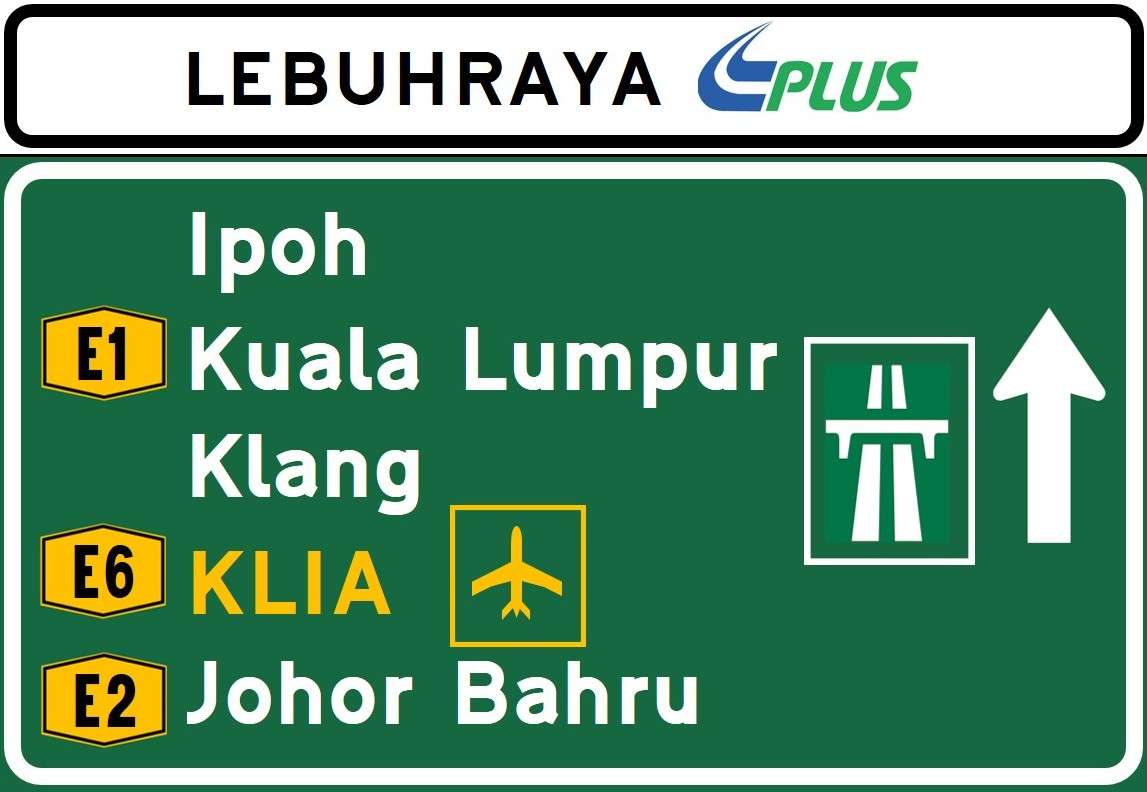
Expressways managed by the same concession company (included company logo and rarely seen)

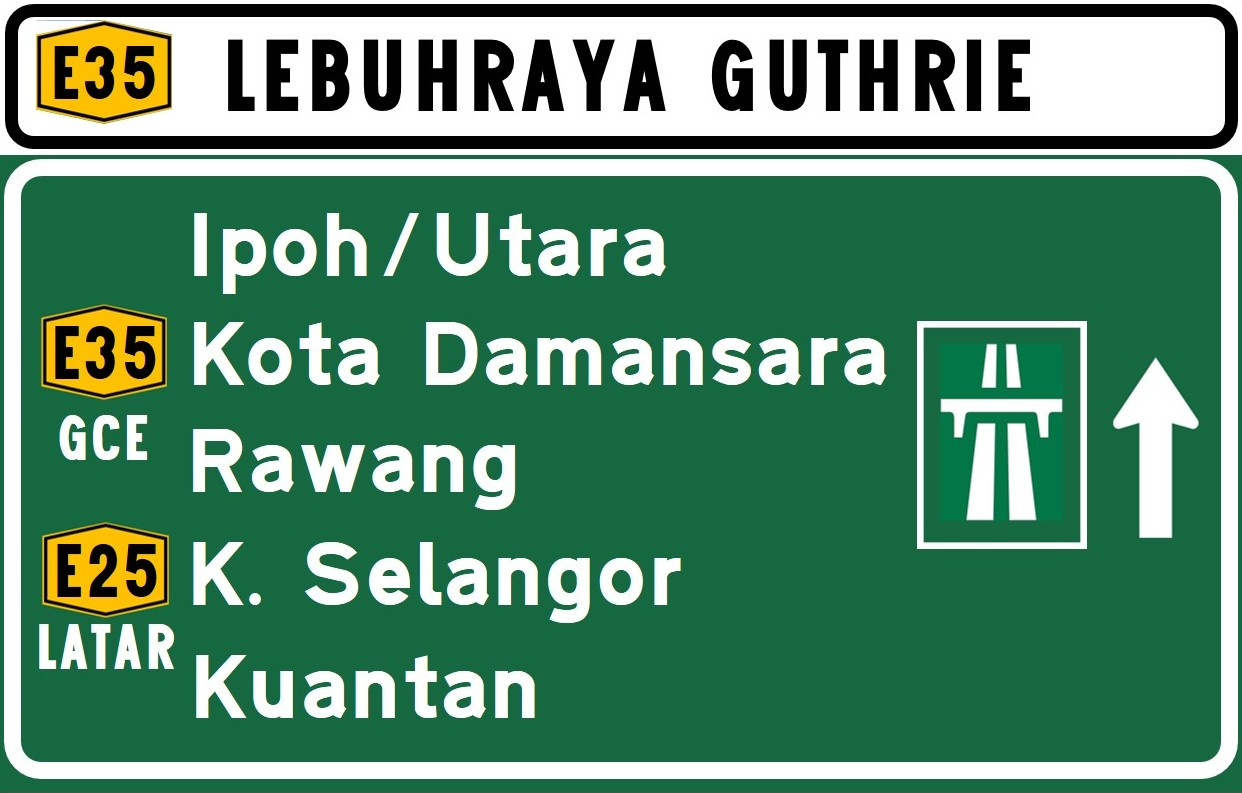
Main and nearest expressways

==== Old format expressway signs ====
Outdated sign designs that are no longer in use.

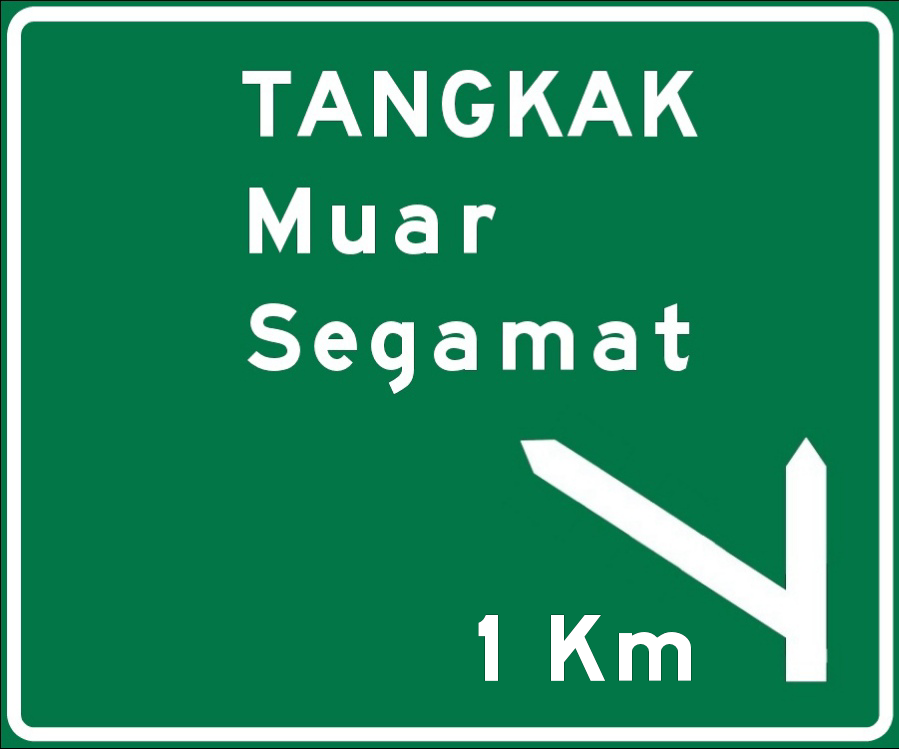
Old interchange sign

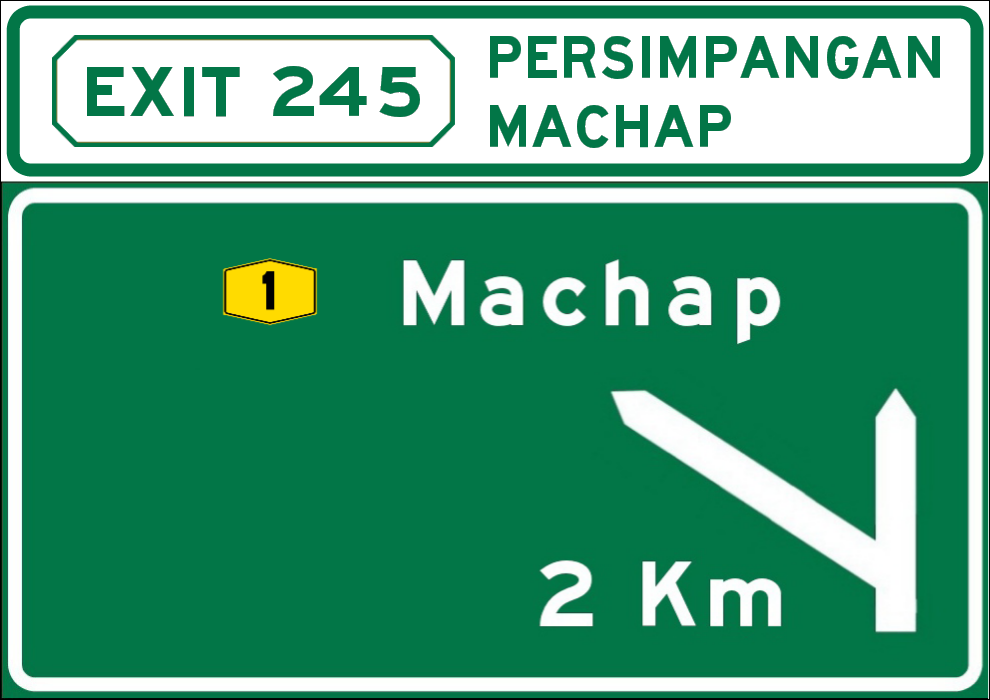
Old interchange sign with exit number

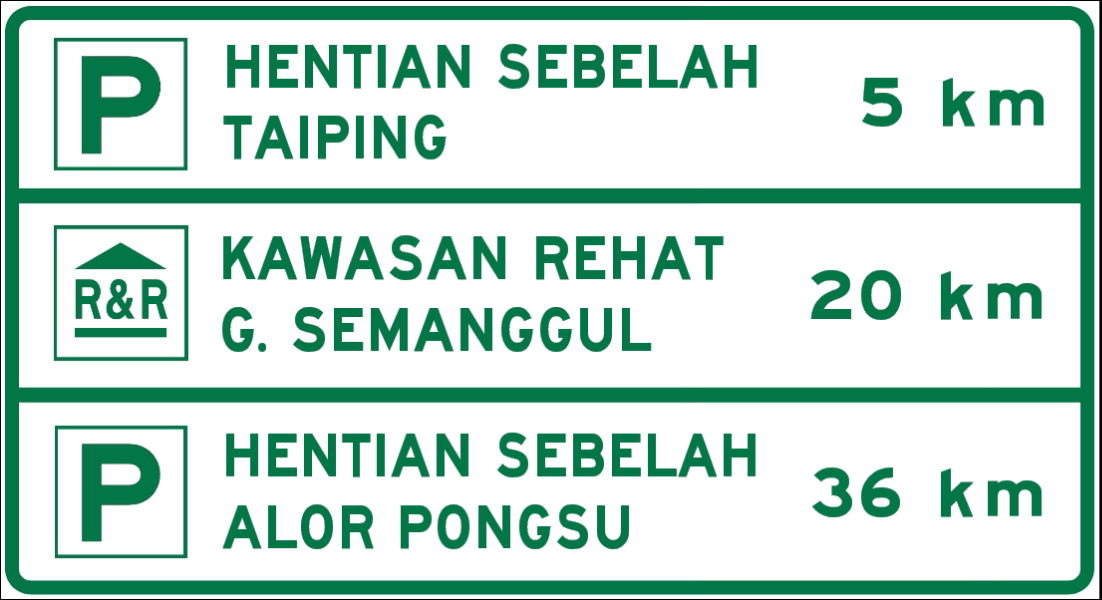
Old next parking and rest and service area signs

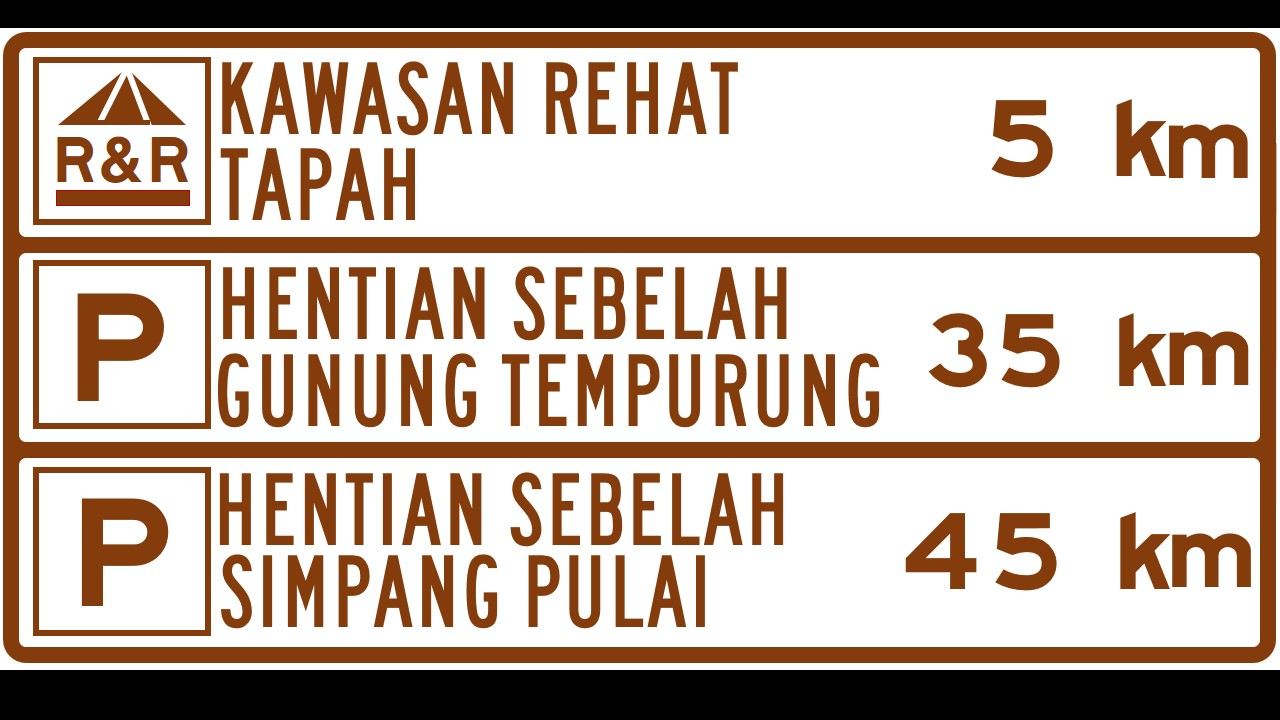
Old next parking and rest service area signs (Note: Gua Tempurung between Sungai Perak & Simpang Pulai Lay-By did not exist anymore because it was destroyed in 1996 after a landslide incident)

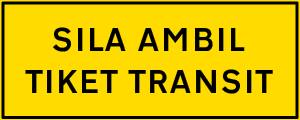
Please take a transit ticket sign (Note: transit ticket systems are no longer used on closed toll expressways)

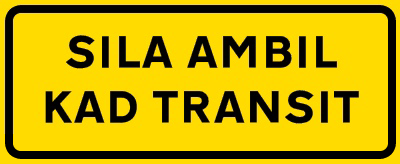
Please take a transit card sign (Note: transit ticket systems are no longer used on closed toll expressways)

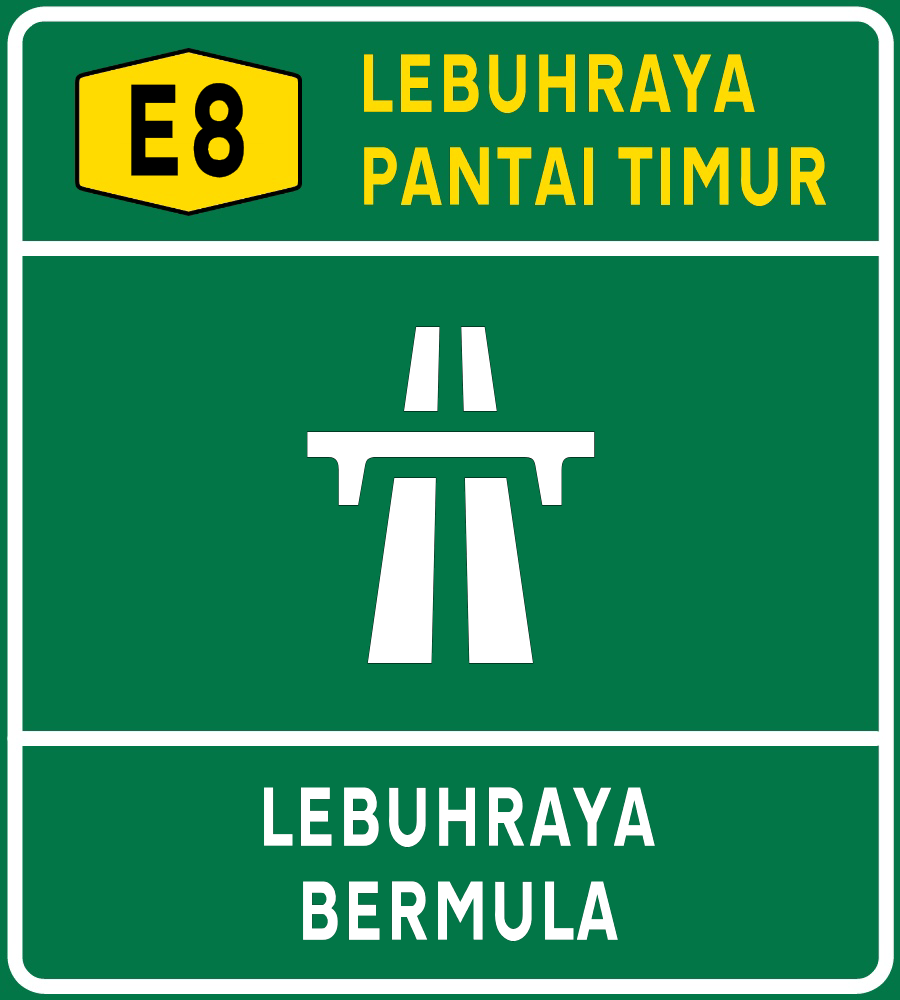
Old start of expressway sign

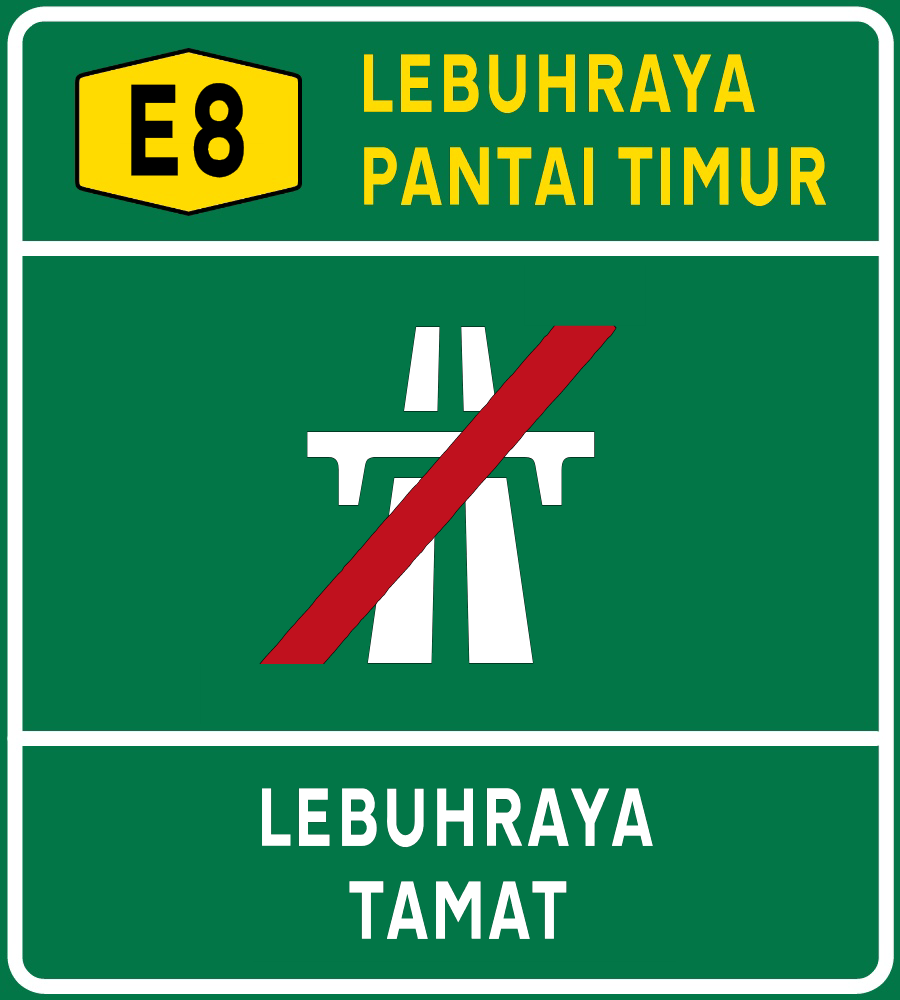
Old end of expressway sign

=== Non-tolled Federal, State and Municipal Roads ===
Malaysian road signs are blue and used for federal, state and municipal roads.

- Blue with white letters signs for major destinations
- Maroon with white letters signs for recreational places/tourist spot
- Blue with yellow letters signs for street names
- White with green letters signs for specific places/buildings
- Green with yellow letters signs for government buildings/institution
- White with blue letters signs for residential area

FT 1 Federal Roads
B34 State Roads

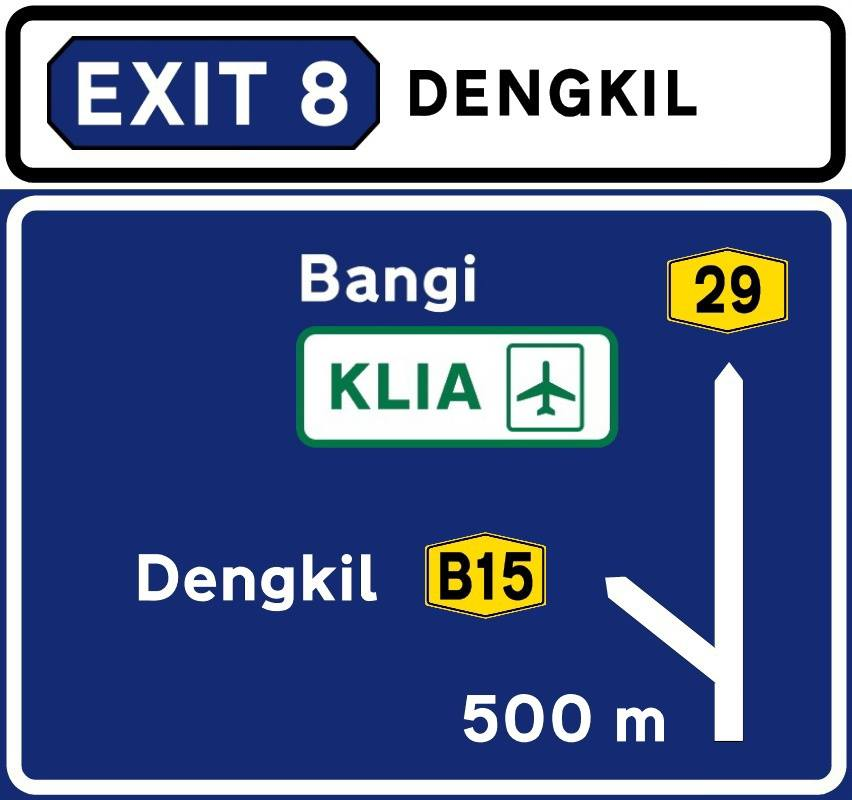
Highway interchange directional sign with exit number

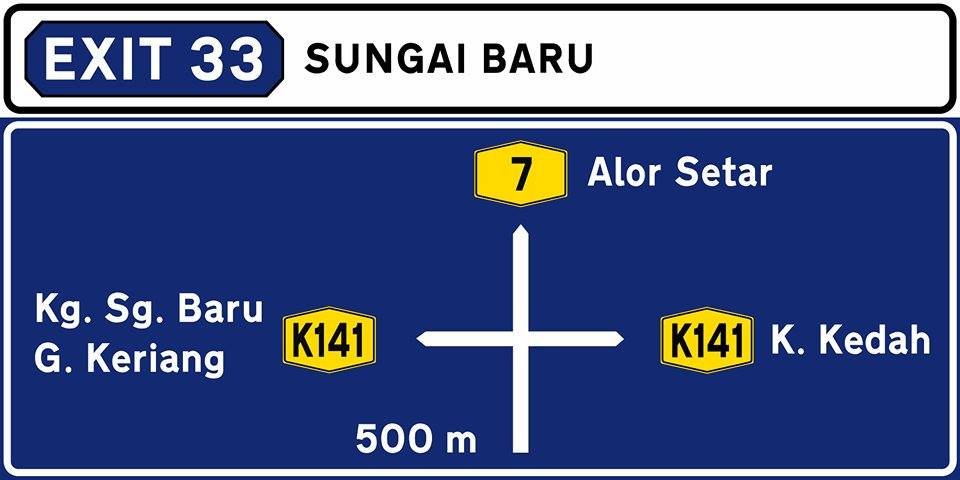
4-way intersection directional sign with exit number

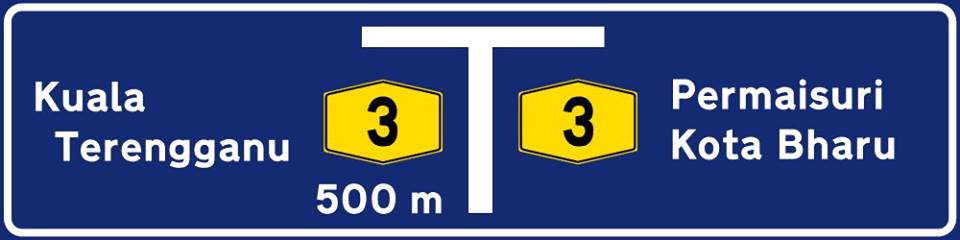
3-way intersection directional signs ahead

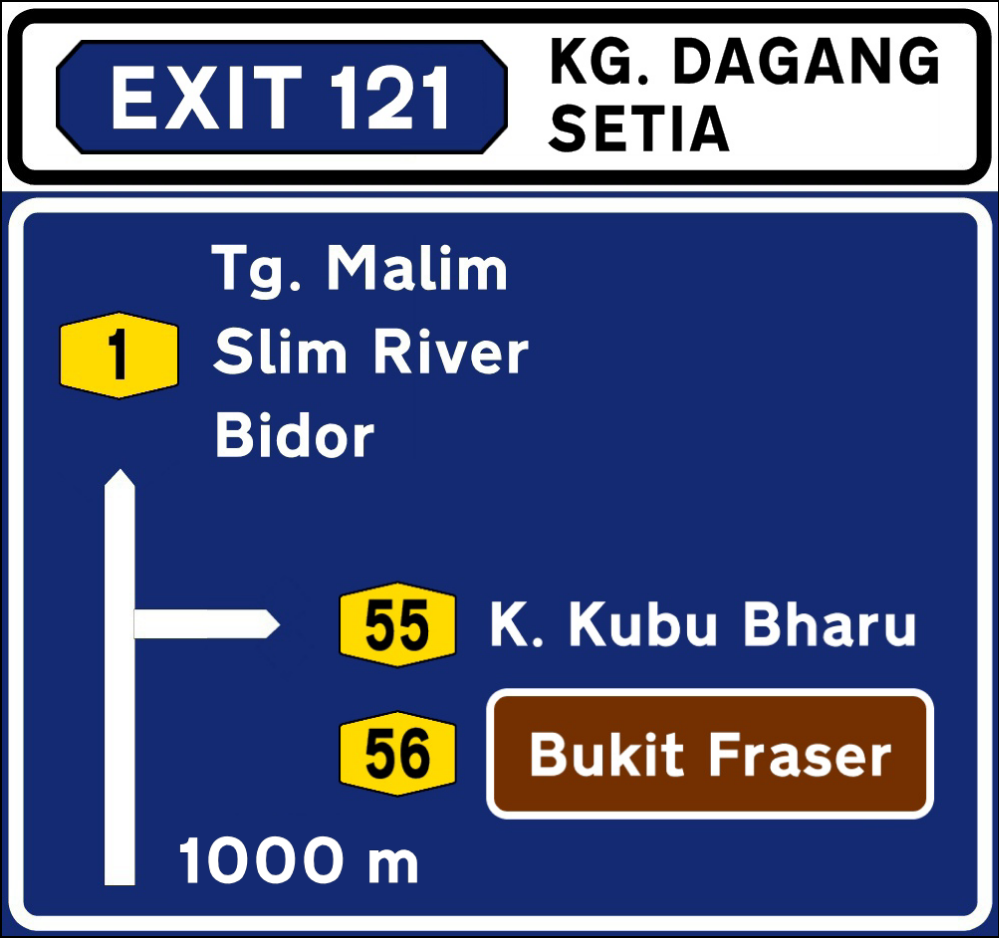
3-way intersection directional sign with exit number (1000 metres)

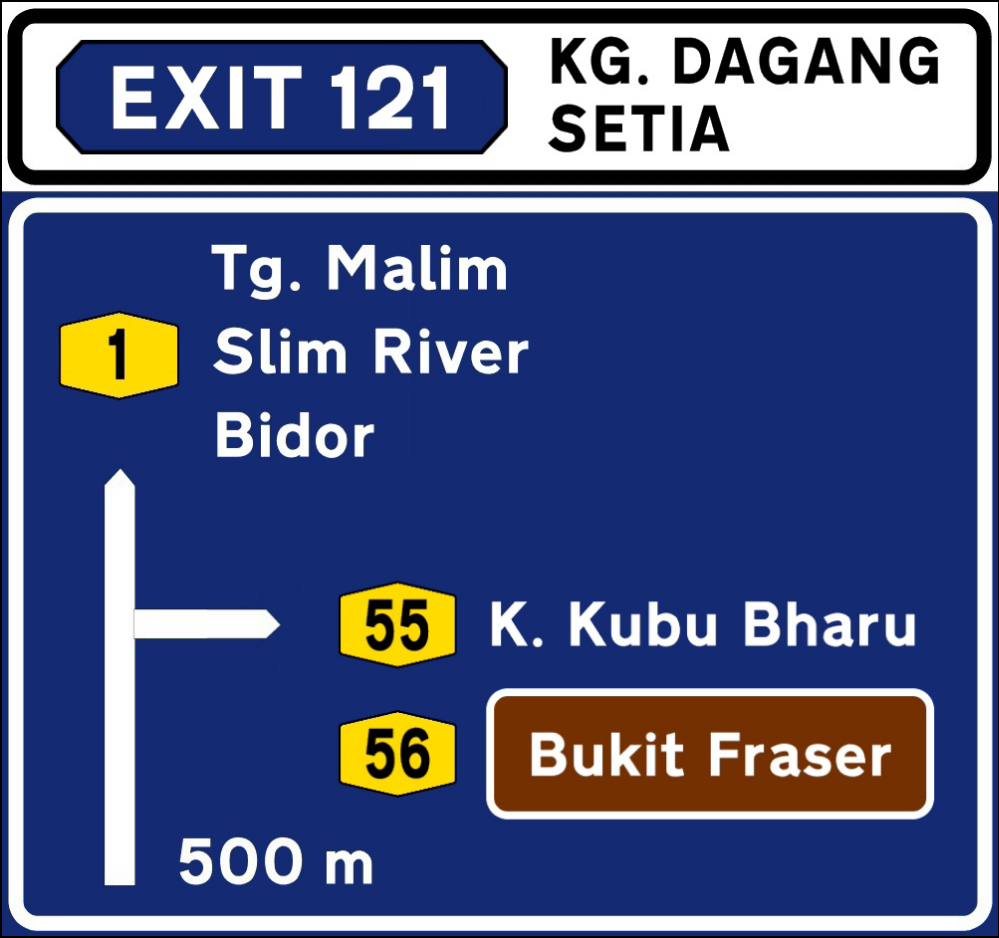
3-way intersection directional sign with exit number (500 metres)

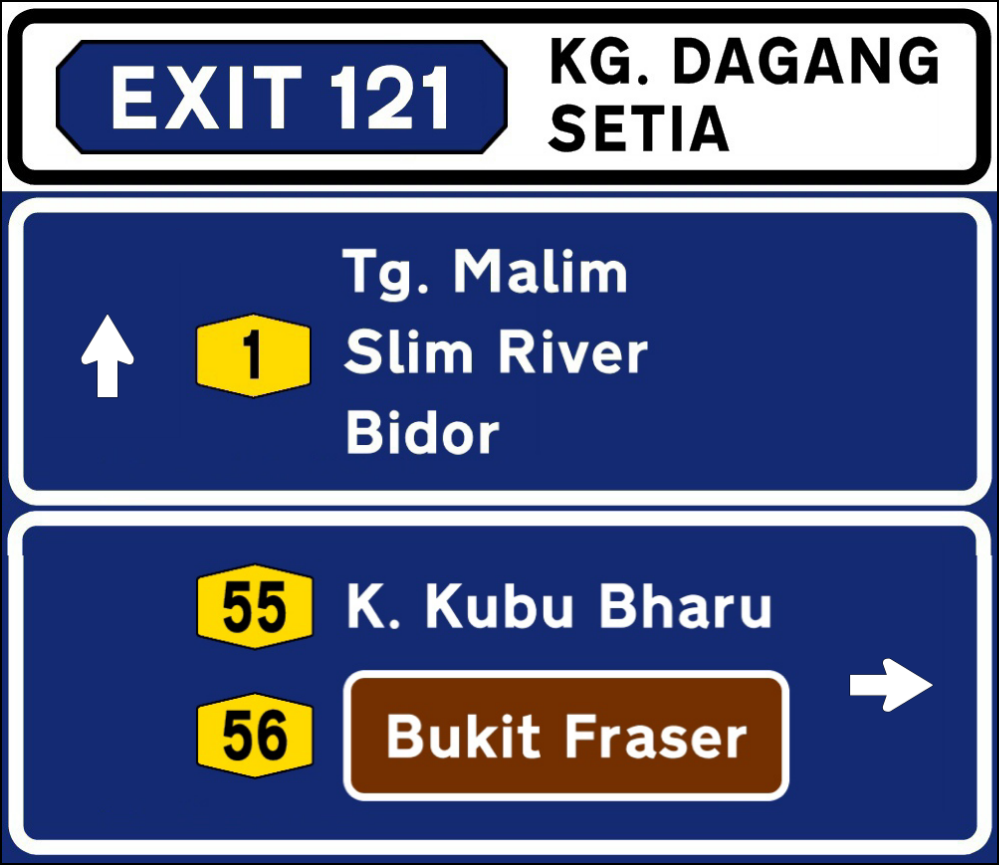
3-way intersection directional sign with exit number (100 metres)

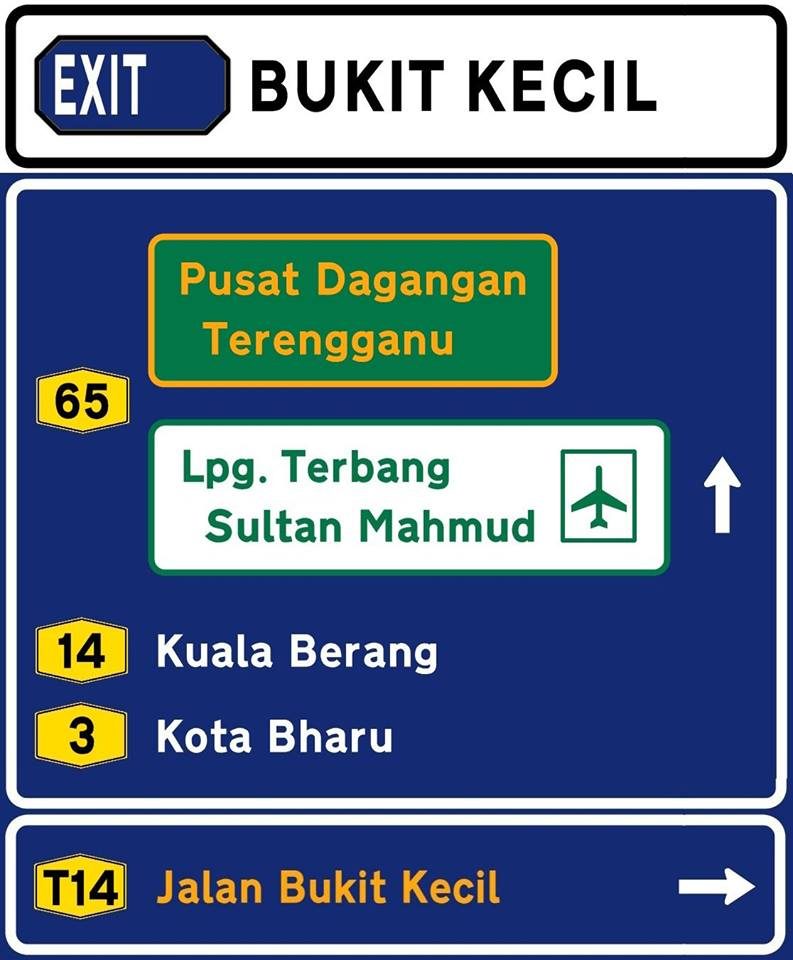
3-way intersection directional sign including institution facilities with exit number (100 metres)

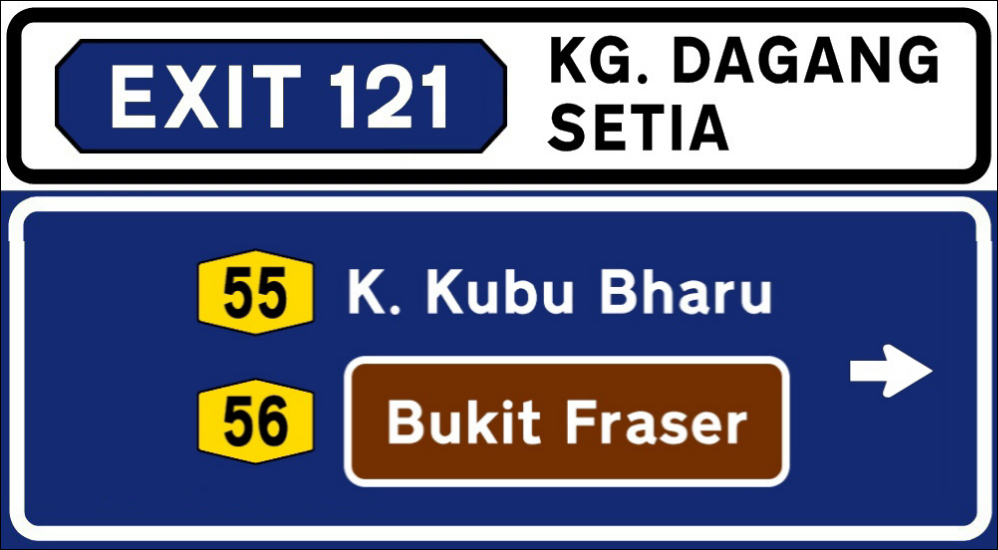
3-way intersection exit sign

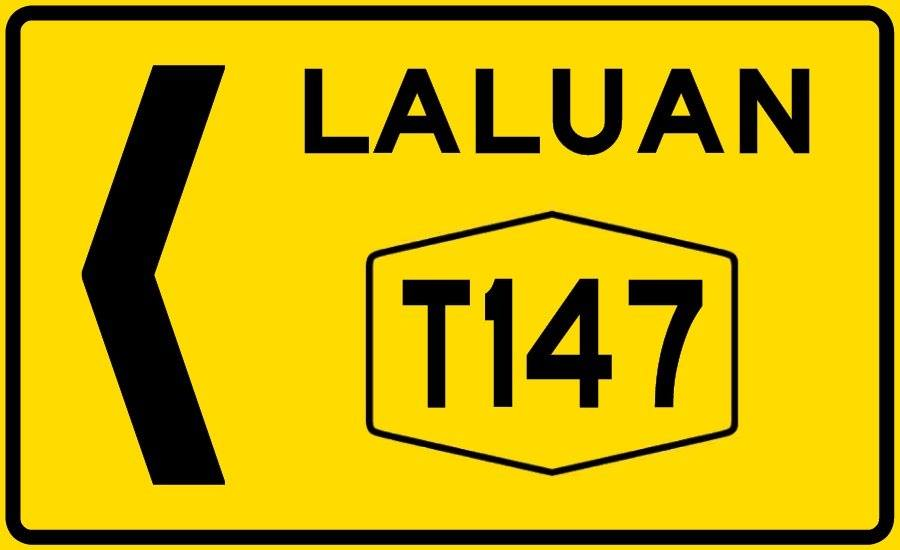
Route number direction sign

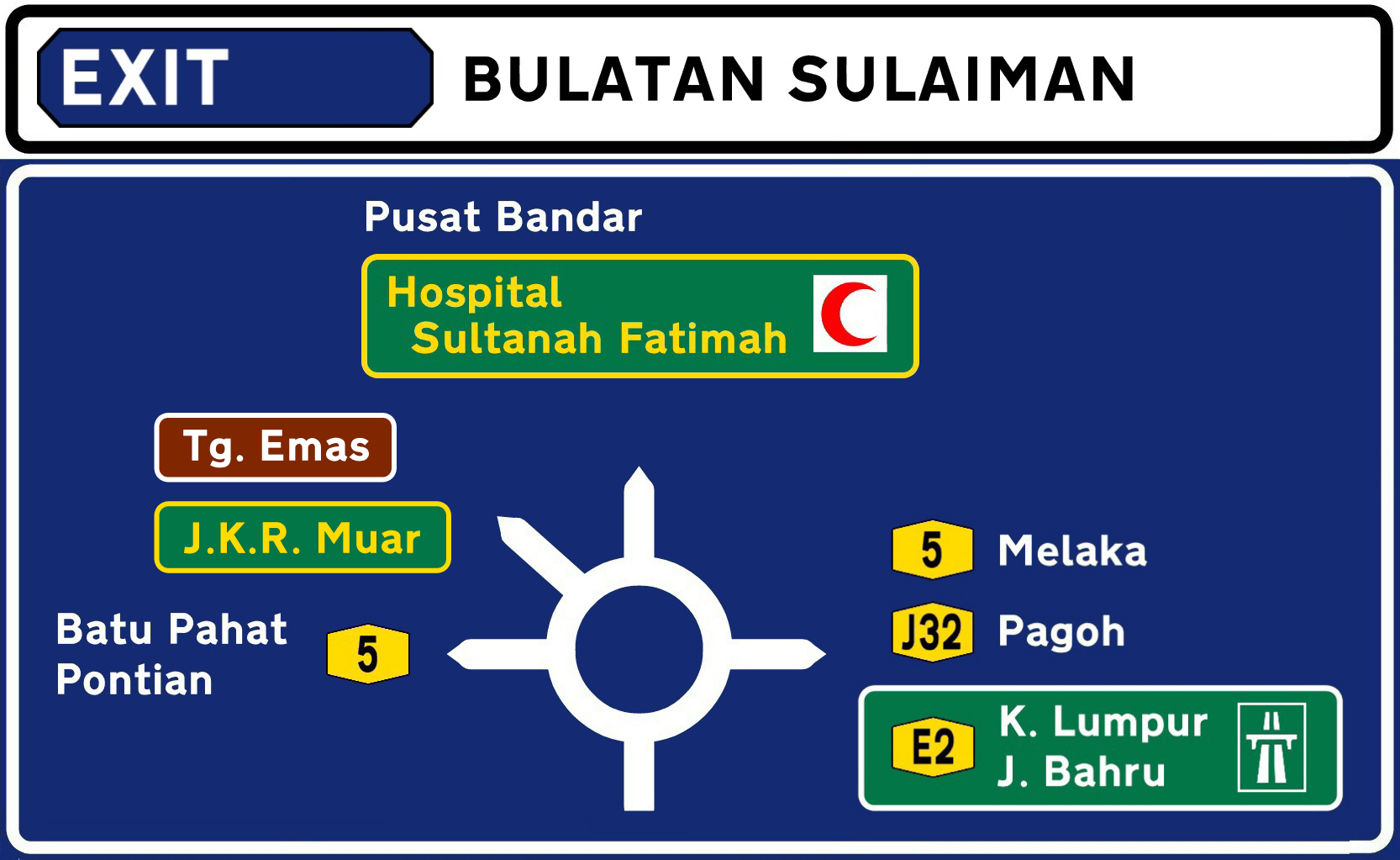
4-way roundabout directional sign with exit number

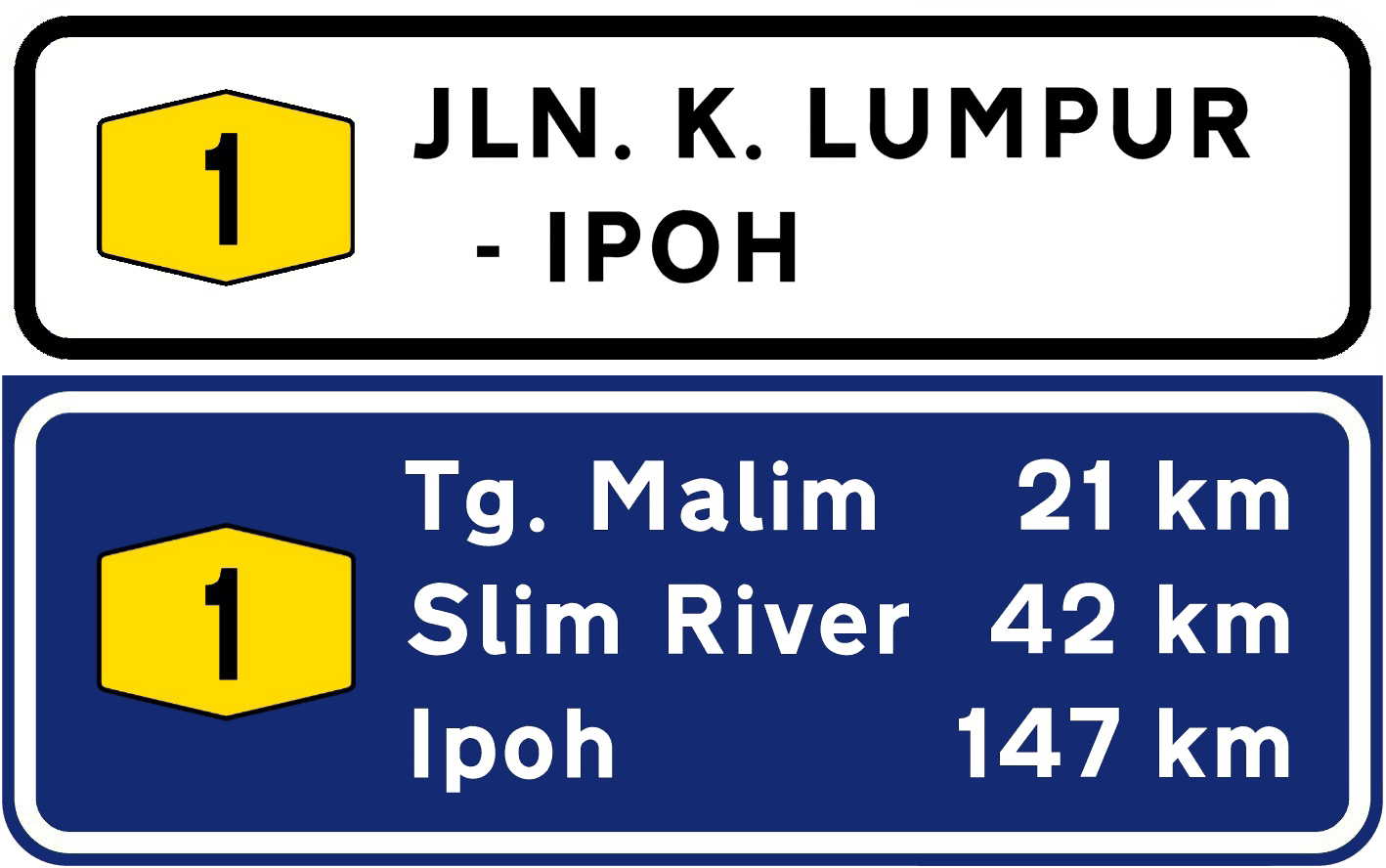
Federal Road distance sign with road name

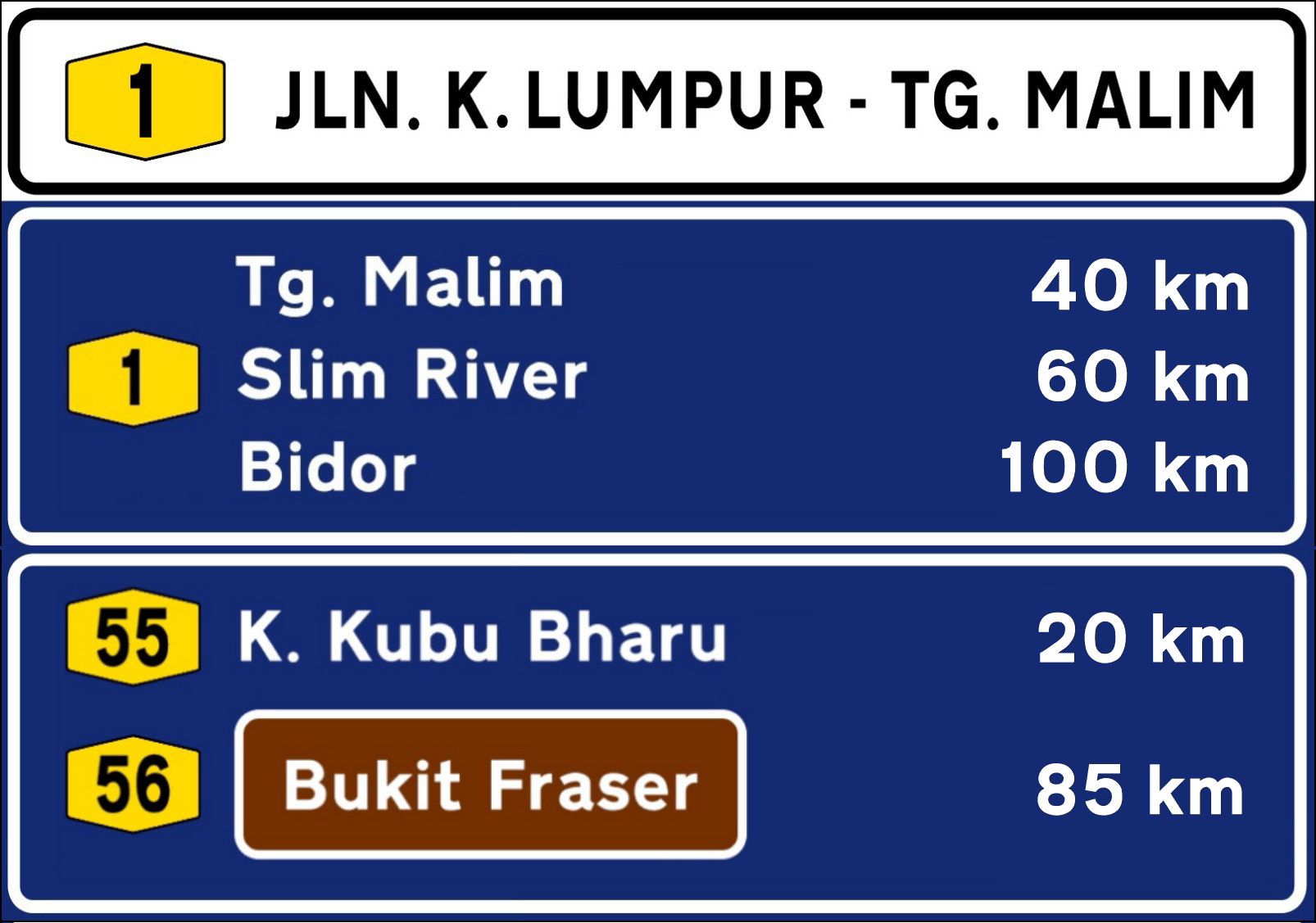
Federal Road distance sign with road name and other major road

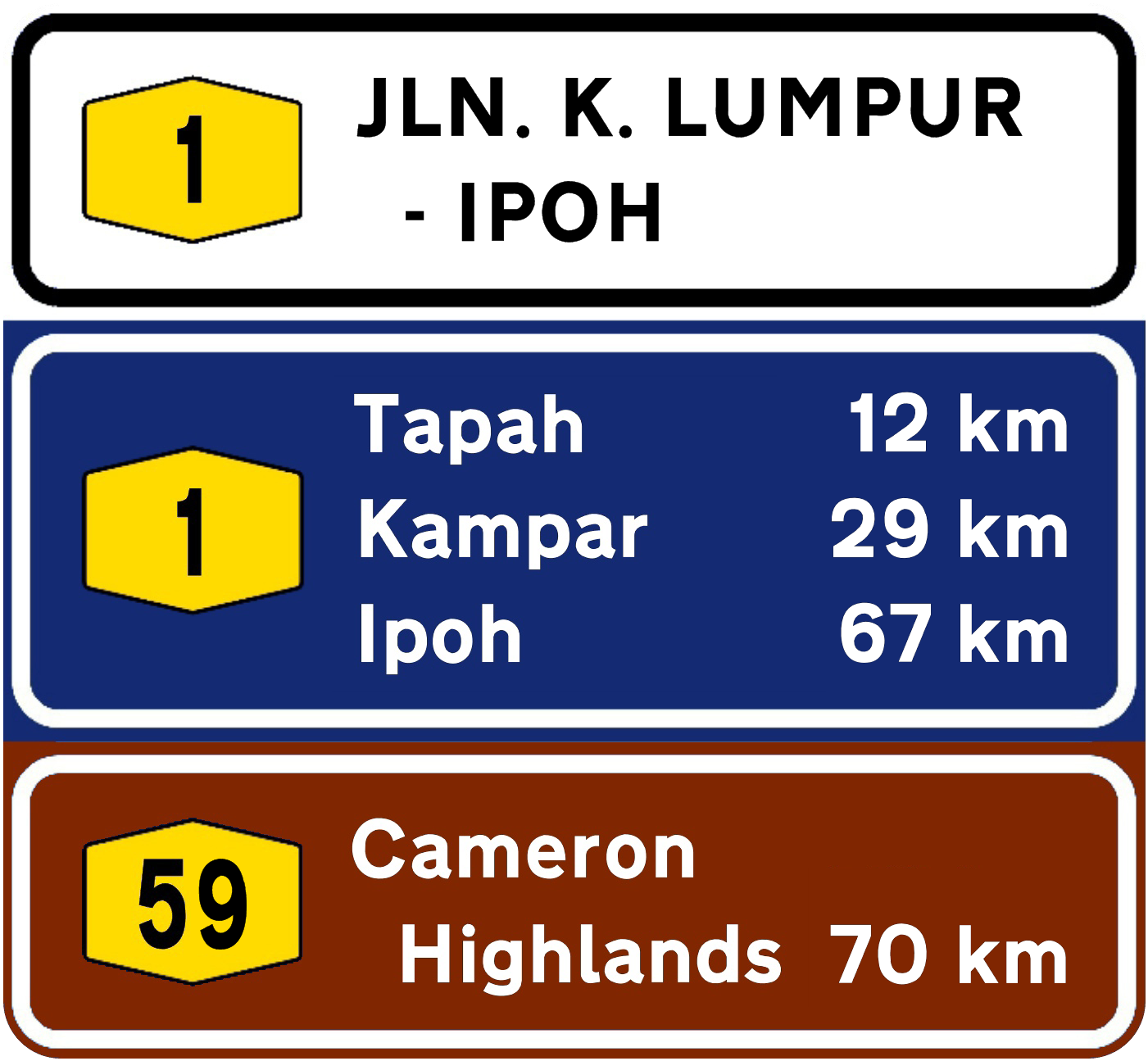
Federal Road distance sign with road name and tourist destination

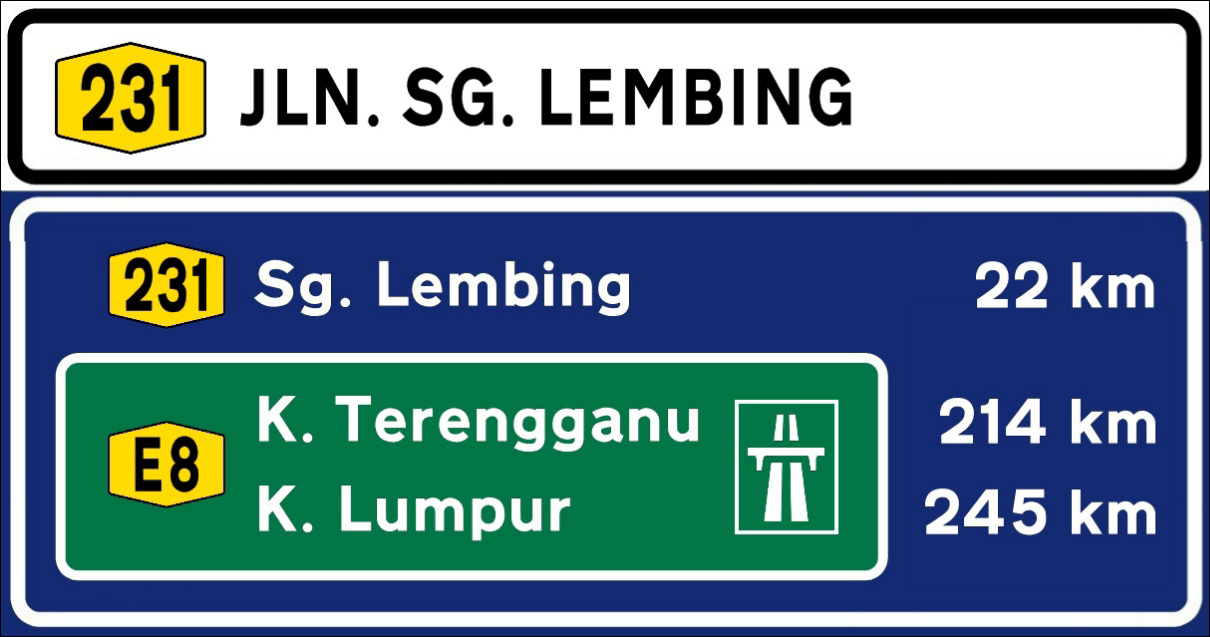
Federal Road distance sign with road name and route to expressway

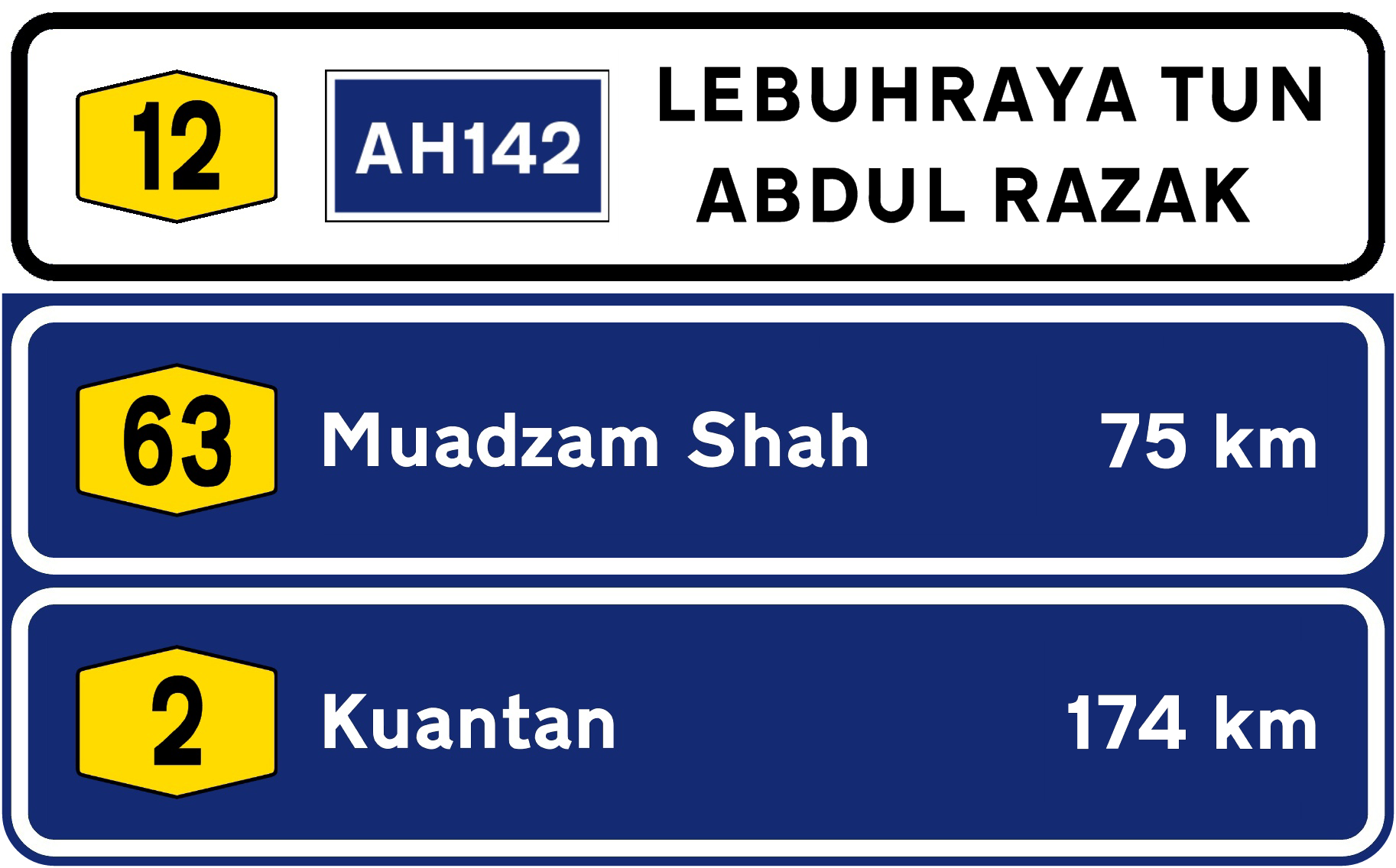
Federal Road distance sign with road name and Asian Highway route shield

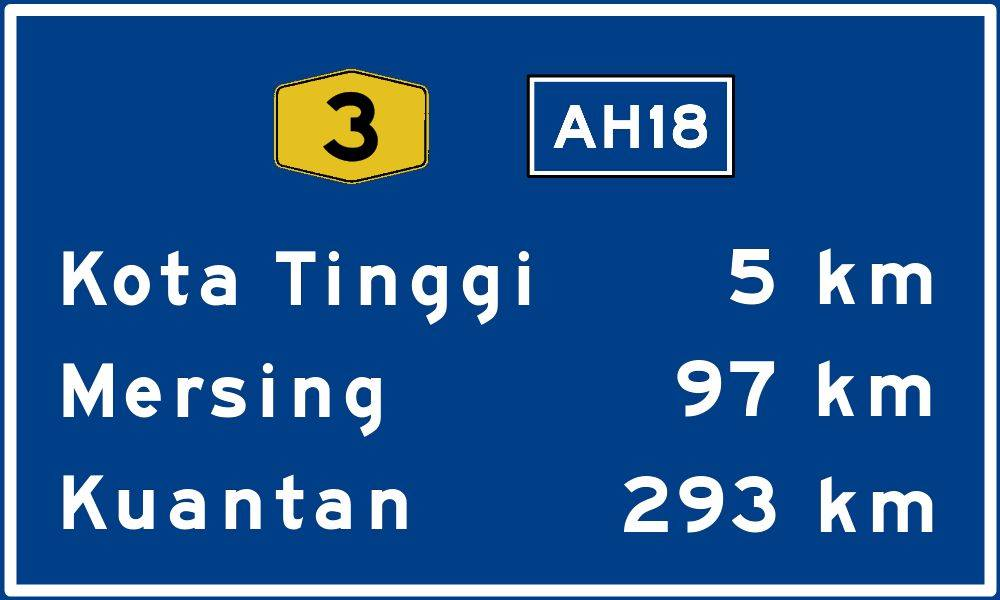
Federal Road distance sign with Asian Highway route shield

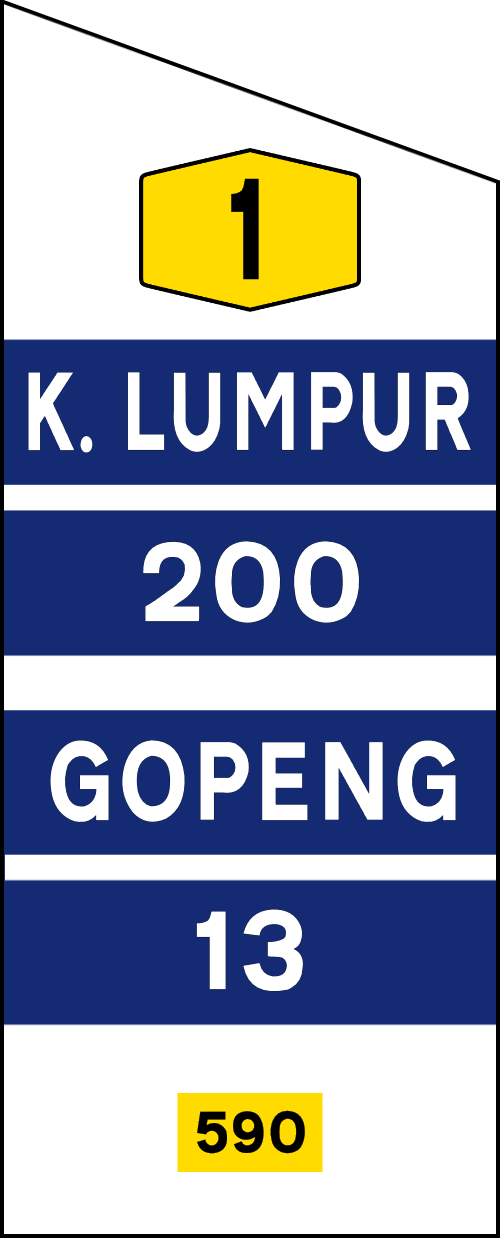
Primary milestones

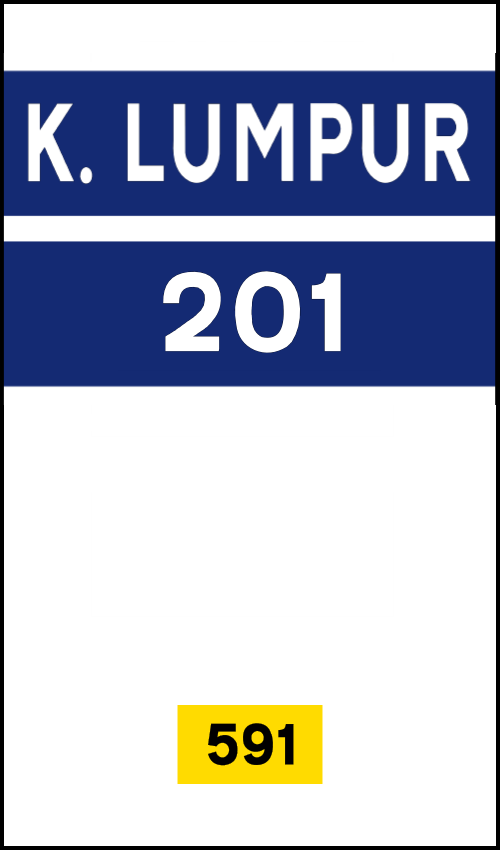
Secondary milestones

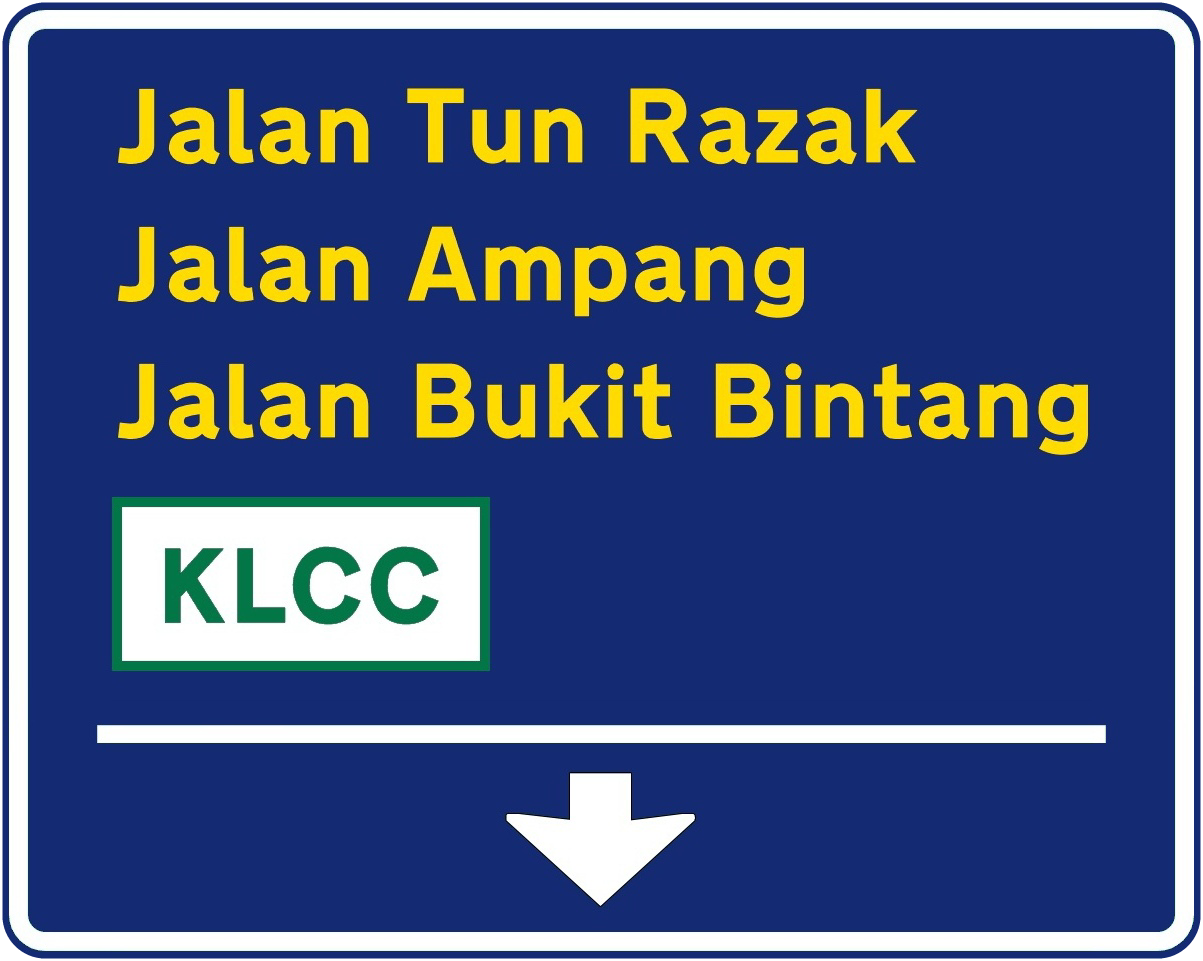
Name of roads - gantry sign

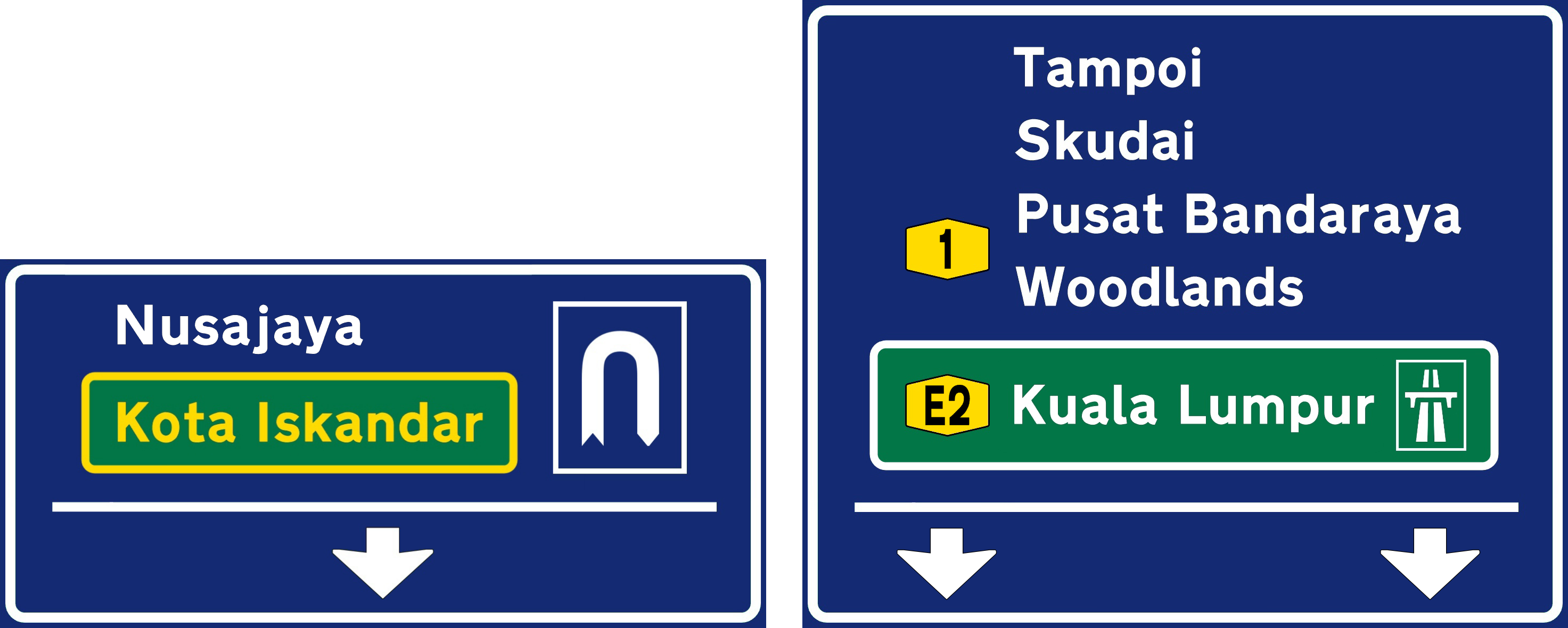
Federal Route gantry sign

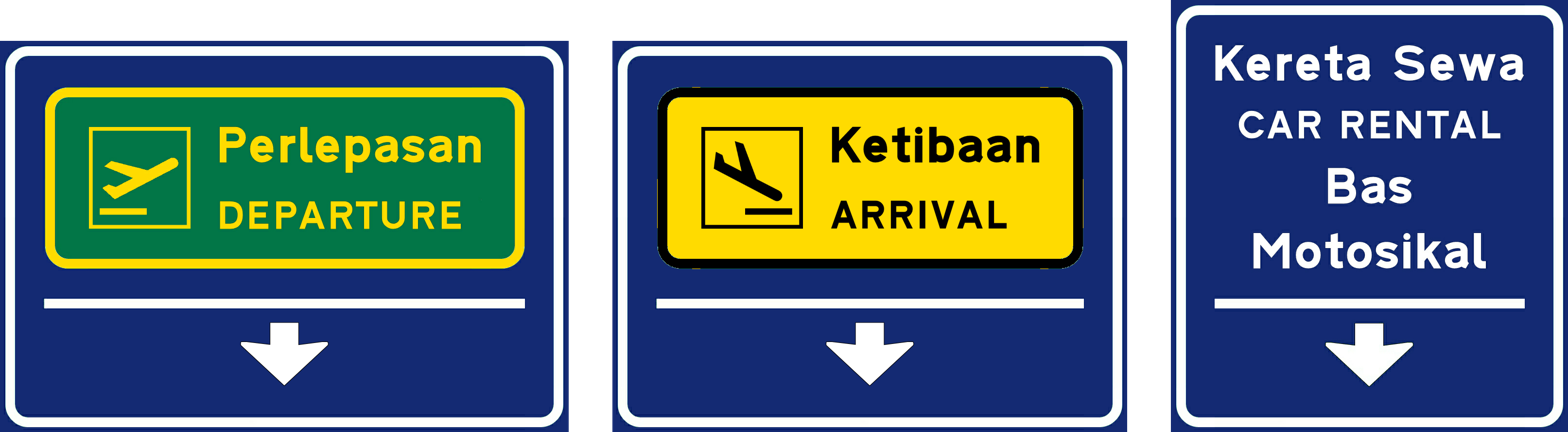
Airport gantry sign

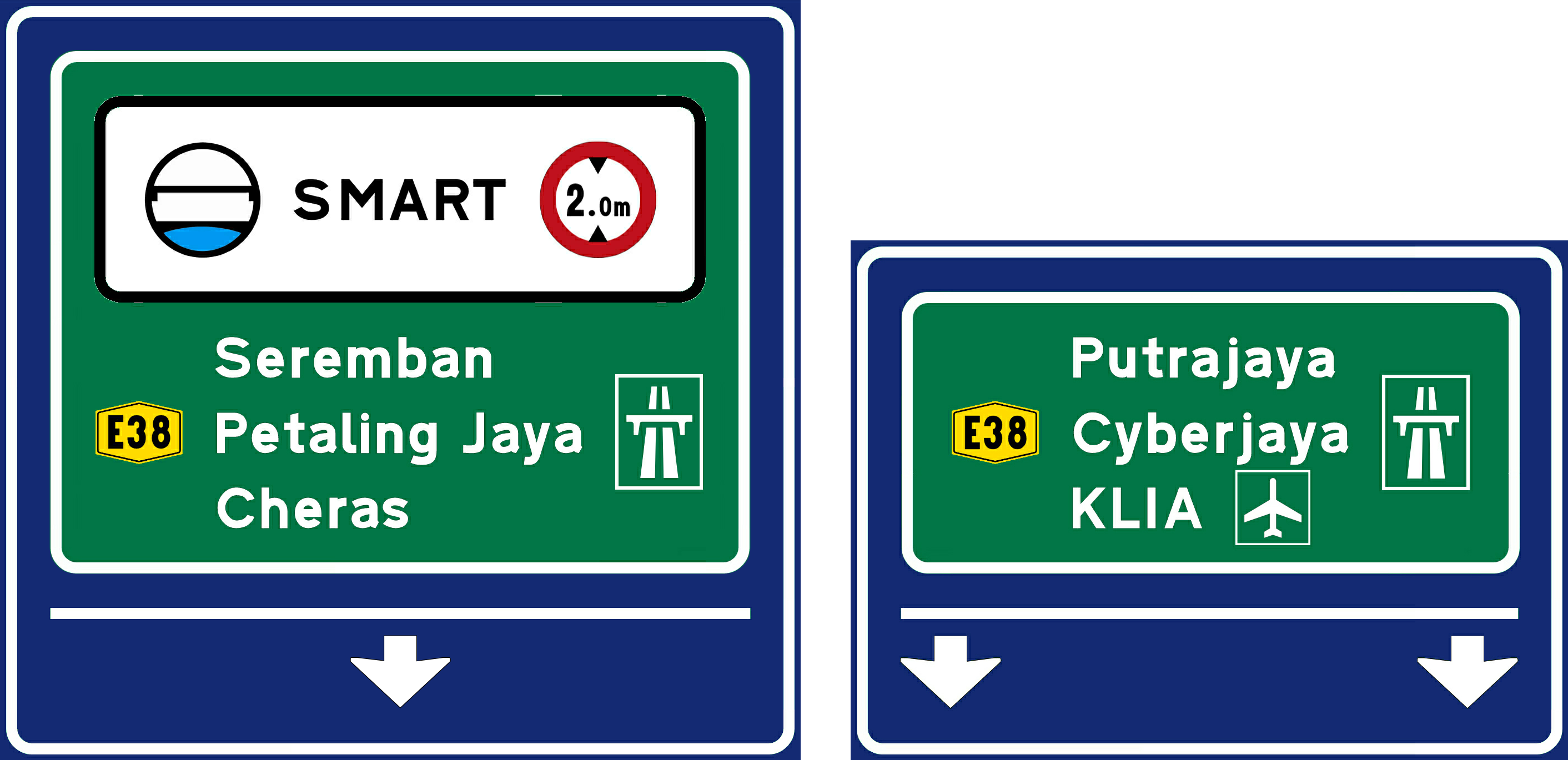
Gantry sign towards SMART tunnel

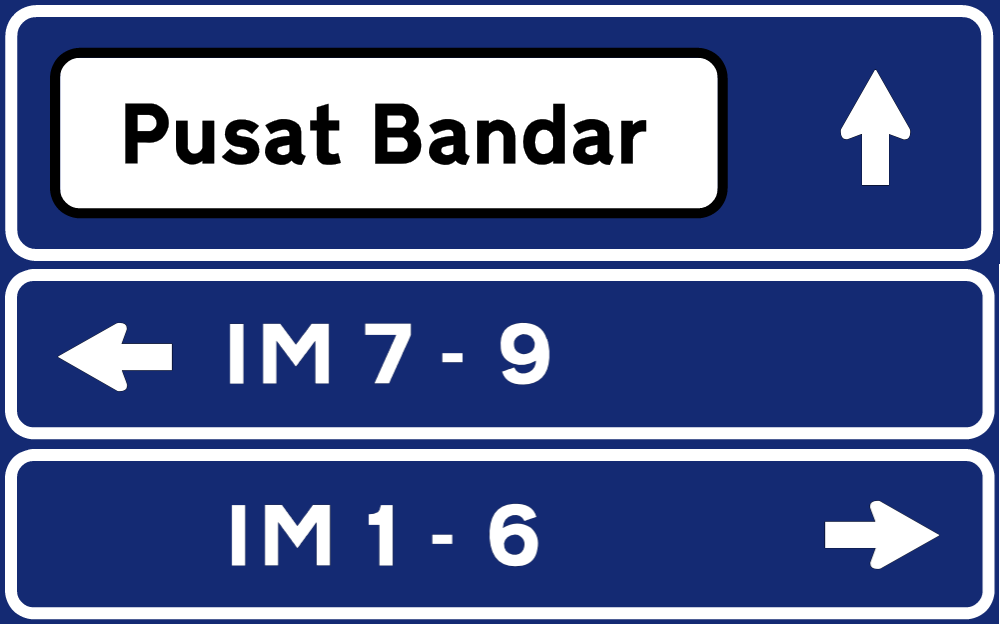
4-way intersection directions to town centre

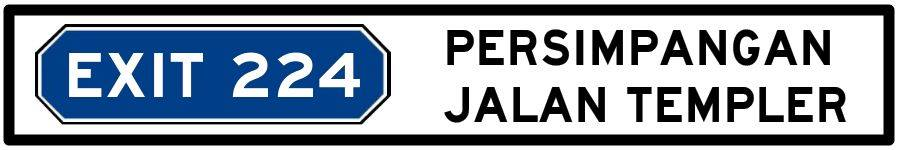
White with Black letters for exit signs

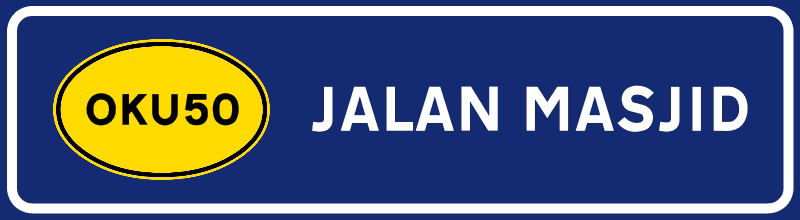
Road name signs with route shield (local authority)

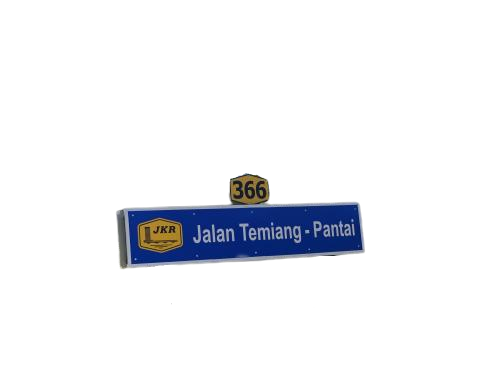
Road name signs with route shield (JKR federal routes)

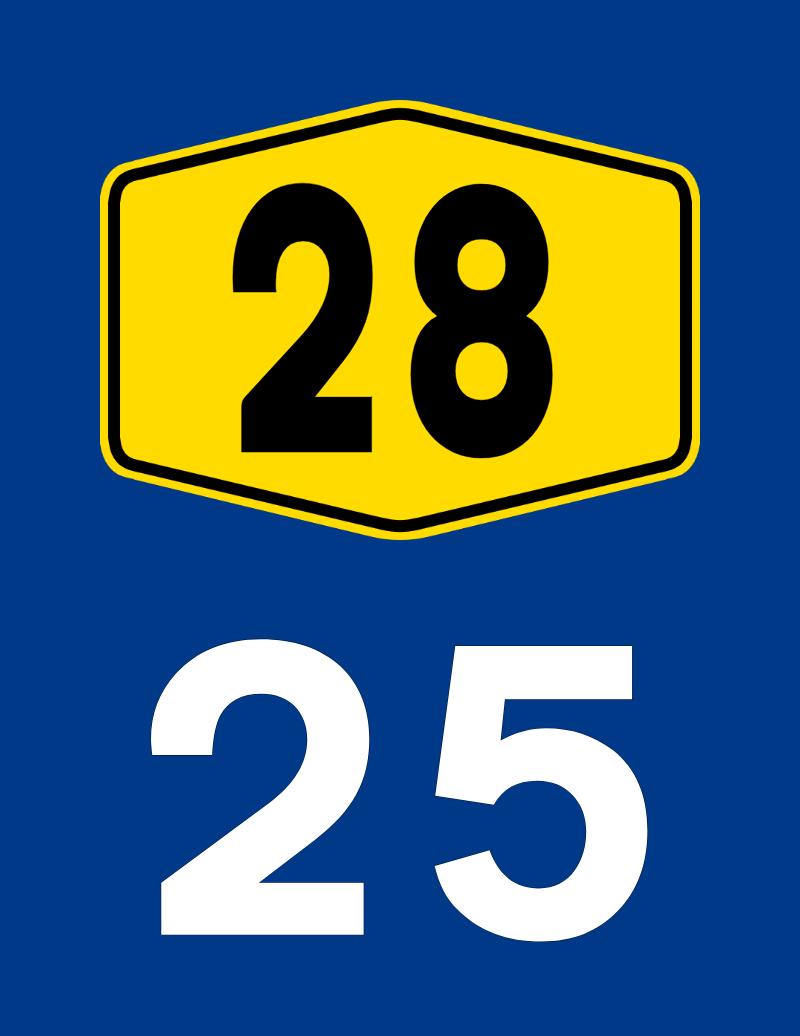
Kilometre markers for federal roads, usually found on non-tolled highways

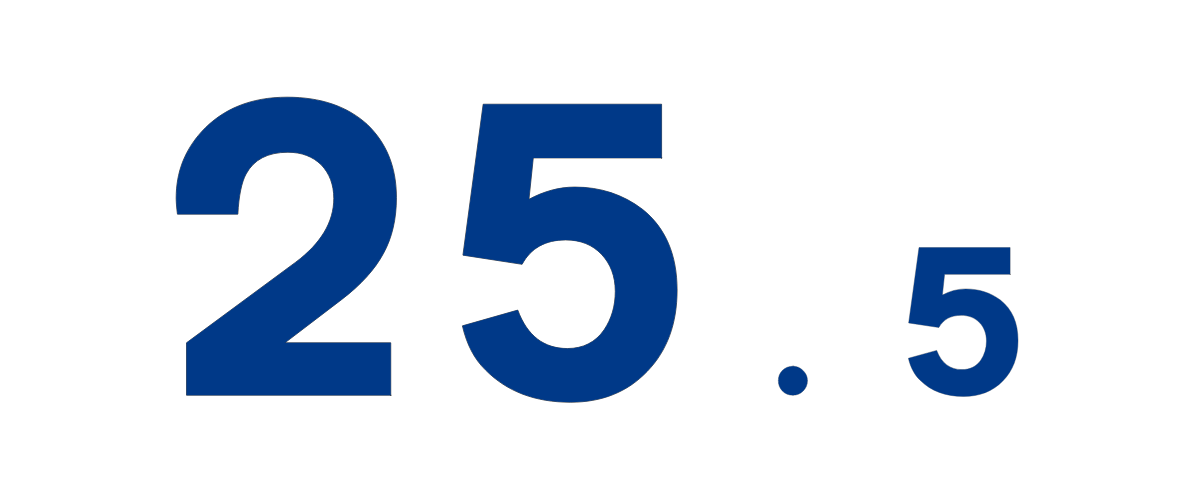
Hectometre markers for federal roads, usually found on non-tolled highways

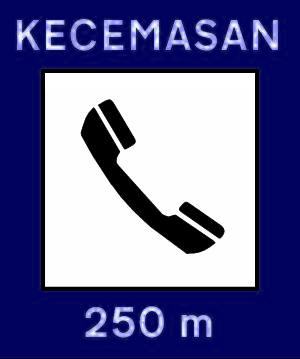
Emergency phone in 250 metres sign on federal roads, mostly found on non-tolled highways and main roads

==== Old format ====
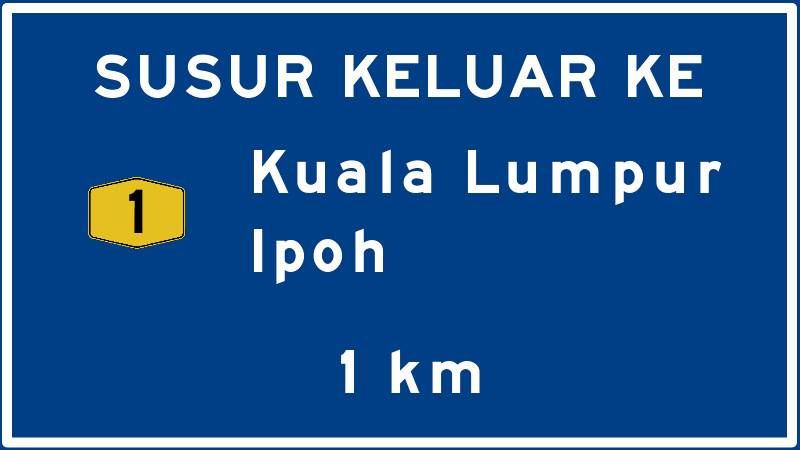
Exit to next destinations (usually for highways)

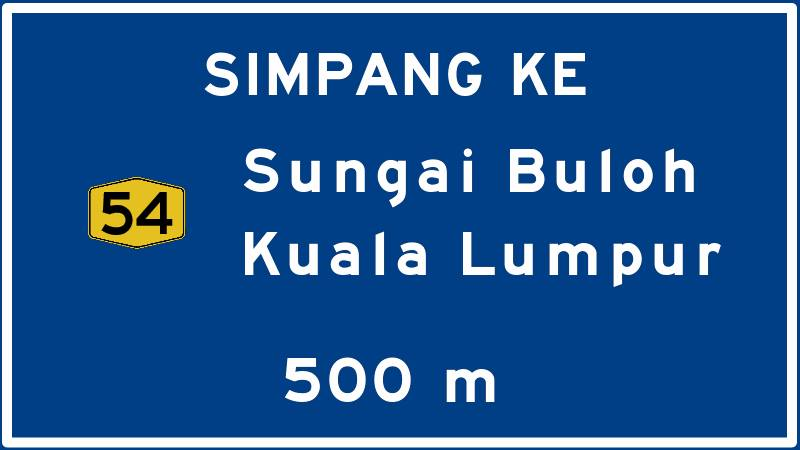
Intersection to next destinations (usually for trunk roads)

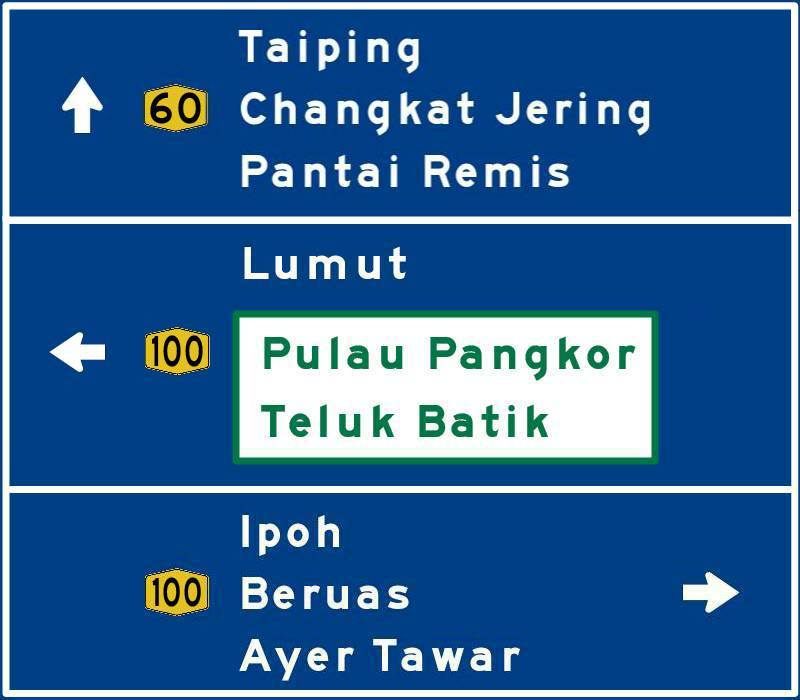
4-way intersection directions

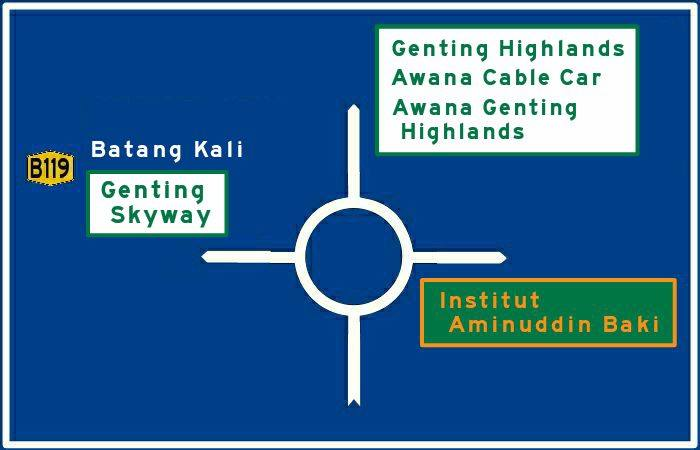
4-way roundabout directions

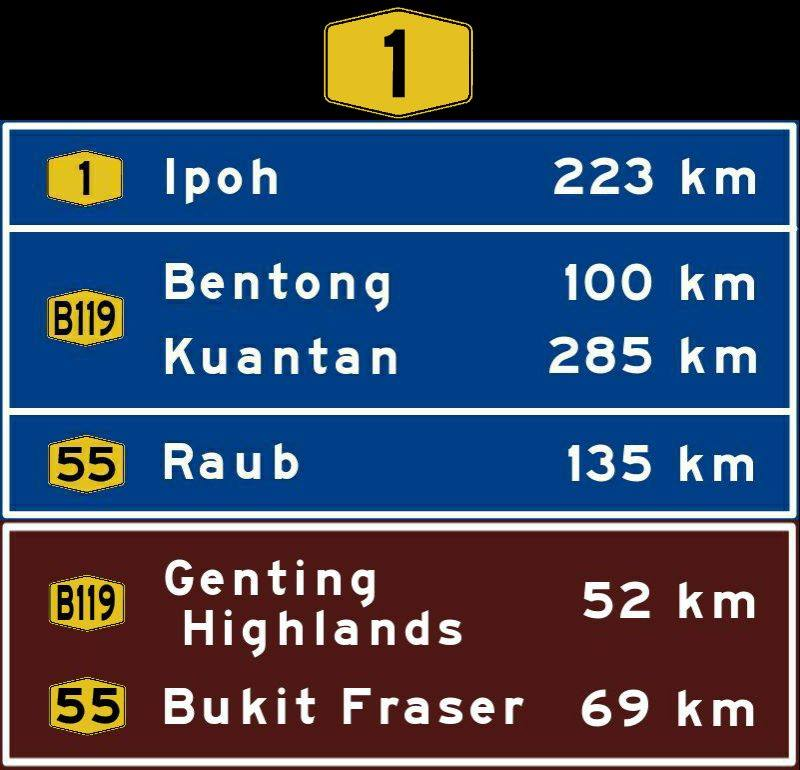
Places distance

=== Asian Highway route signs ===
As part of the Asian Highway Network.

Asian Highway route shield

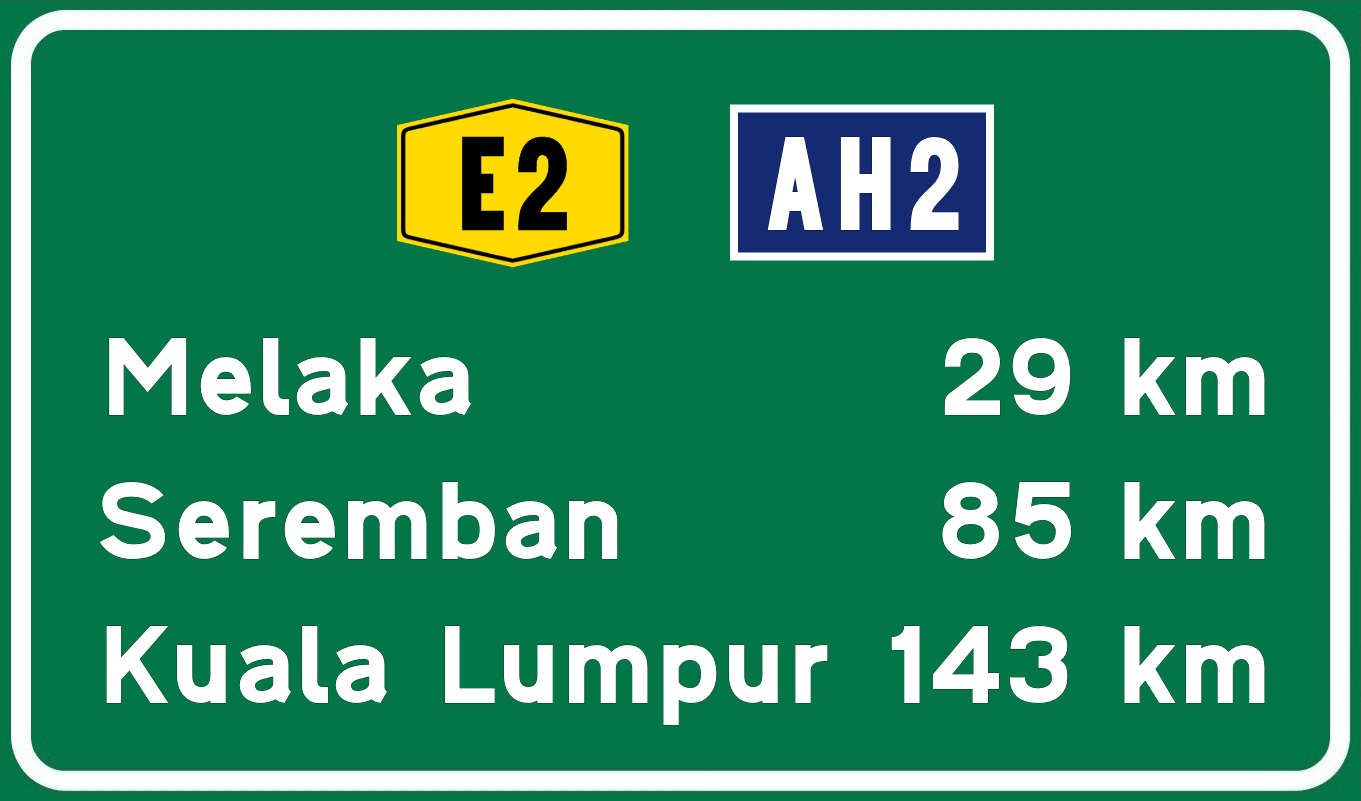
Expressway distance sign with Asian Highway route shield

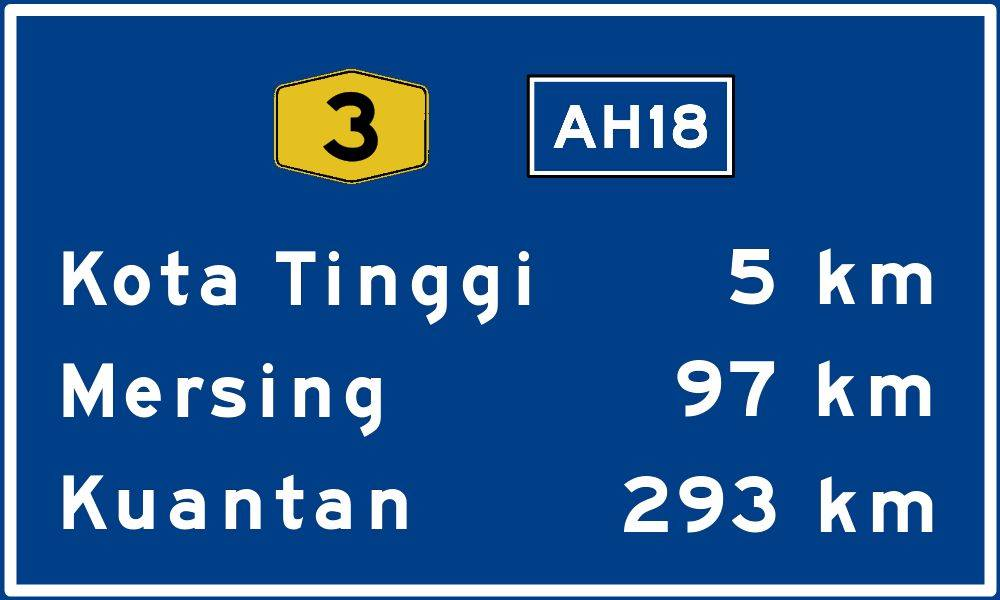
Federal Road distance sign with Asian Highway route shield

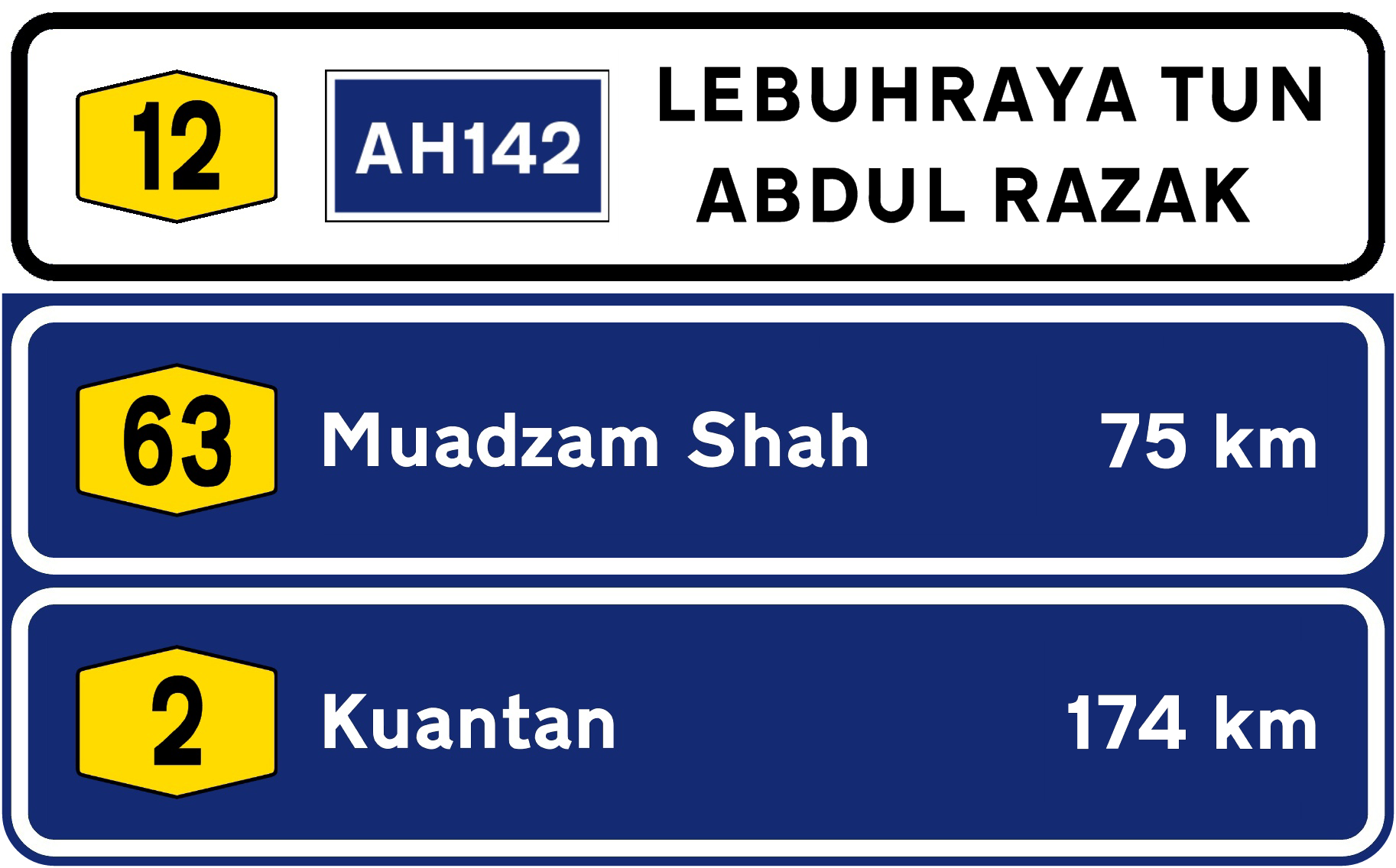
Federal Road distance sign with road name and Asian Highway route shield

=== Border signs ===
Border signs in Malaysia are green for international and state and blue for district.

==== International border signs ====
International border signboard

==== State border signs ====
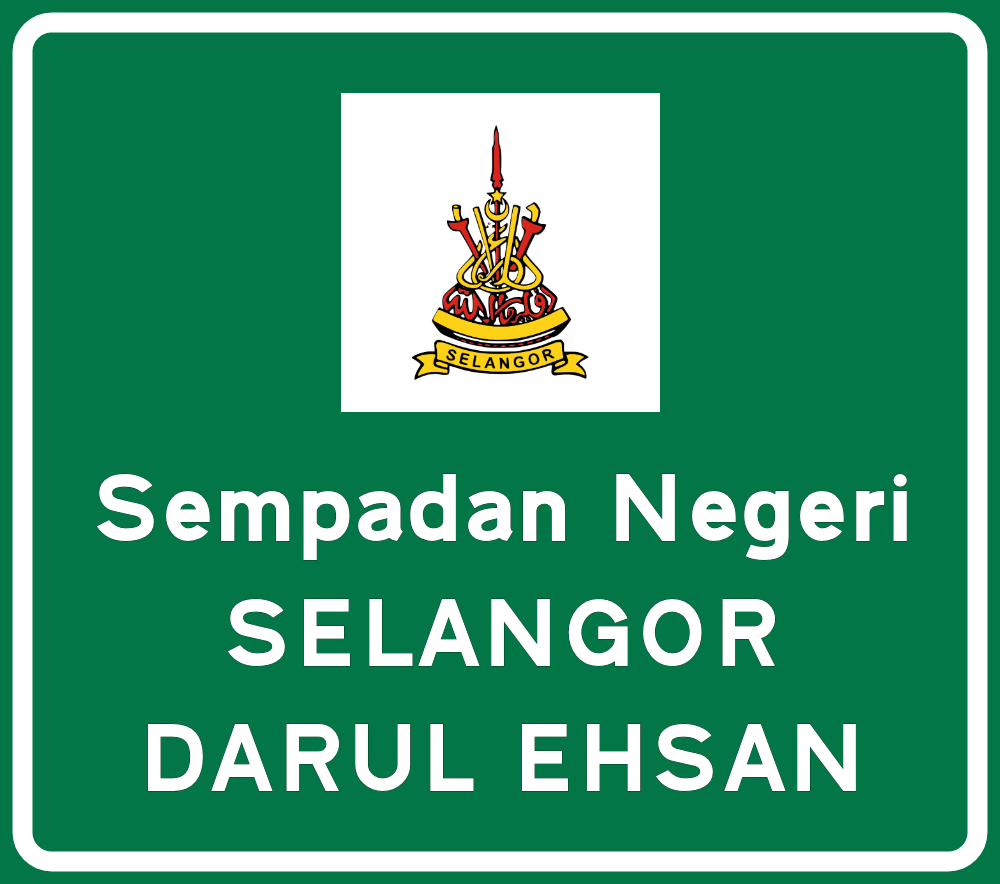
Selangor state border signboard

Federal Territory of Kuala Lumpur border signboard

==== District border signs ====
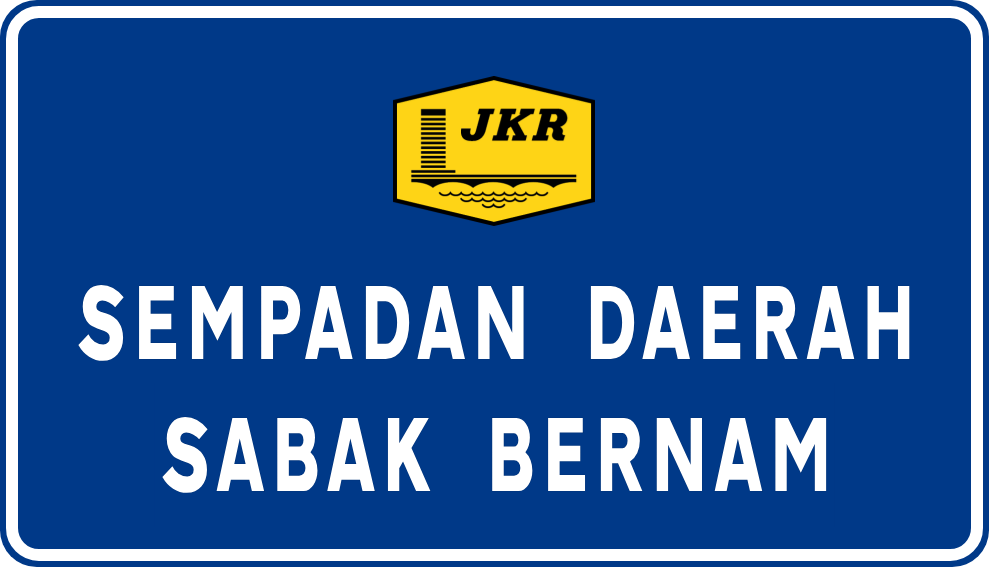
Sabak Bernam district border signboard with JKR logo

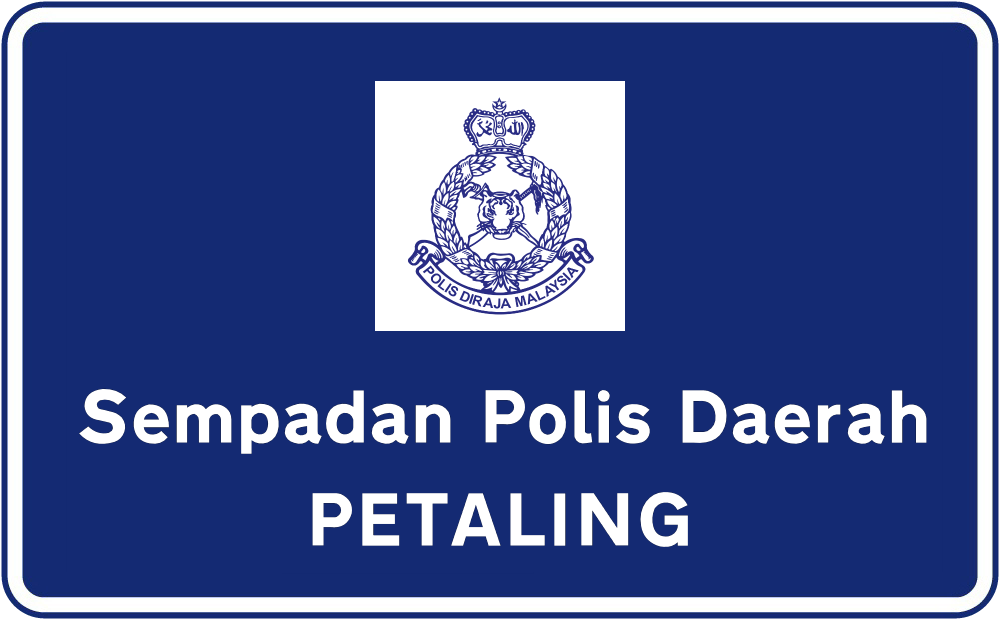
Petaling police district border signboard with Royal Malaysia Police logo.

==== JKR routes maintenance border limit signs ====
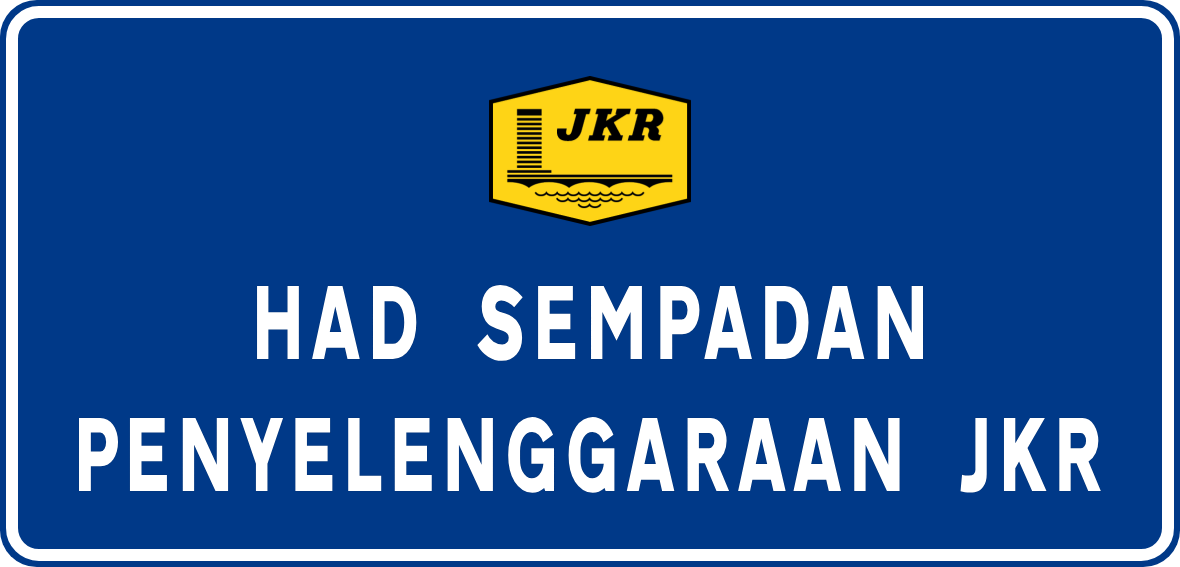
Malaysian Public Works Department (JKR) maintenance border limit

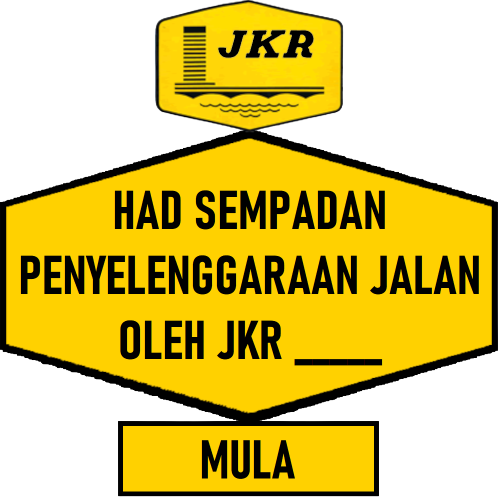
Malaysian Public Works Department (JKR) Maintenance Border Limit (Starts here)

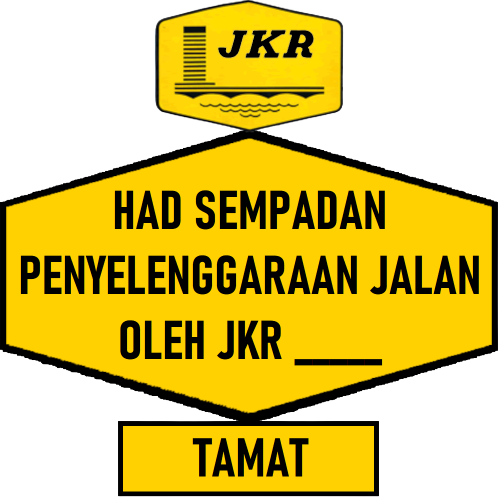
Malaysian Public Works Department (JKR) Maintenance Border Limit (Ends here)

=== Institution and building signs ===
These are other important signs in Malaysia such as government institutions and tourist destinations.

- White with black letters for towns and other settlements.
- Green with orange letters for government institutions.
- White with green letters and Maroon with white letters for tourist destinations.
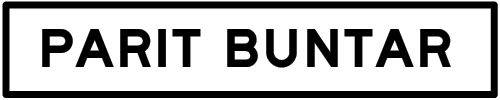
Entering town and settlements signs

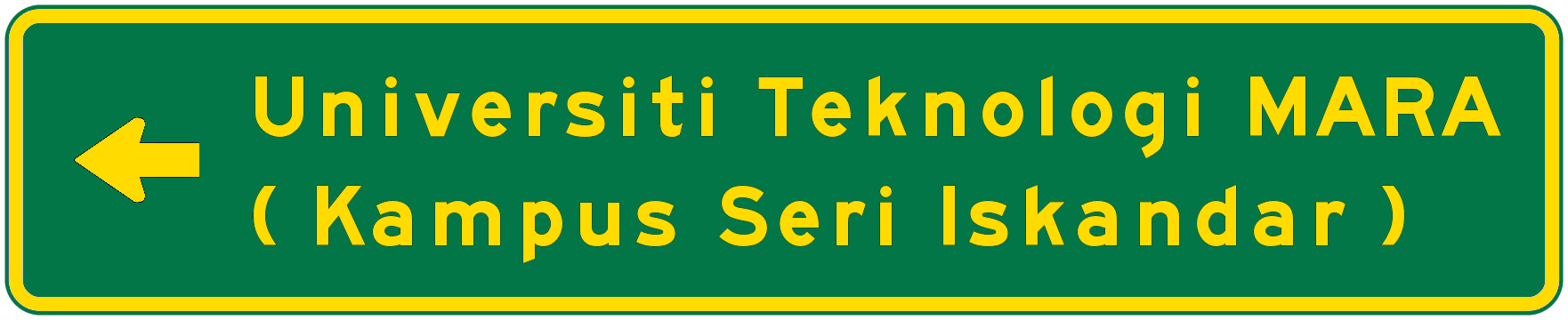
Government institutions (option 1)

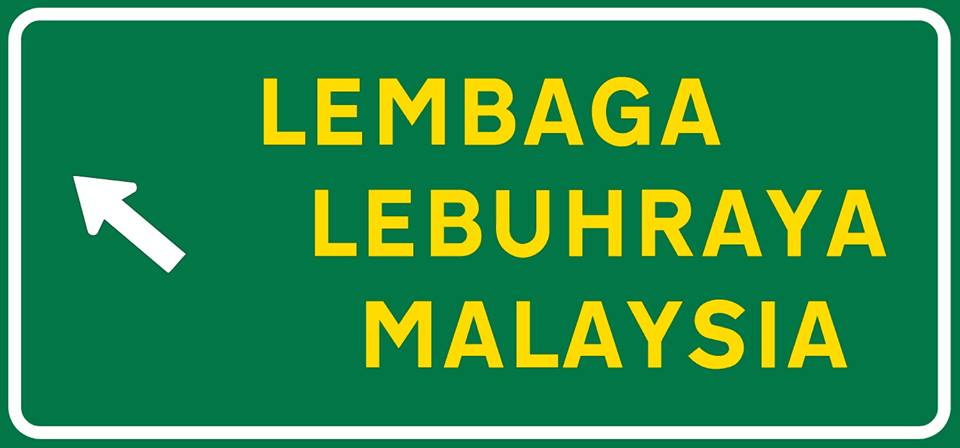
Government institutions (option 2)

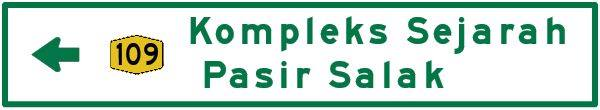
Tourist destinations (option 1)

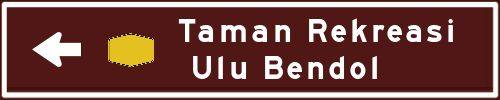
Tourist destinations (option 2)

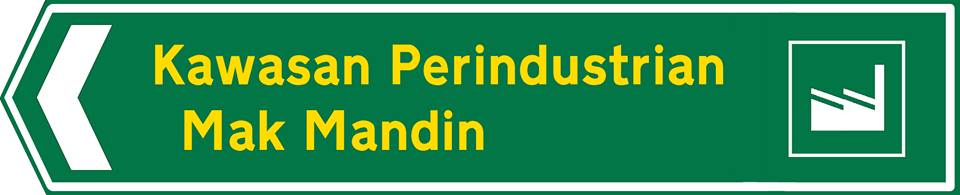
Industrial area direction sign

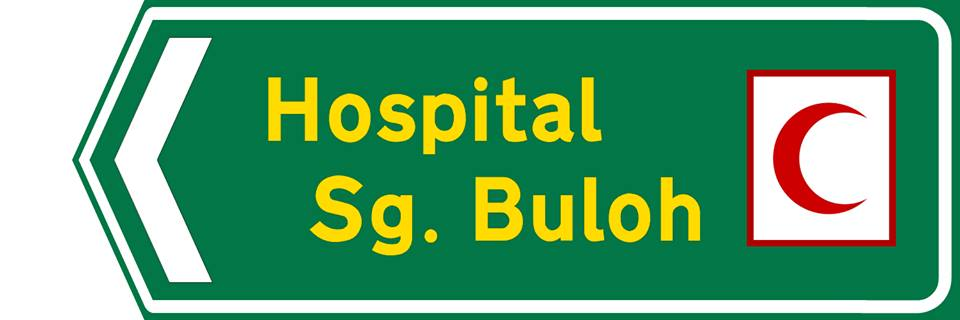
Hospital direction sign

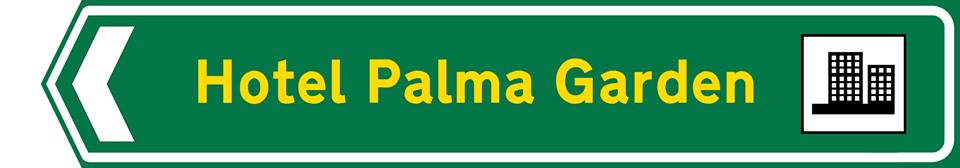
Hotel direction sign

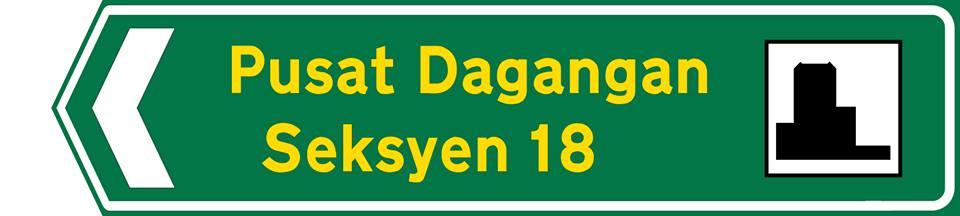
Commercial centre direction sign

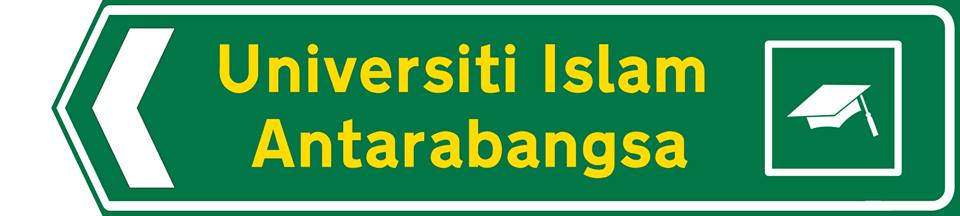
University direction sign

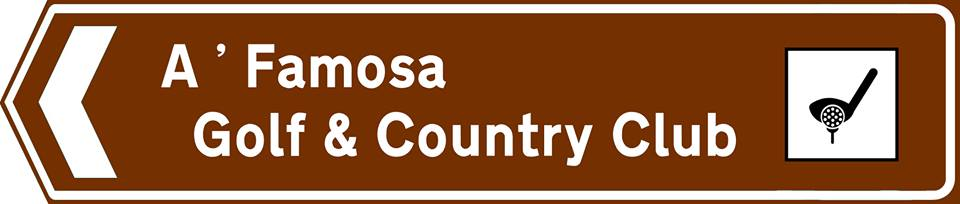
Golf course direction sign

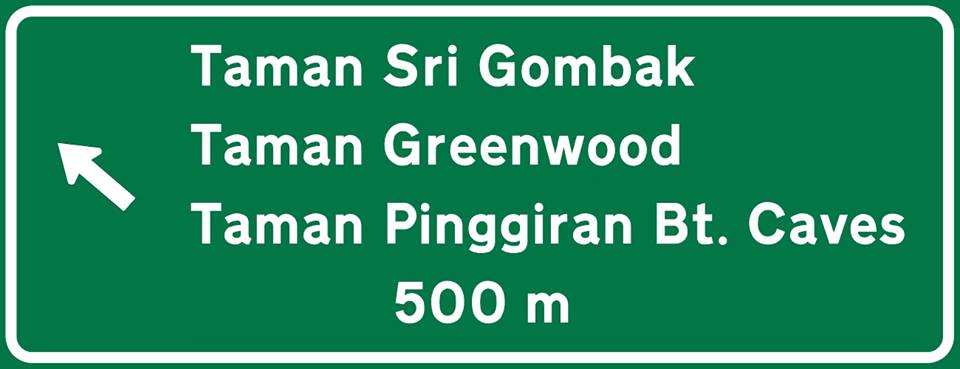
Townships direction sign

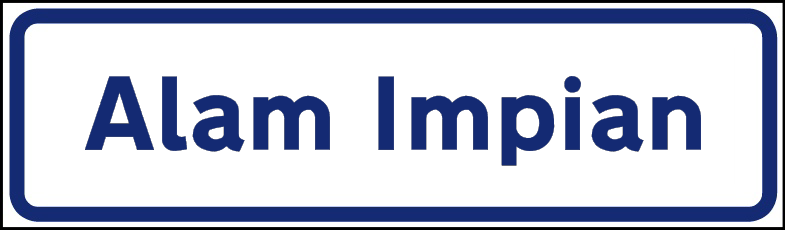
Housing estate/neighbourhood sign

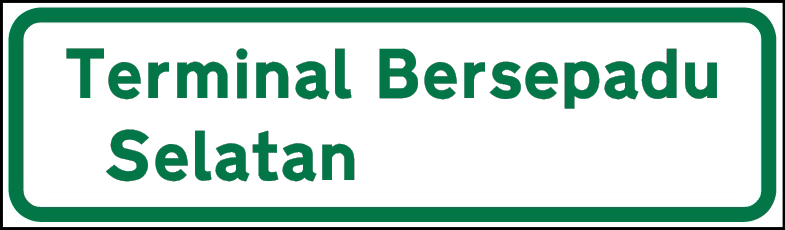
Public transportation name signs

=== Tourist destination signs ===
Malaysian tourist destination signs are in maroon with white and black icons.

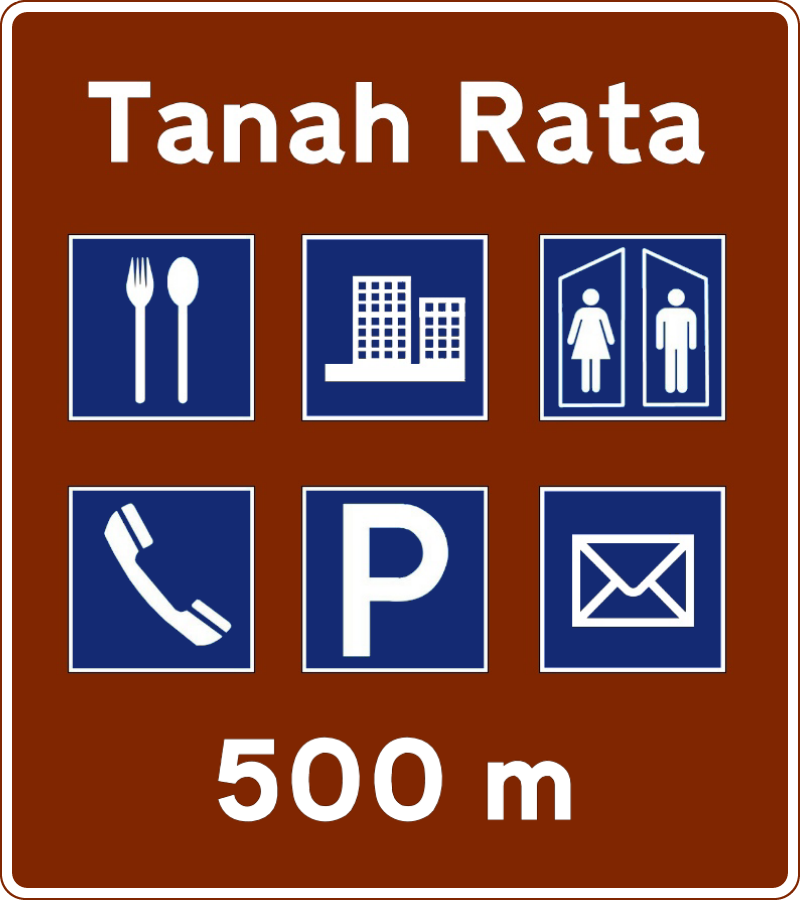
Tourist spot area by 500 m

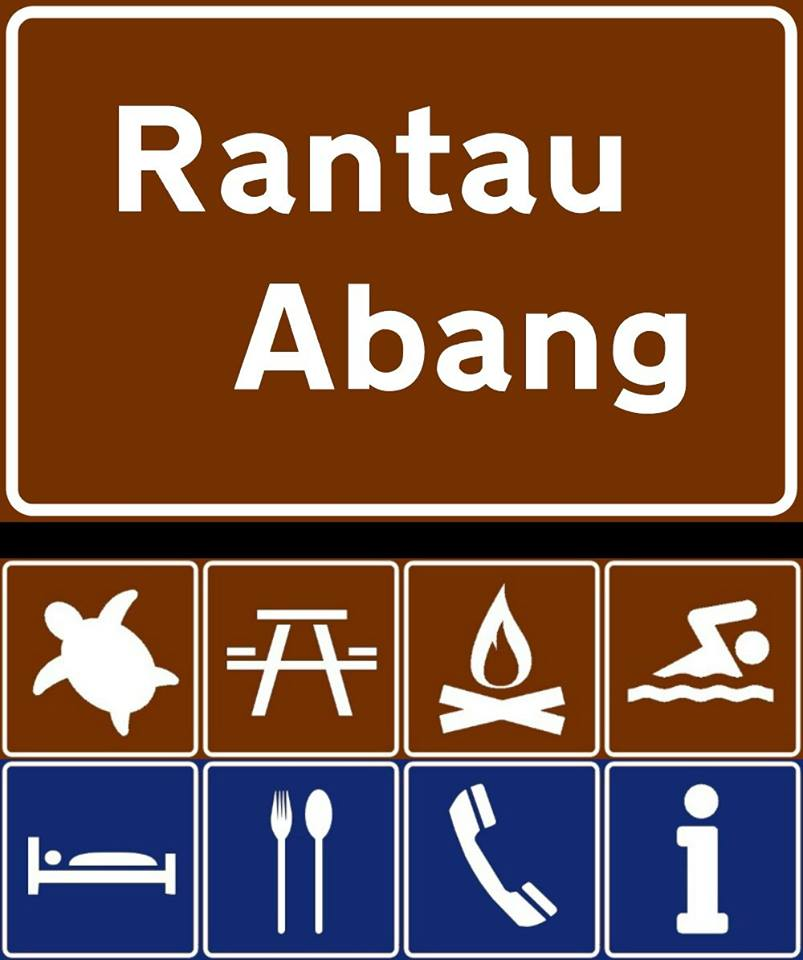
Tourist spot area

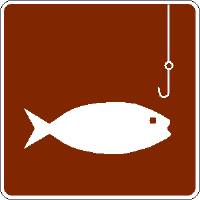
Fishing area

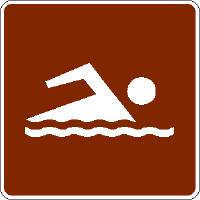
Swimming pool

Recreation area

Camping area

Waterfall area

=== Weighing bridge signs ===
There is also a signs for weighing bridge.

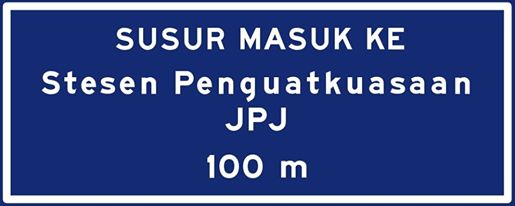
Entry to Weighing bridge

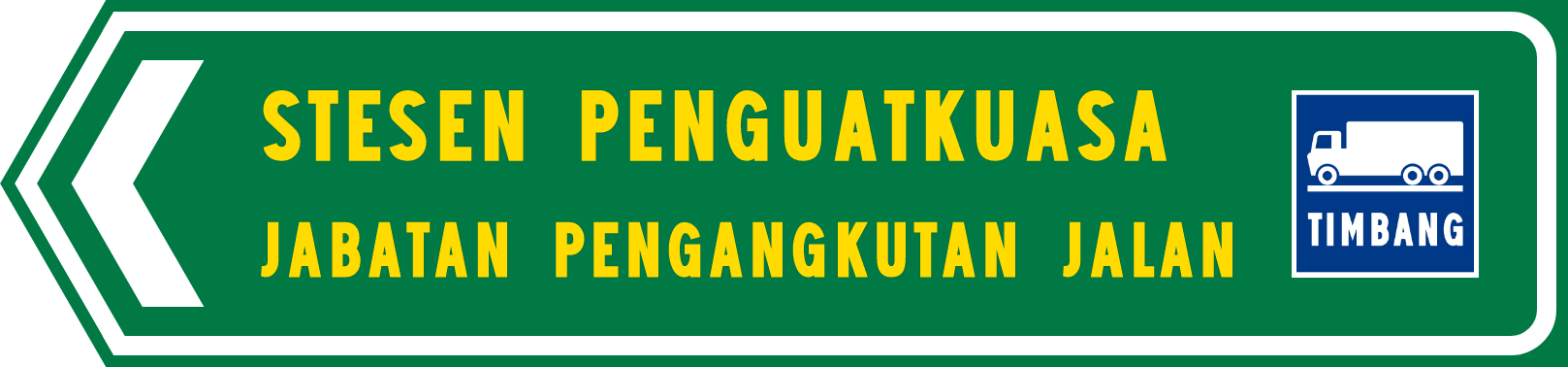
Malaysian Road Transport Department (JPJ) Enforcement Station entry sign

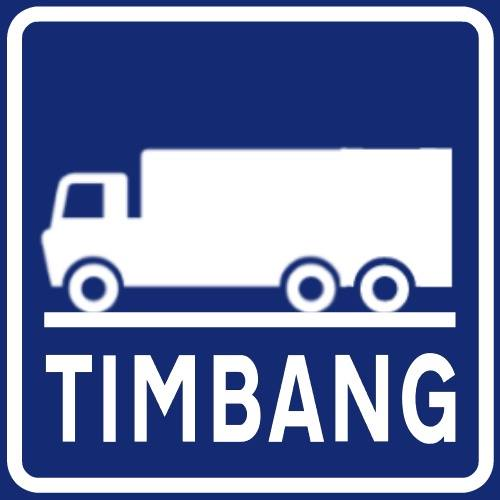
Weighing bridge symbol

=== Road name signs ===
Road name sign in Malaysia have many different colours, shapes and styles according the local authority to design with them.

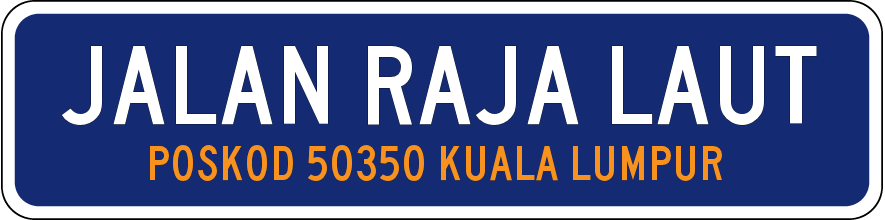
An old Kuala Lumpur road name sign with a Blue background, white letters for road names and orange letters for postcodes.

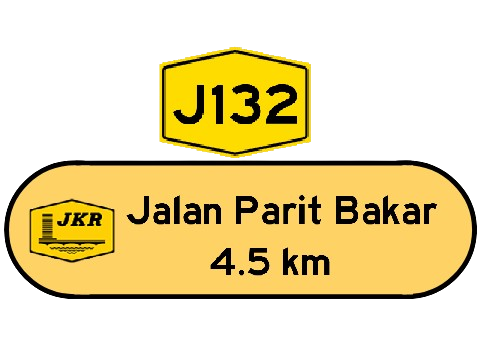
A state route with a Yellow background, black letters for road names and also black letters for kilometers.

A rural road with a Blue background and white letters for road names and weight limit.

A KLIA sign with a Blue background, white letters for road names and red letters for postcodes.

A new Ipoh road name sign with a White background, green letters for road names and red letters for postcodes.

A new Cameron Highlands road name sign with a Black background and white letters for road names and postcodes.

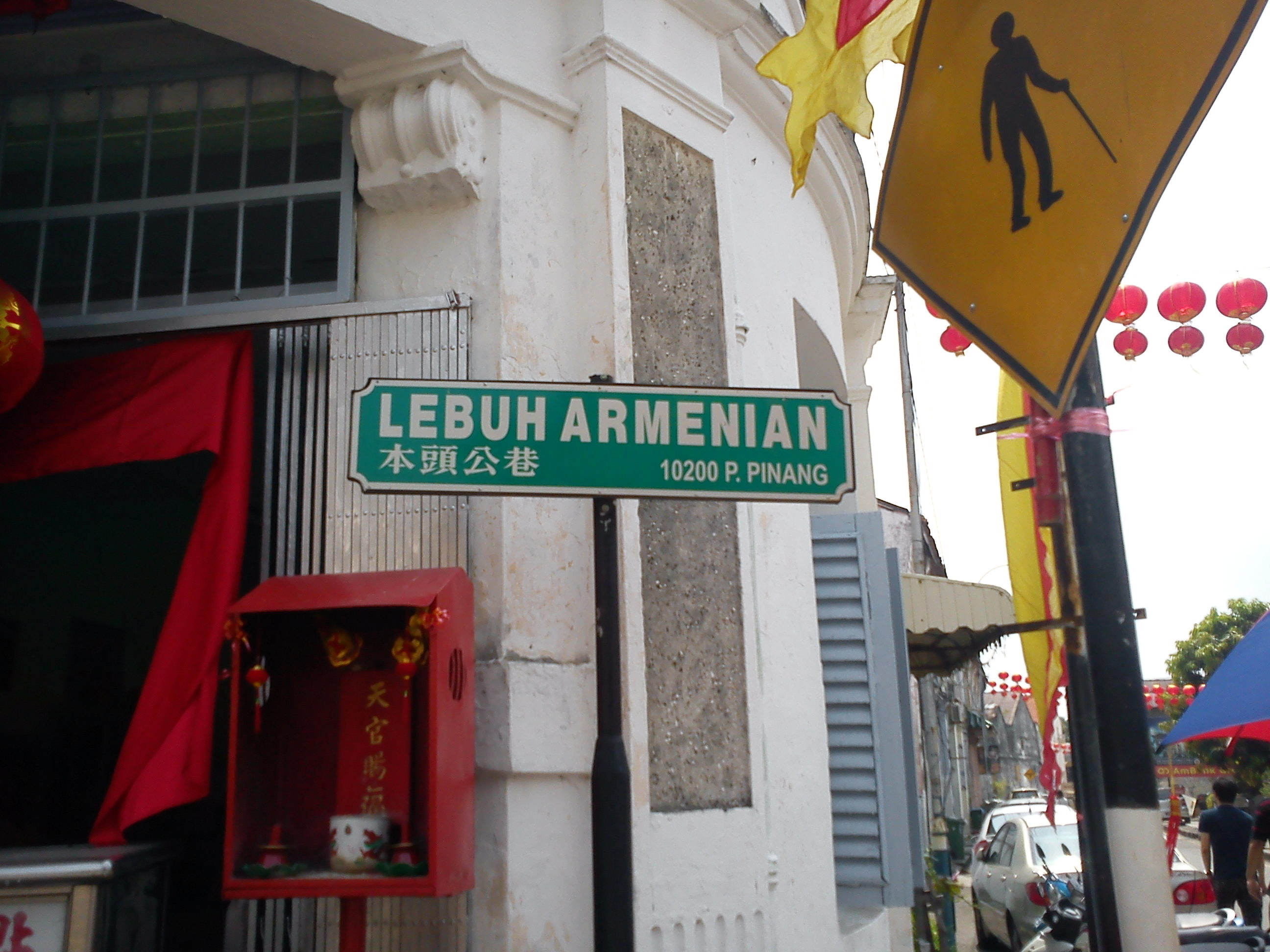
A bilingual (Malay/Chinese) road sign in George Town, Penang which is under the authority of the Penang Island City Council (MBPP).

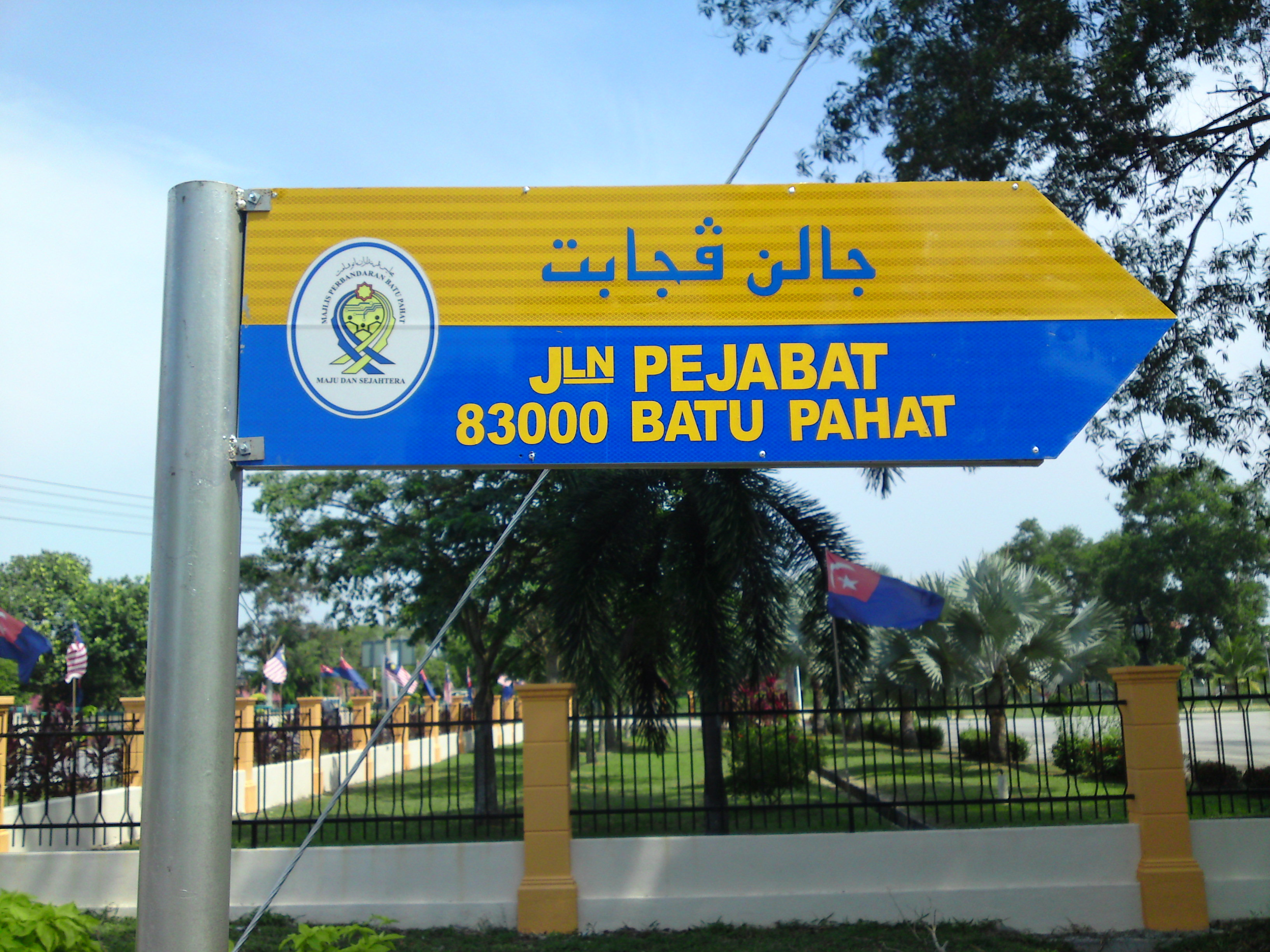
Road name sign in Batu Pahat, Johor with dual-script (Malay-Jawi), under authority by MPBP

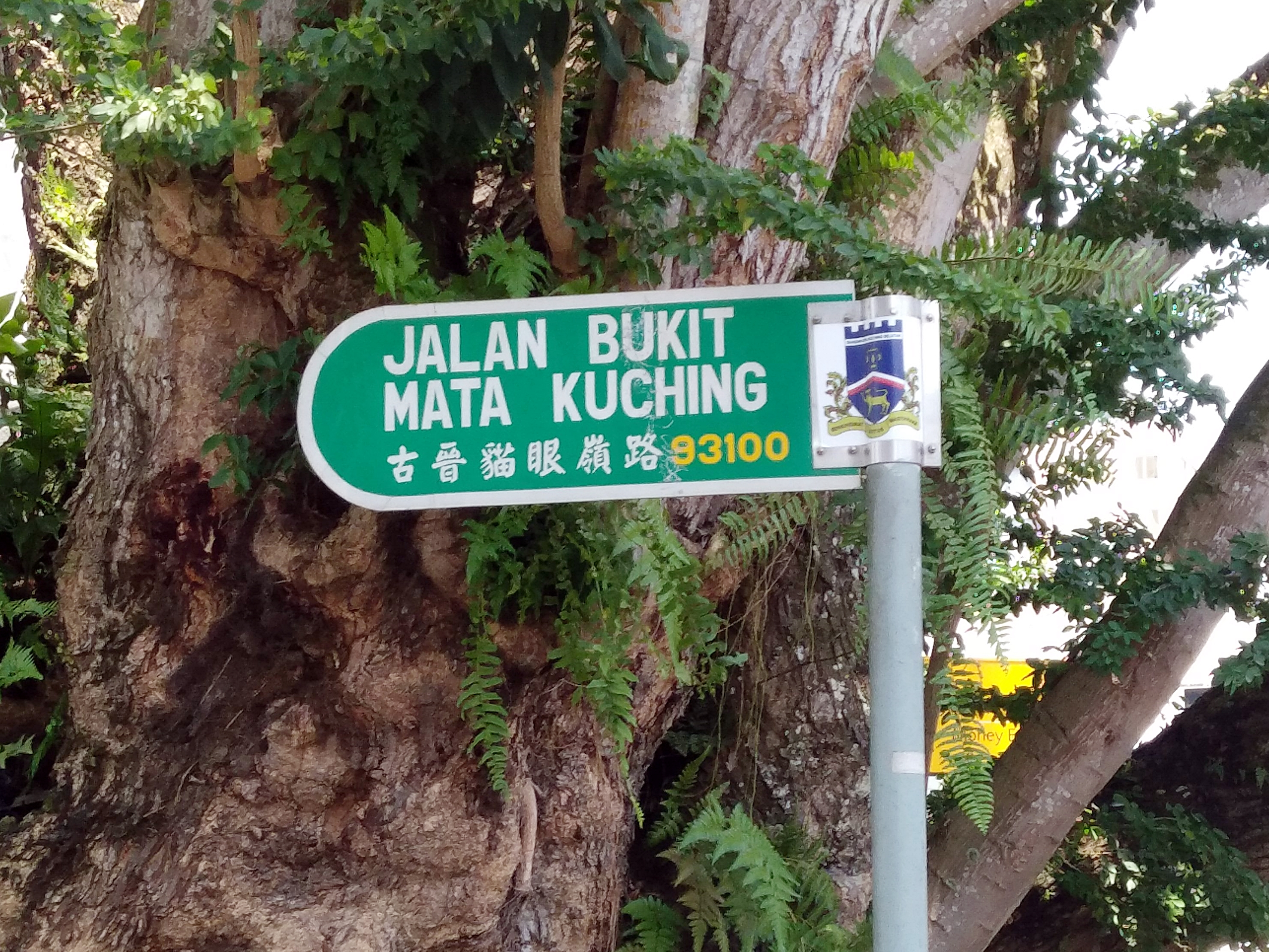
A dual language (Malay/Chinese) road sign in Kuching, Sarawak under the authority of the Kuching South City Council (MBKS).

== Road markings ==
Road markings in Malaysia primarily use thermoplastic and are white. Yellow markings are usually for road shoulders, construction or temporary markings and parking.

=== Centre lines ===
Centre lines divide the road into either direction.

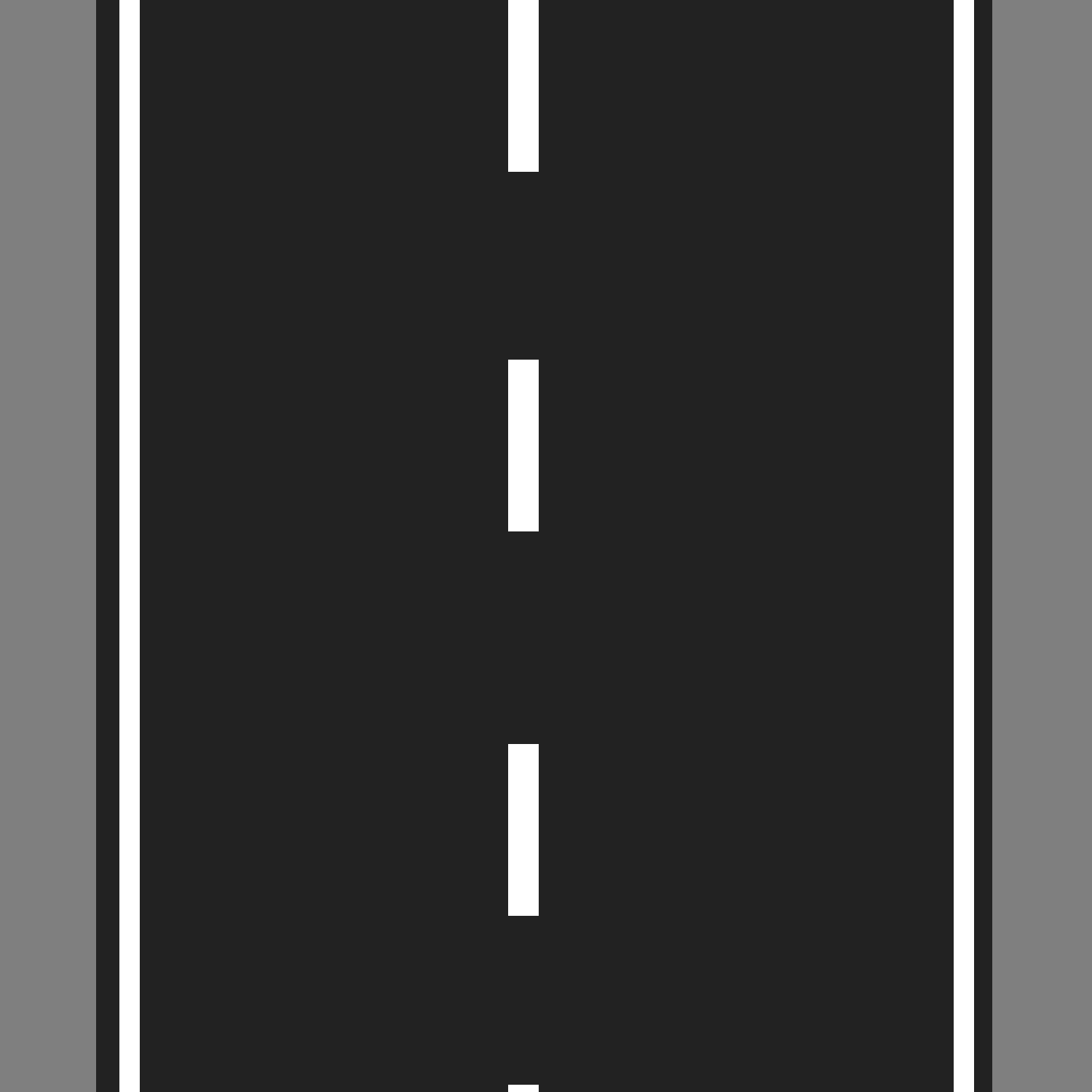
Standard road centre line on urban and residential roads.

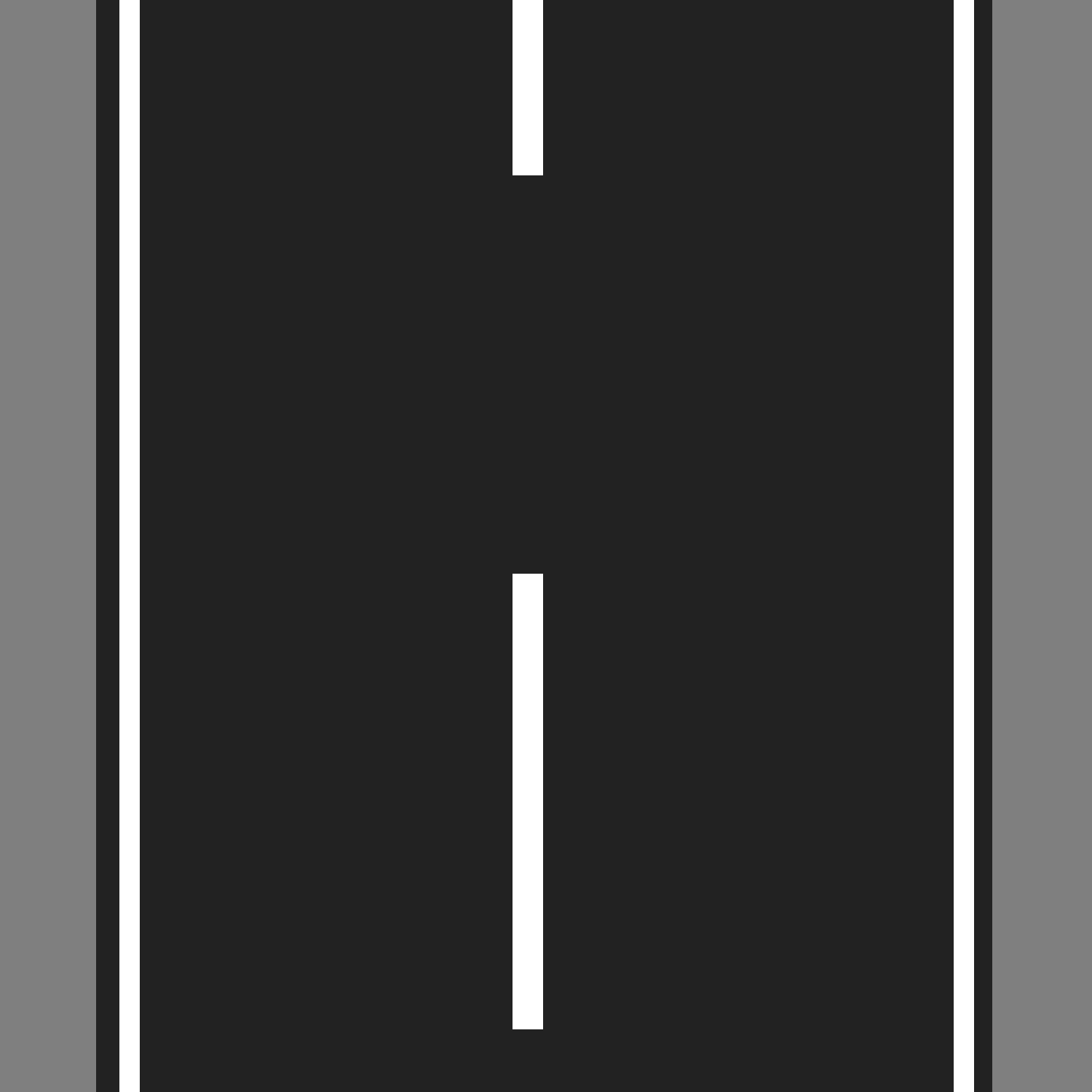
Standard road centre line on federal roads.

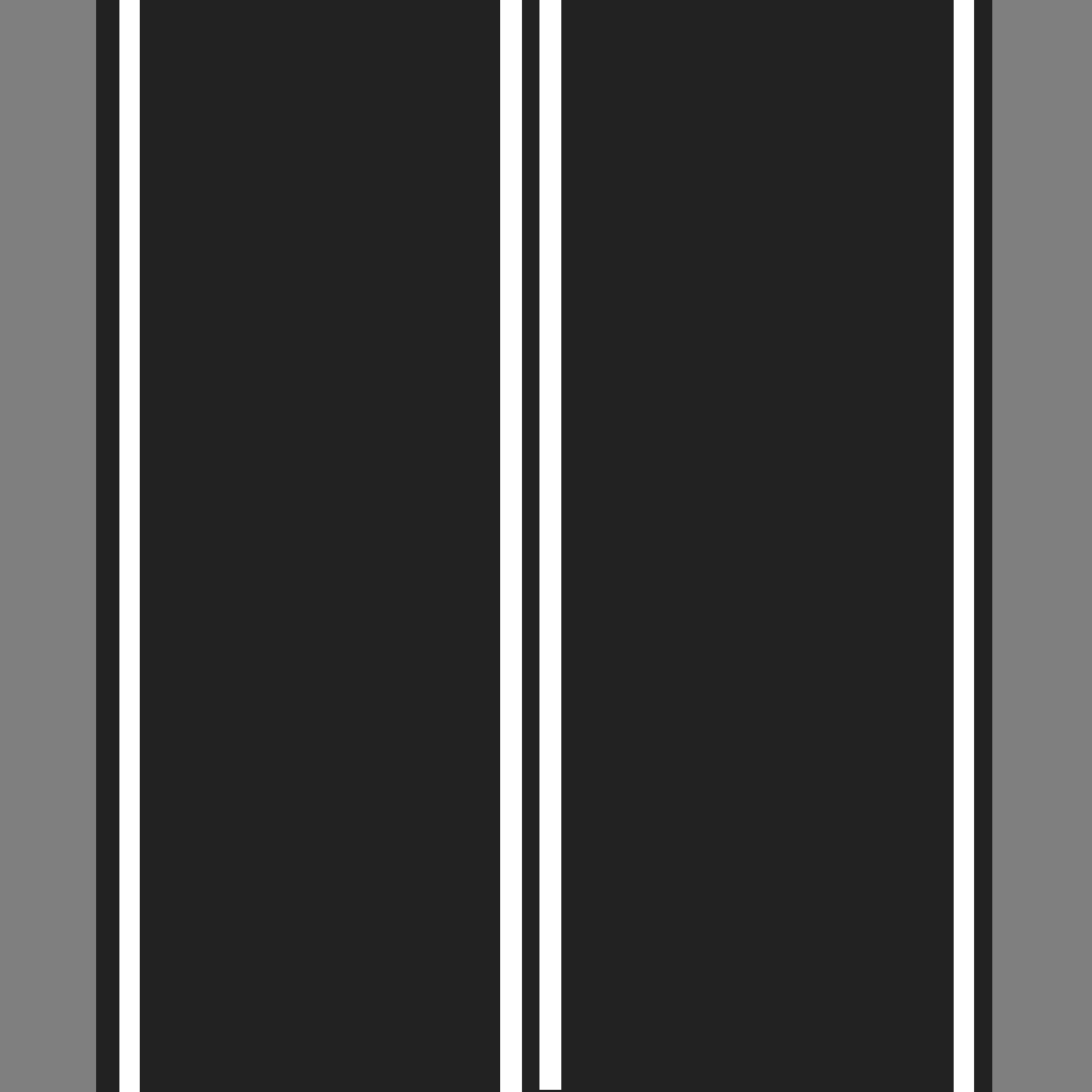
Strictly no overtaking center line.

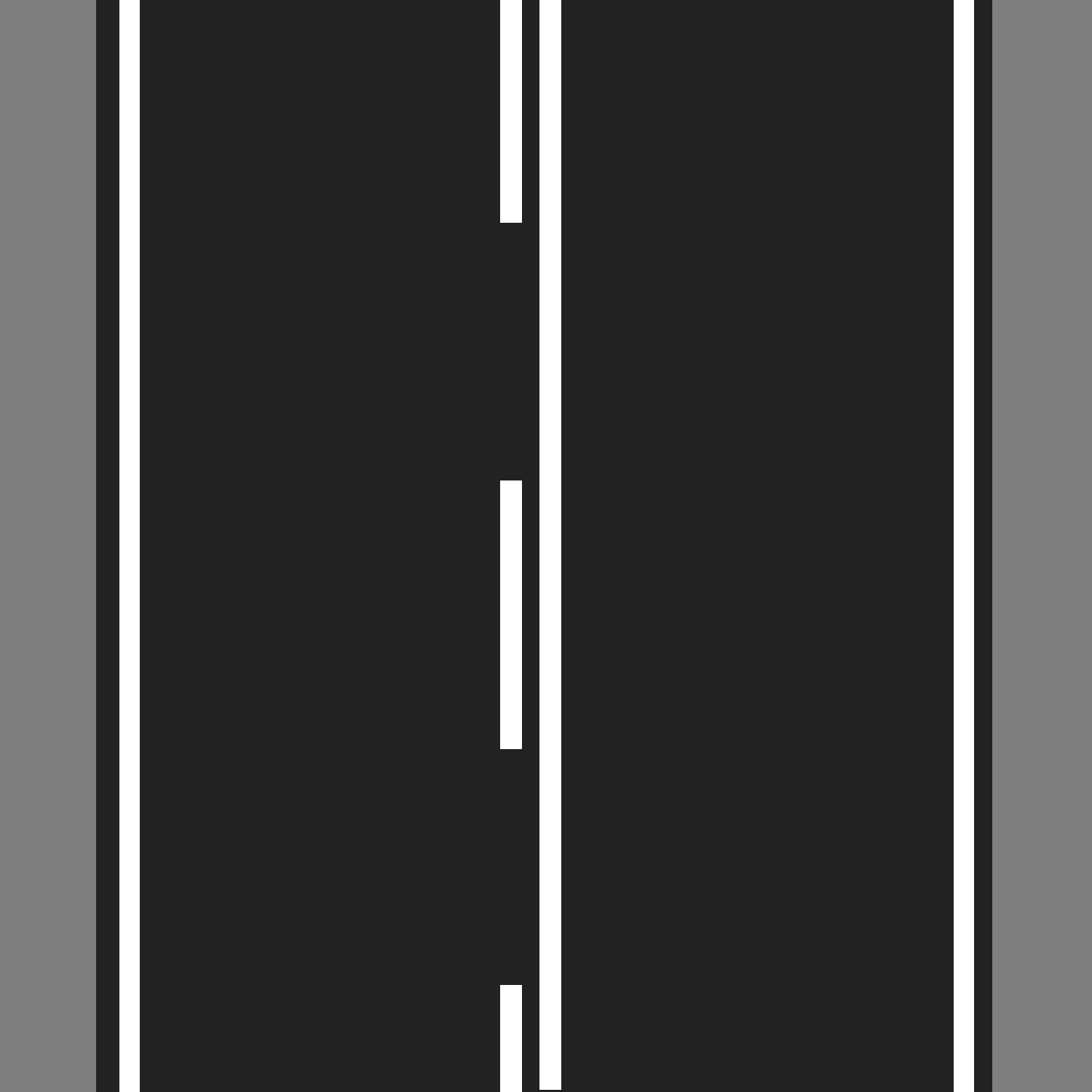
Overtaking is allowed with caution centre line, opposite direction cannot overtake.

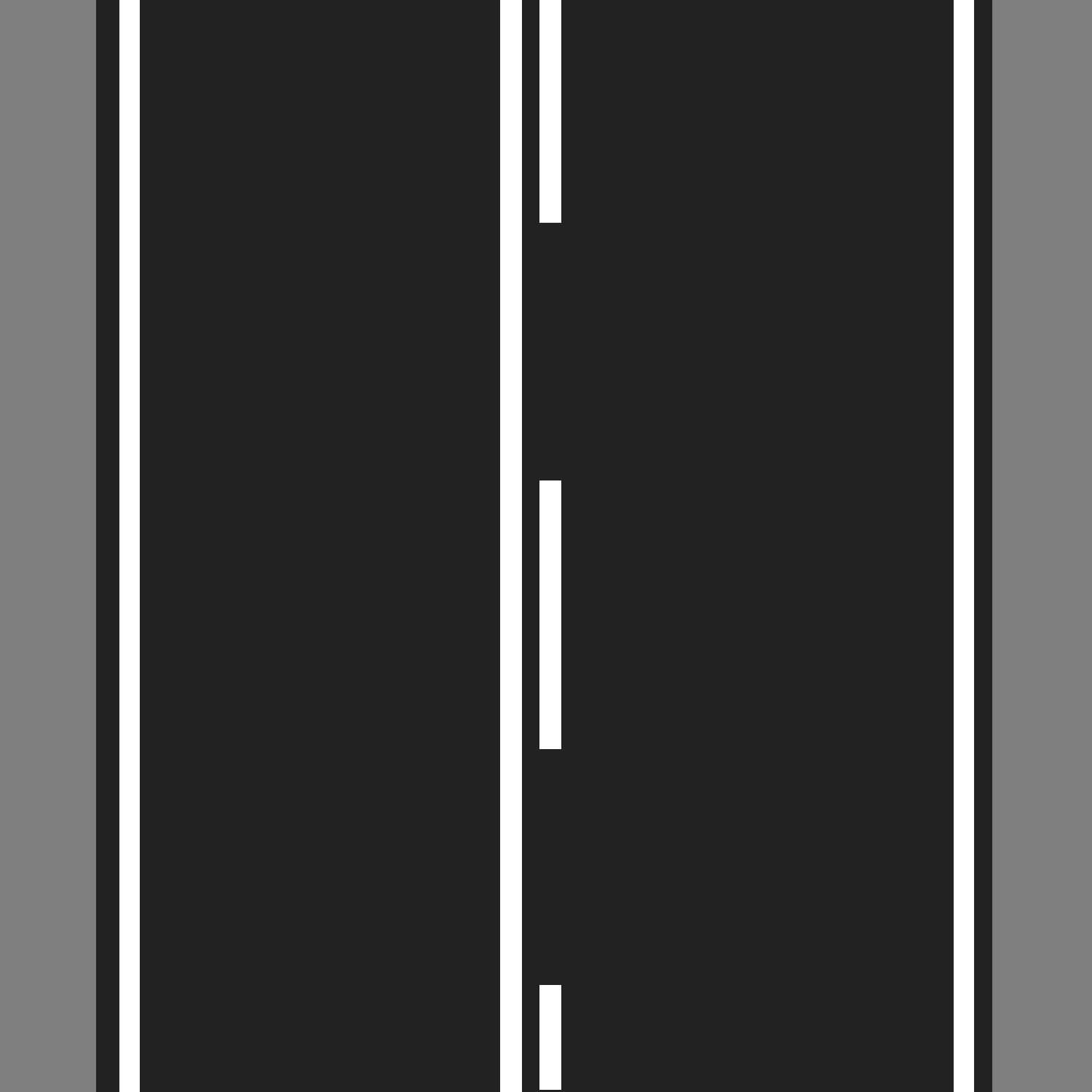
Overtaking not allowed, only opposite direction can overtake centre line.

=== Edge lines ===
Edge lines are located at the edges of a road, whether there is a median or pavement or not.

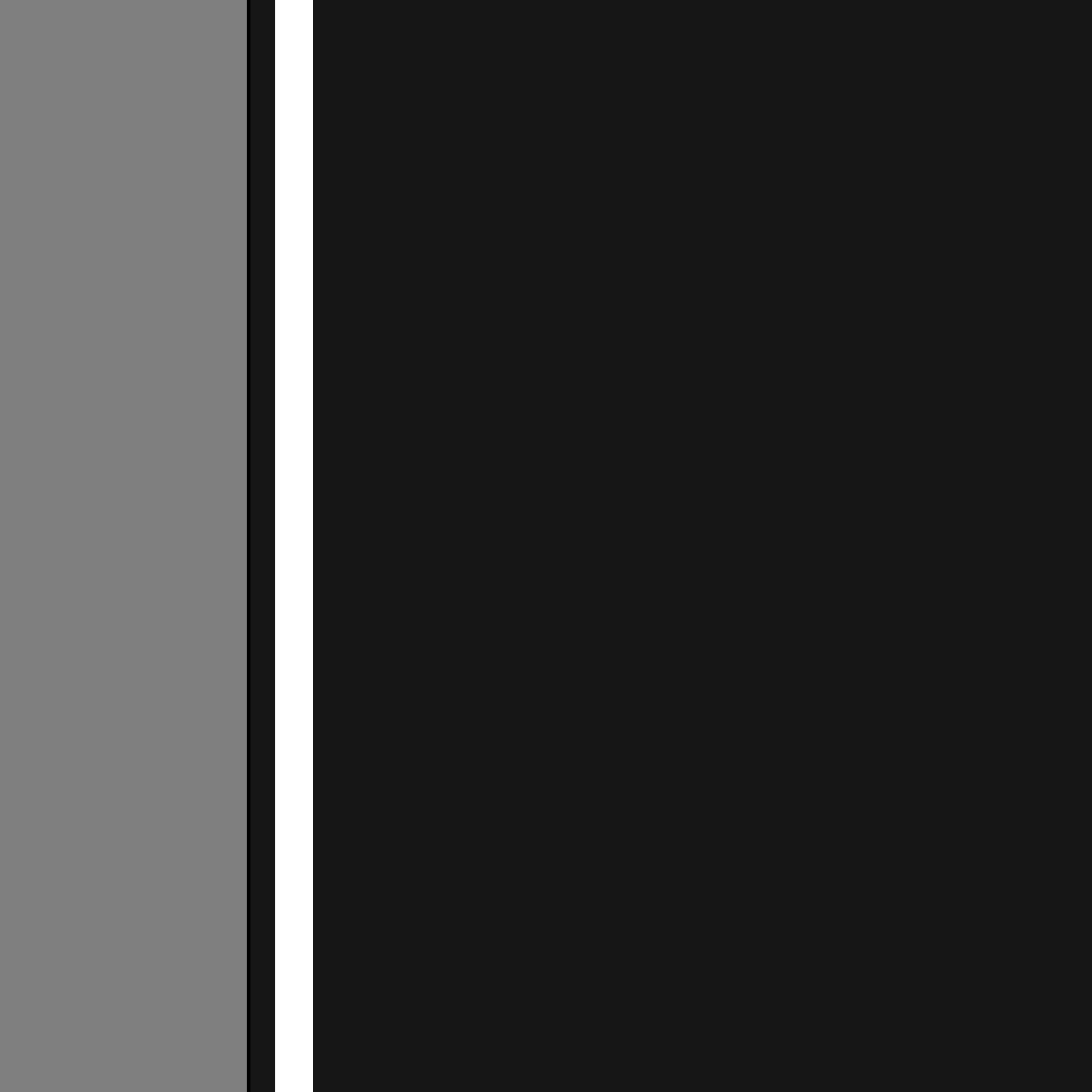
Standard roadside edge line.

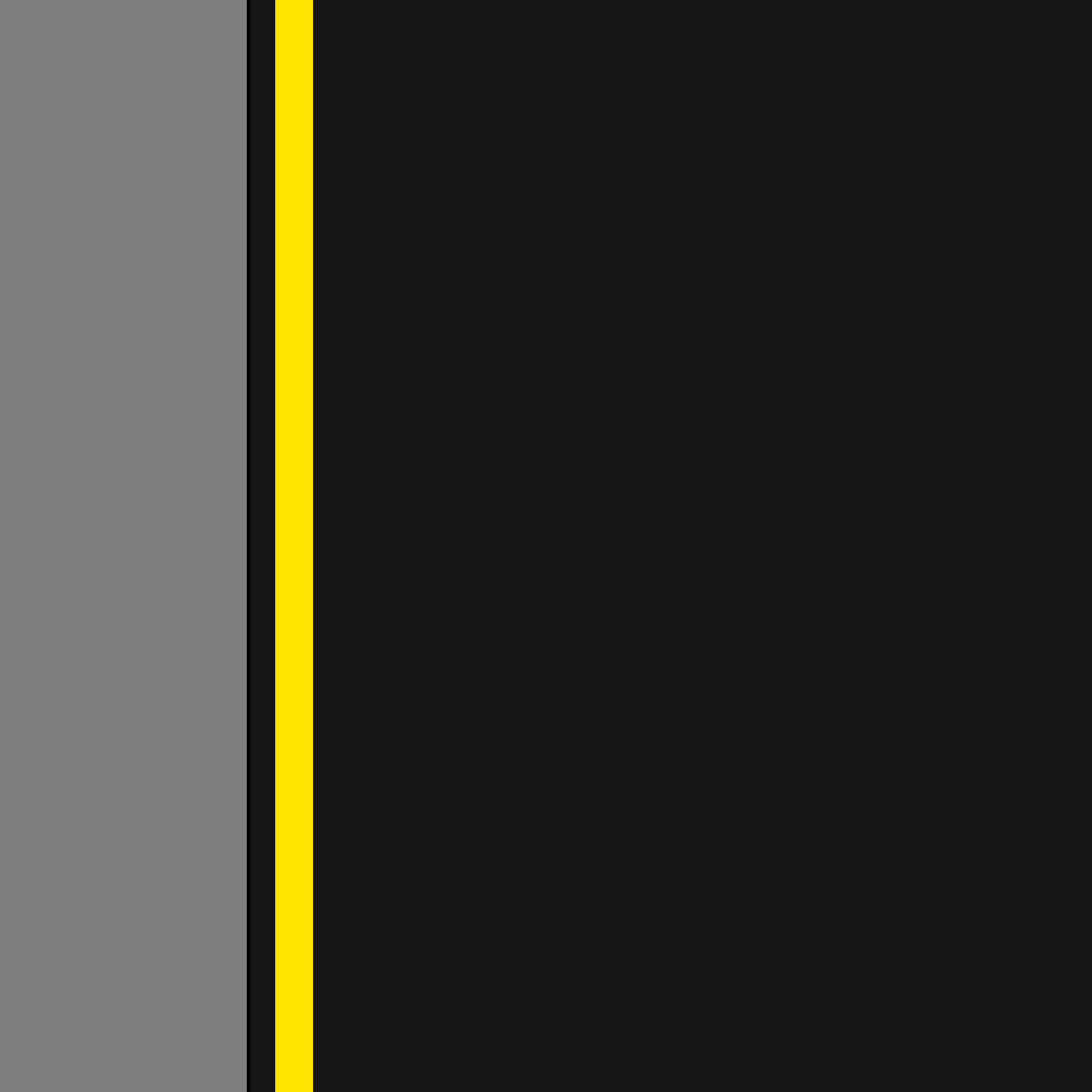
No parking on roadside edge line.

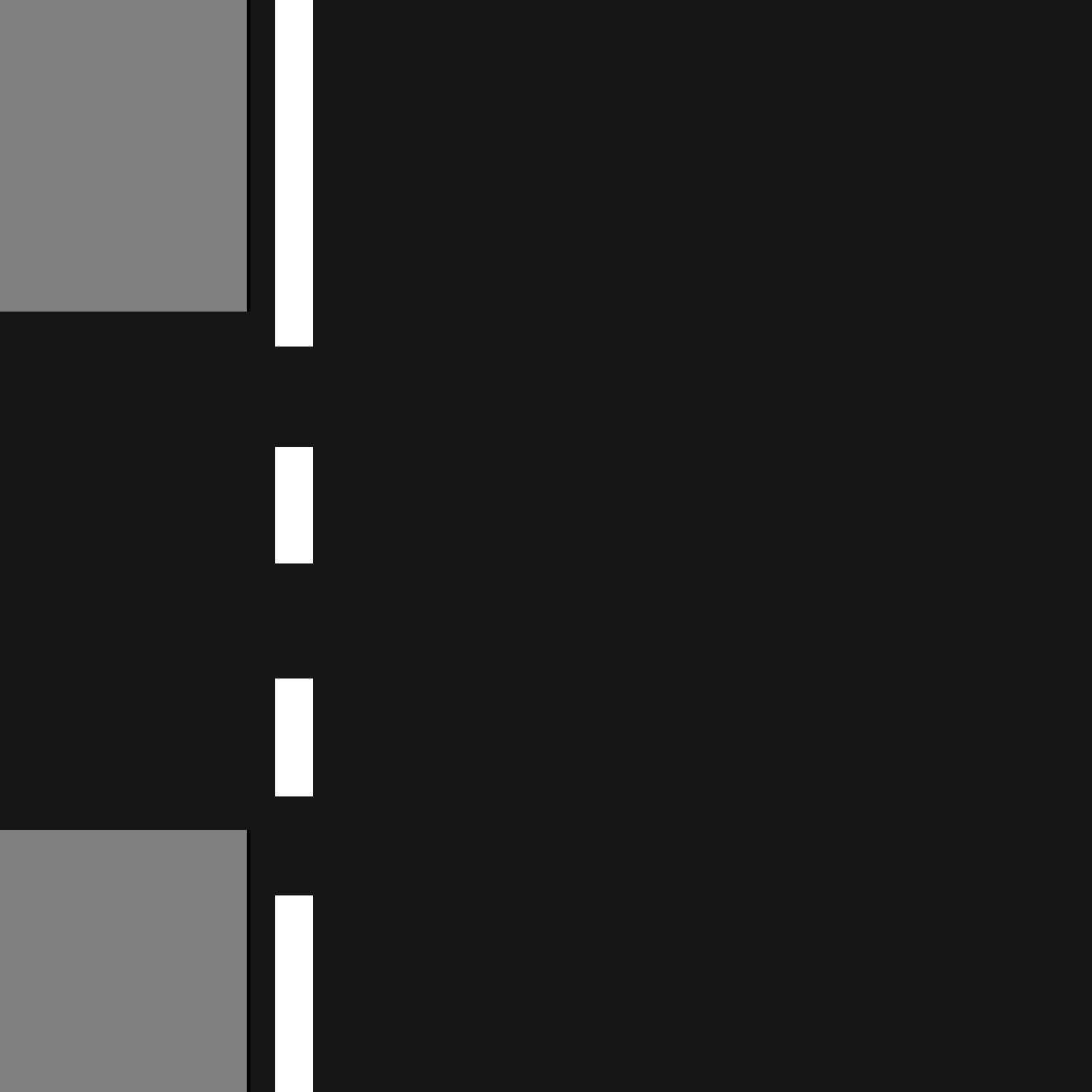
Opening on roadside edge line (building entrances, etc.)

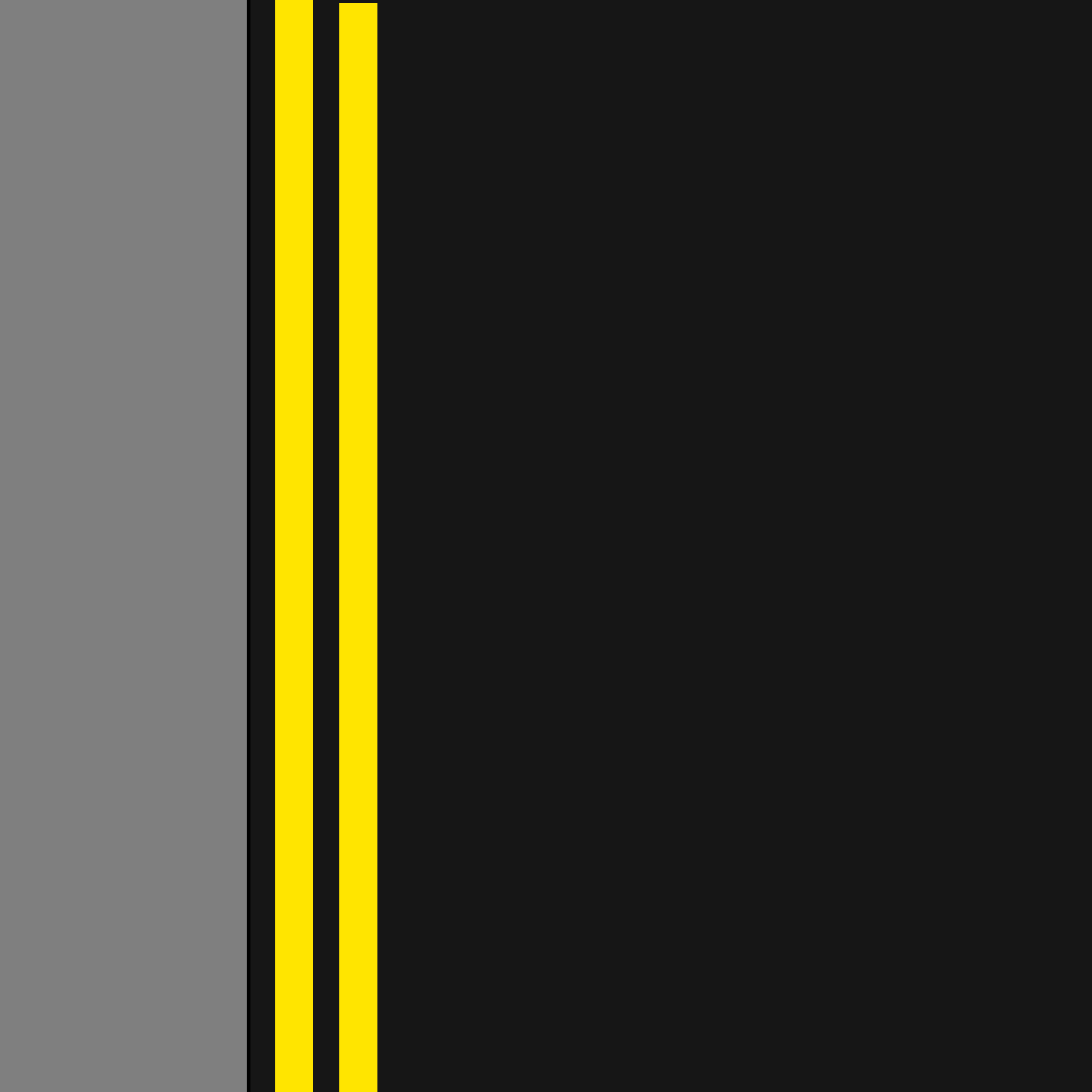
Strictly no parking or stopping on roadside edge line

=== Lane dividers ===
Lane dividers divide road into lanes according to its designated width.

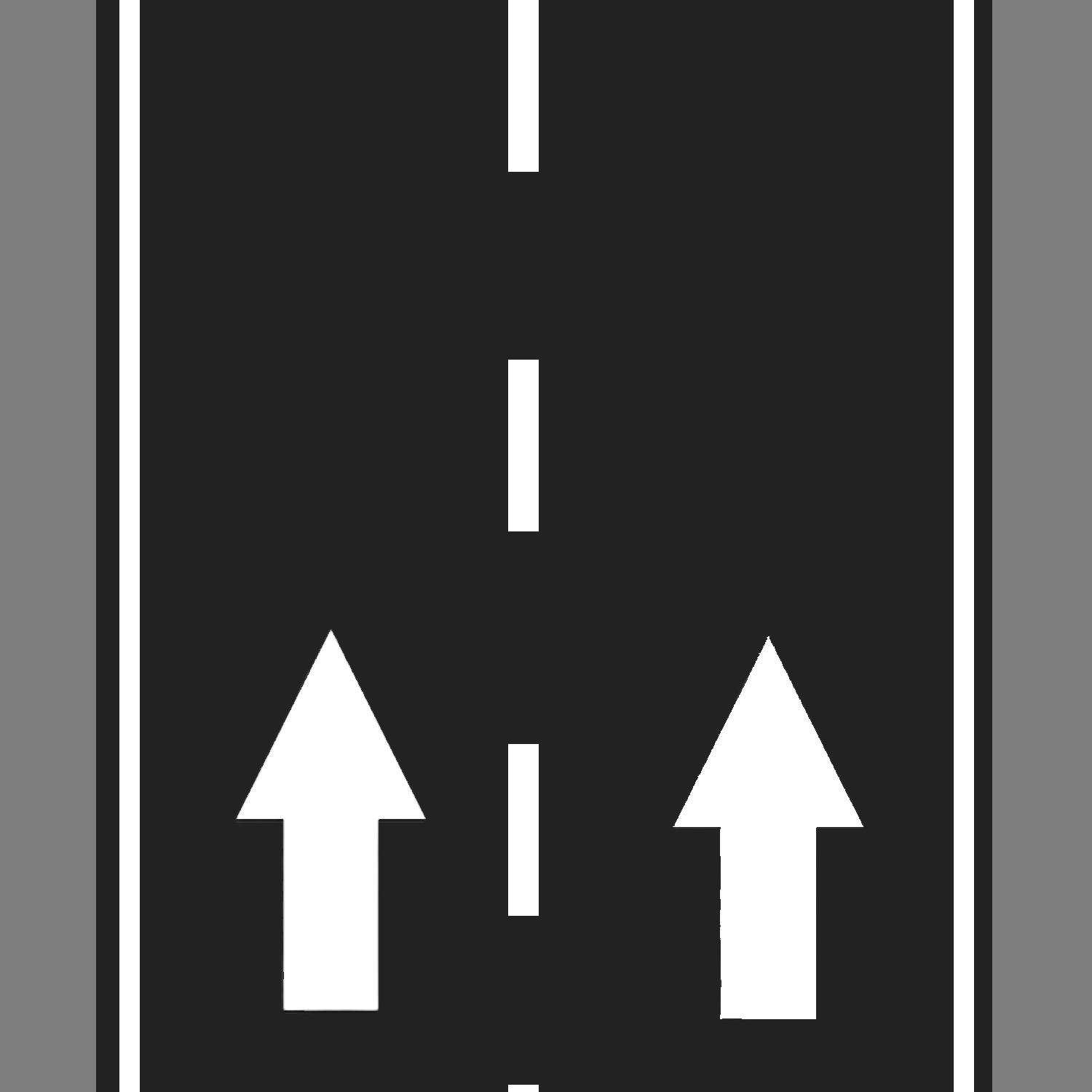
Standard lane divider on highways (JKR R5) and urban/residential roads.

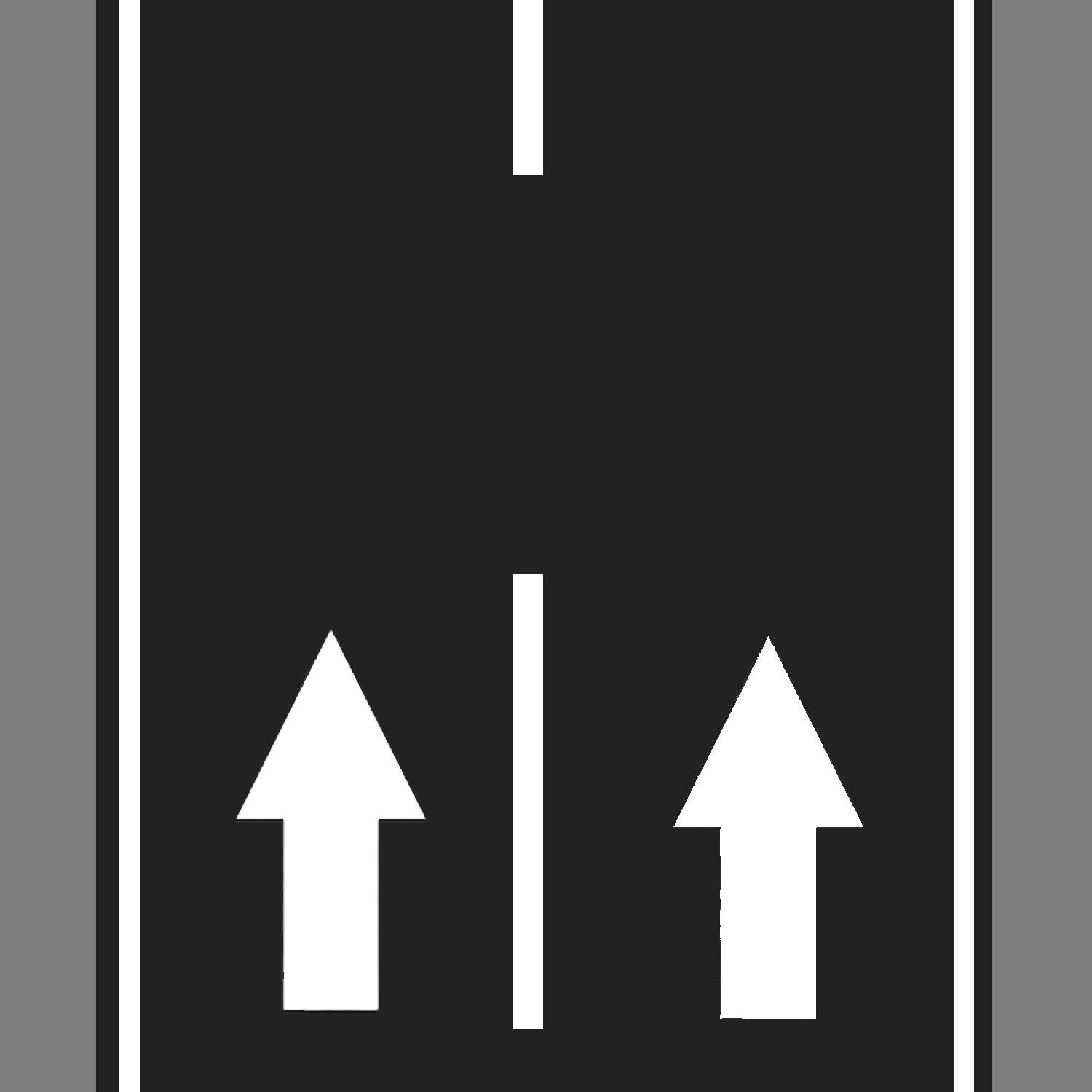
Standard lane divider on highways (JKR R6) and federal roads.

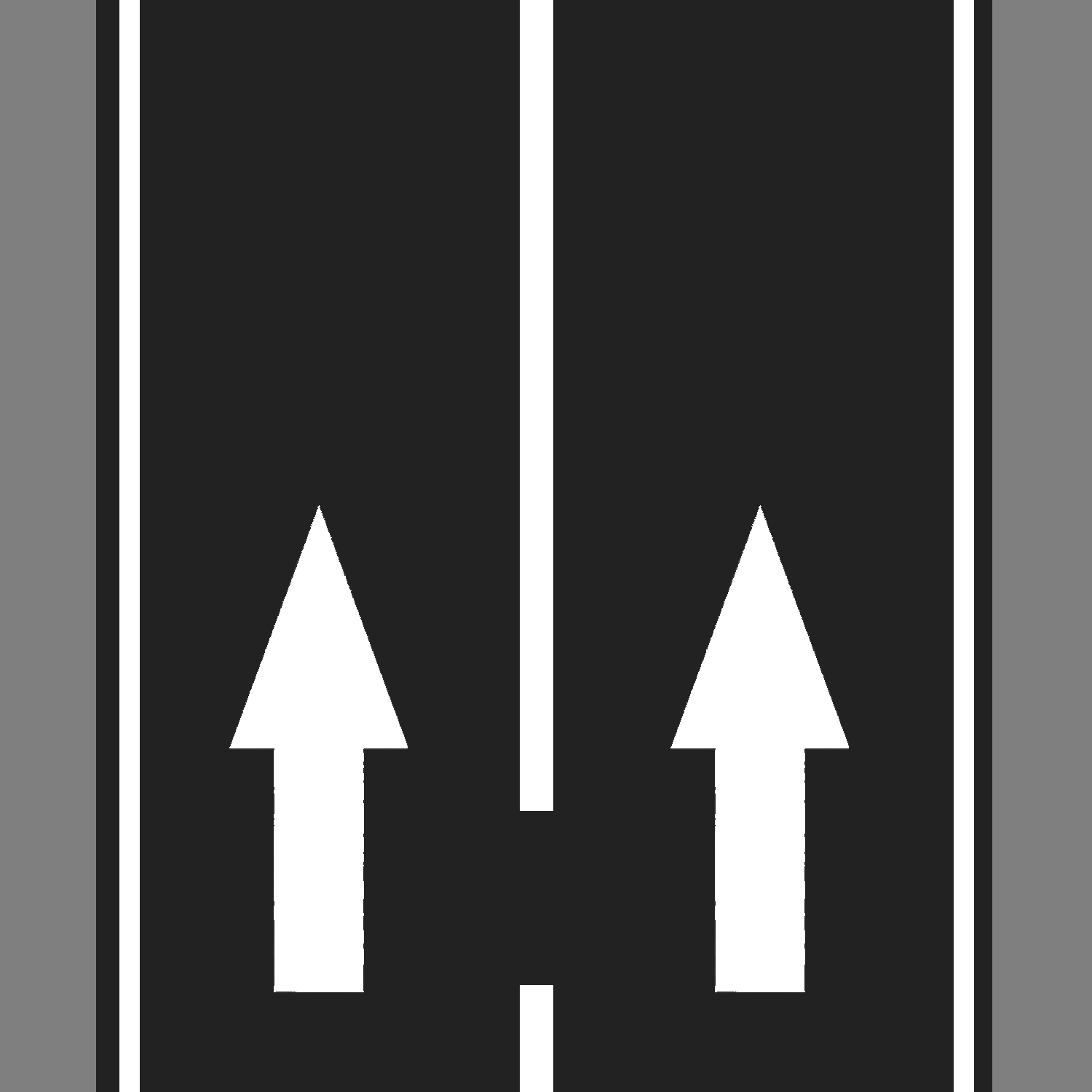
Overtaking and changing lanes not encouraged lane divider.

=== Directional markings ===
Directional marking consists of arrows and lettering on the road.

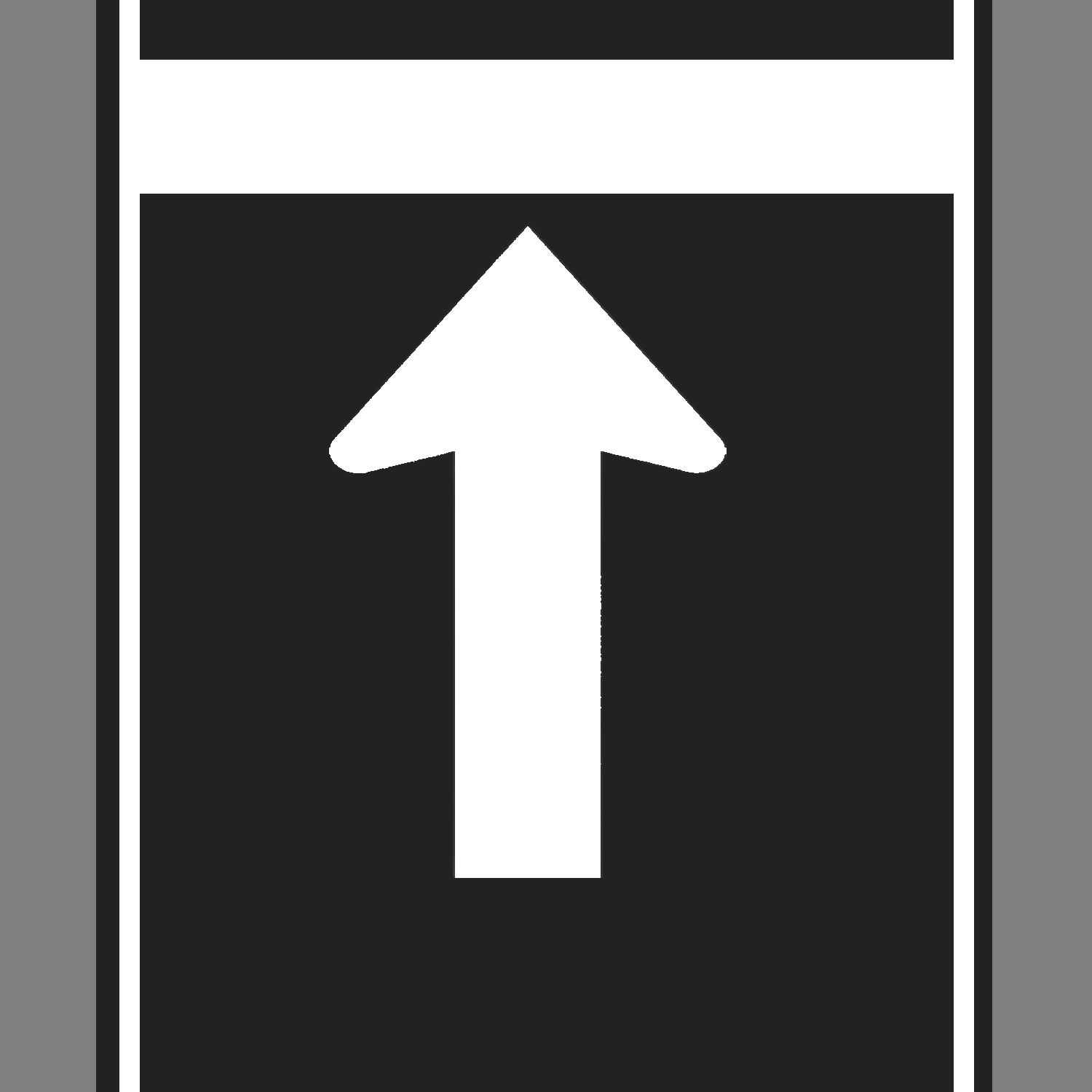
Straight arrow

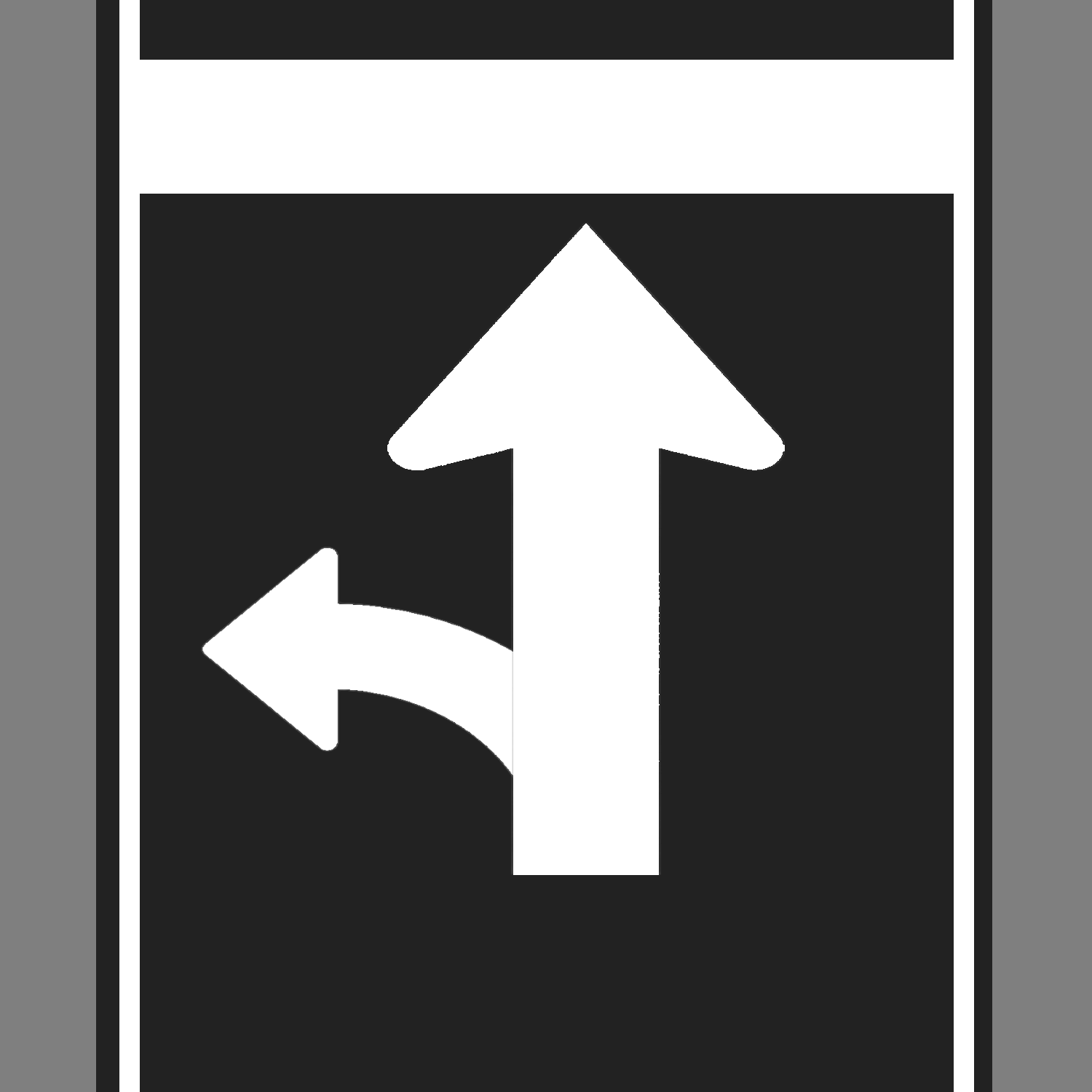
Straight or turn left arrow

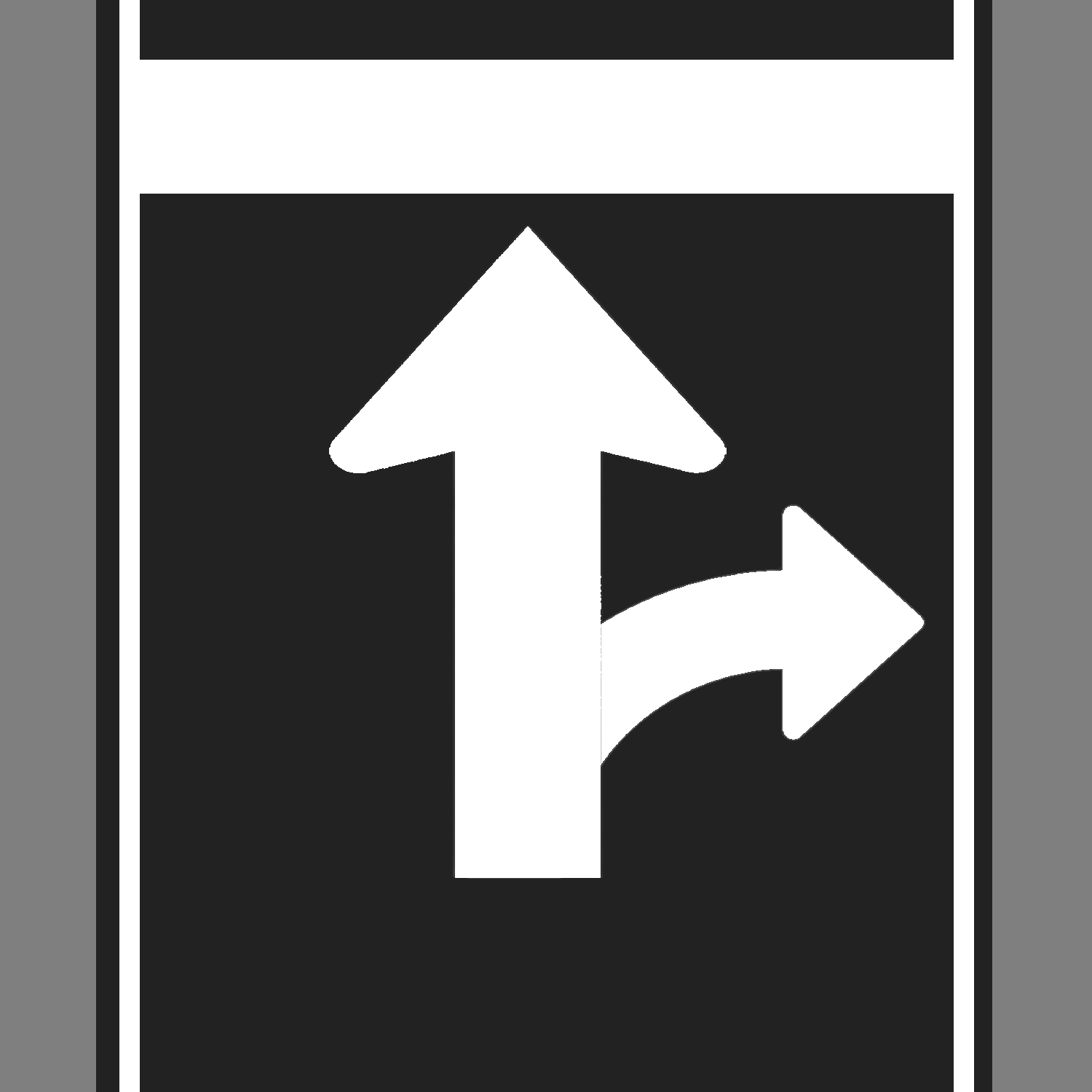
Straight or turn right arrow

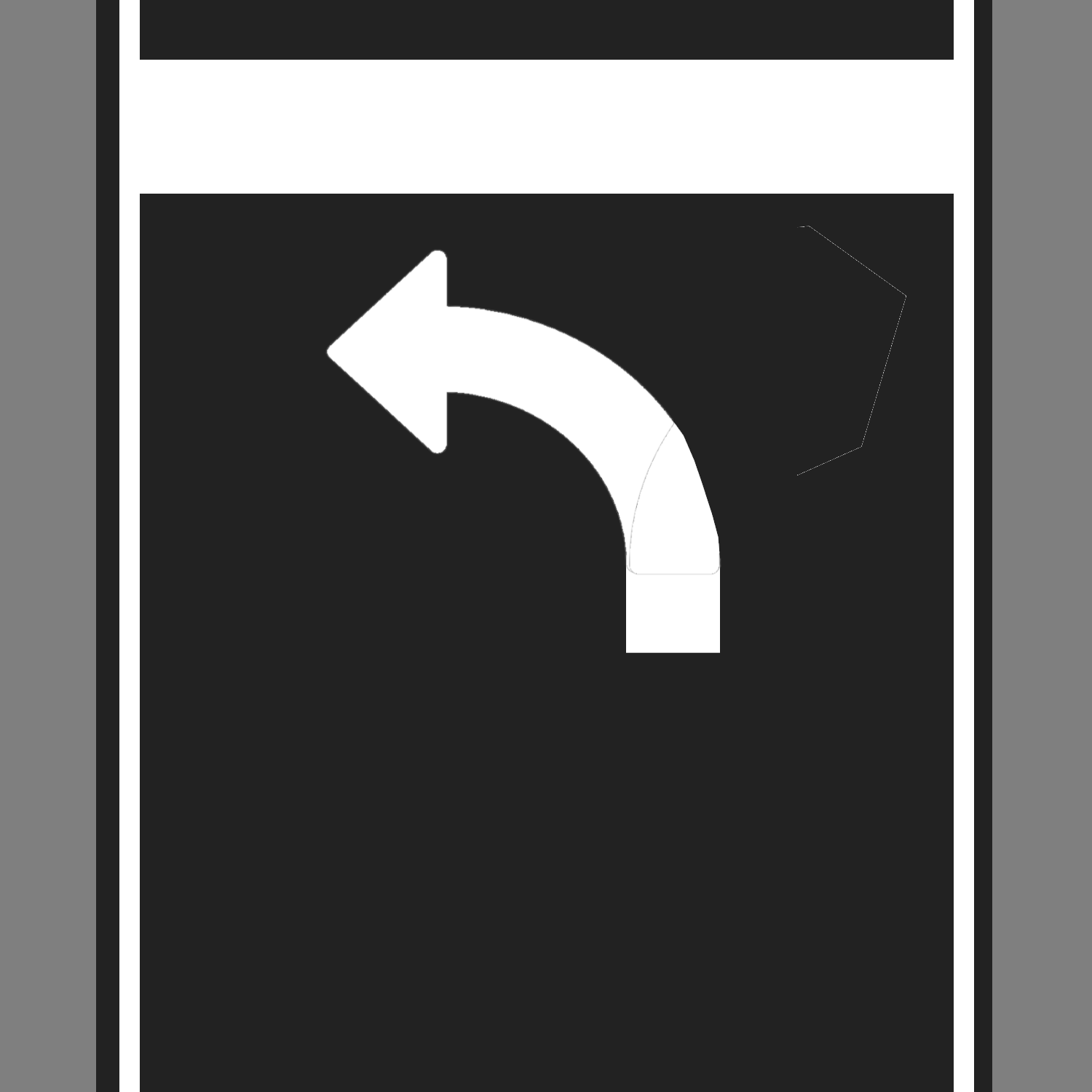
Turn left arrow

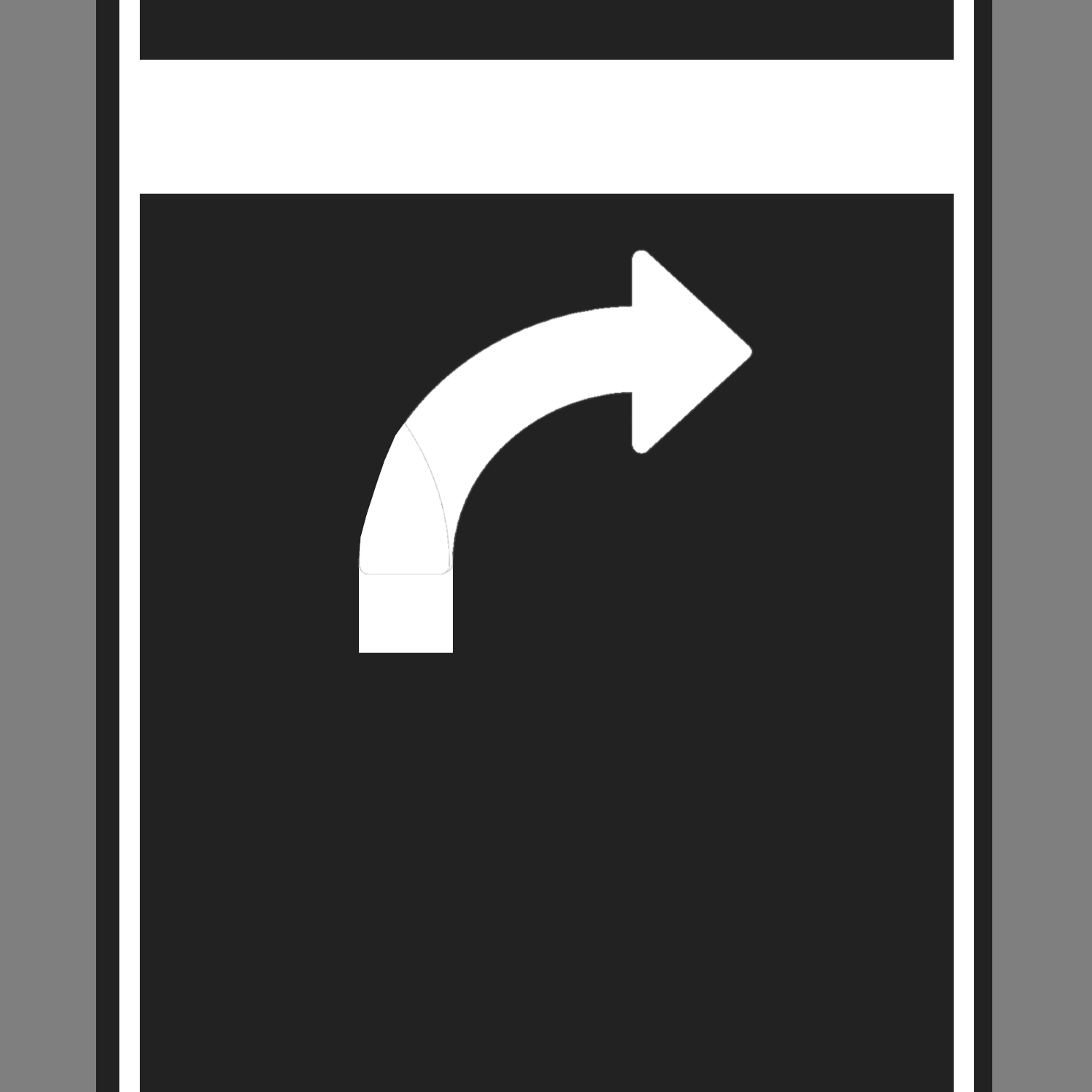
Turn right arrow

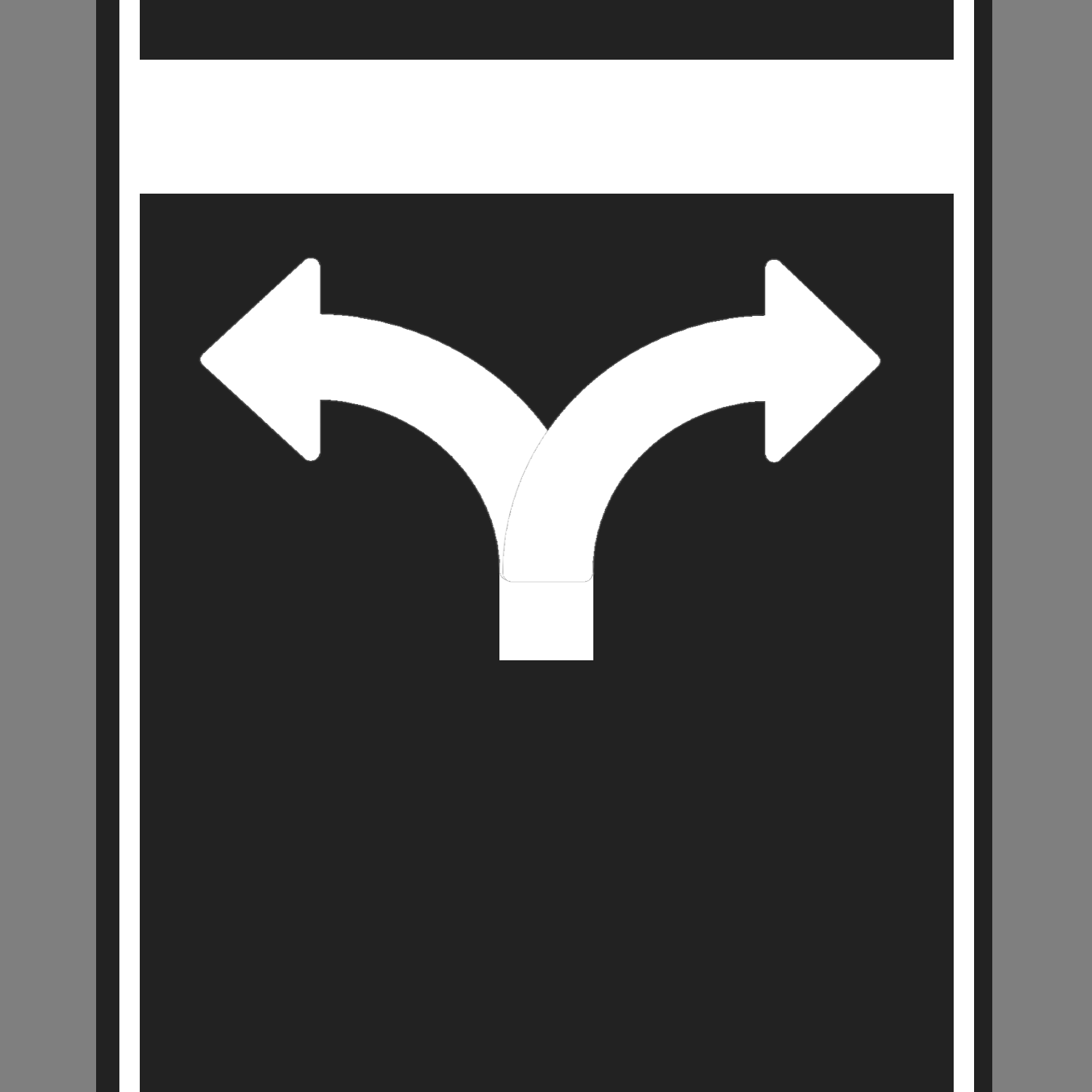
Turn left or right arrow

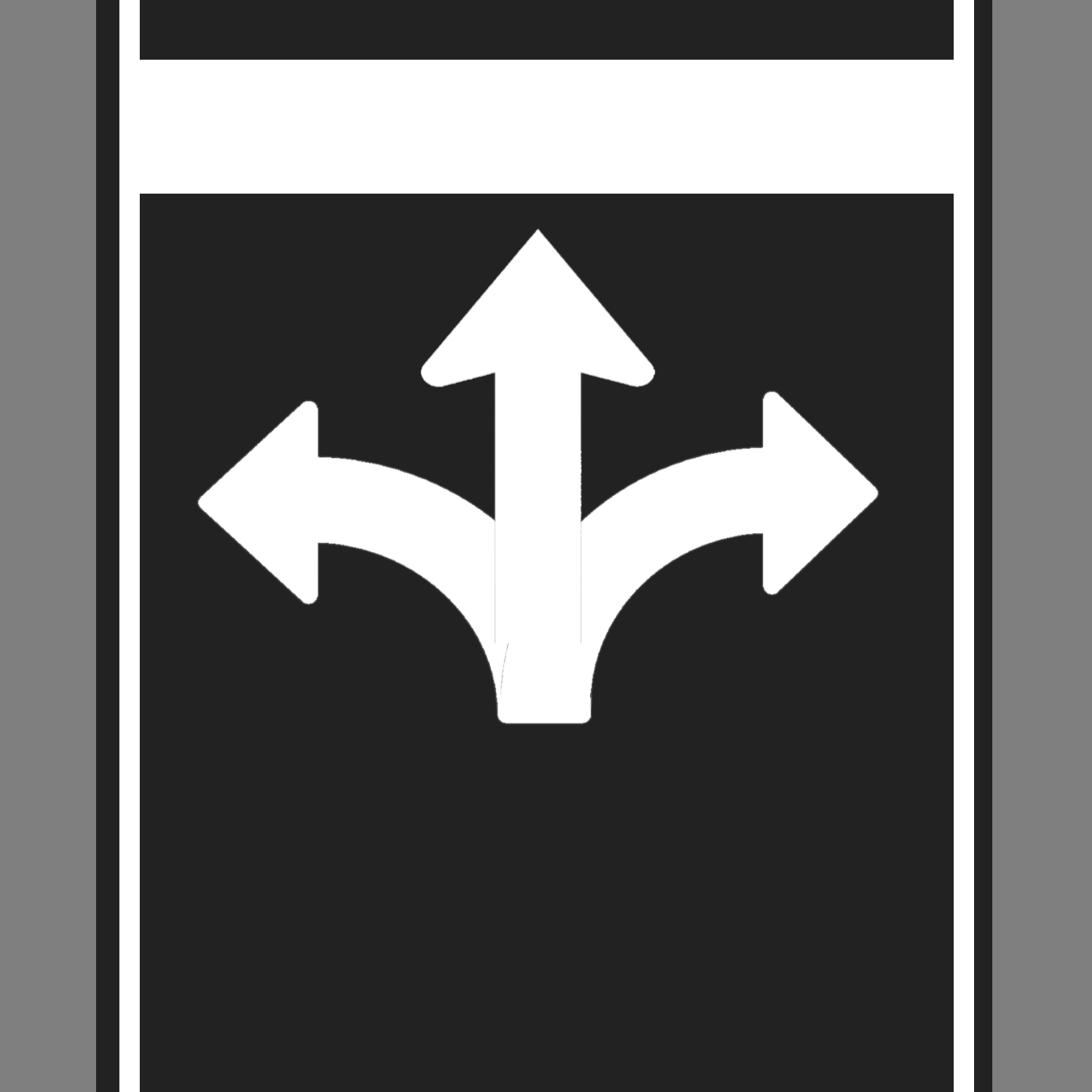
Straight or turn left or right arrow

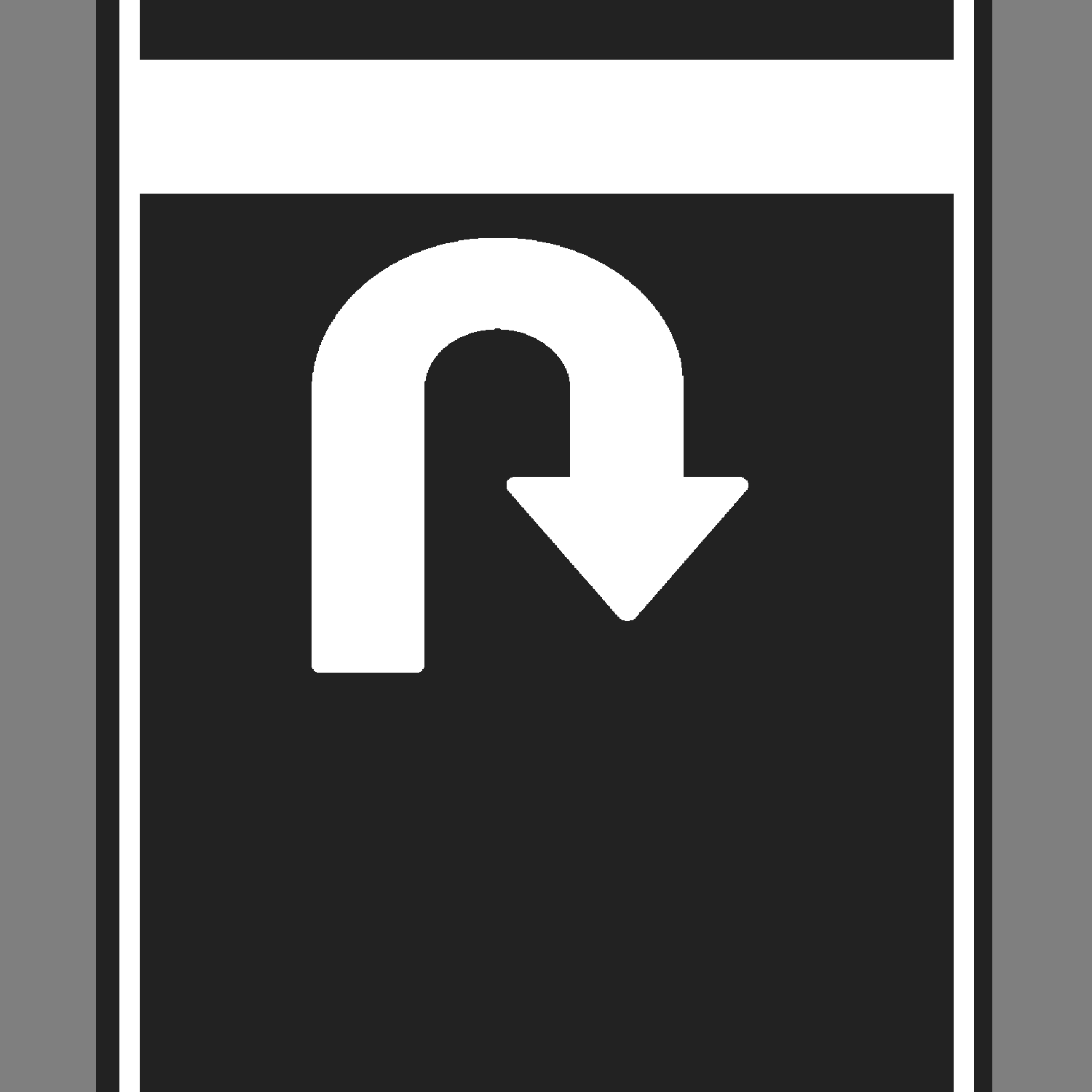
U-Turn arrow

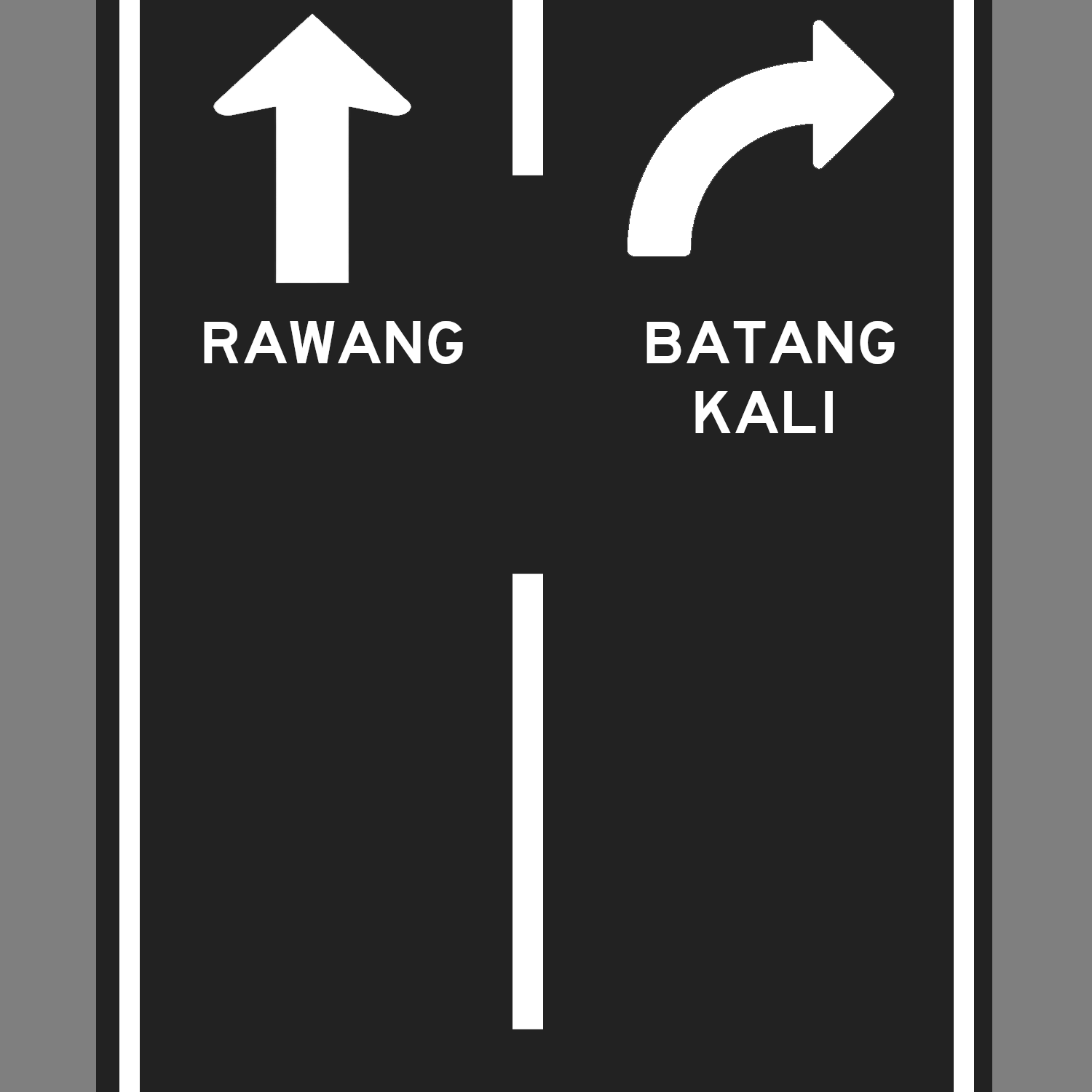
Junction direction lettering with arrow (Option 1)

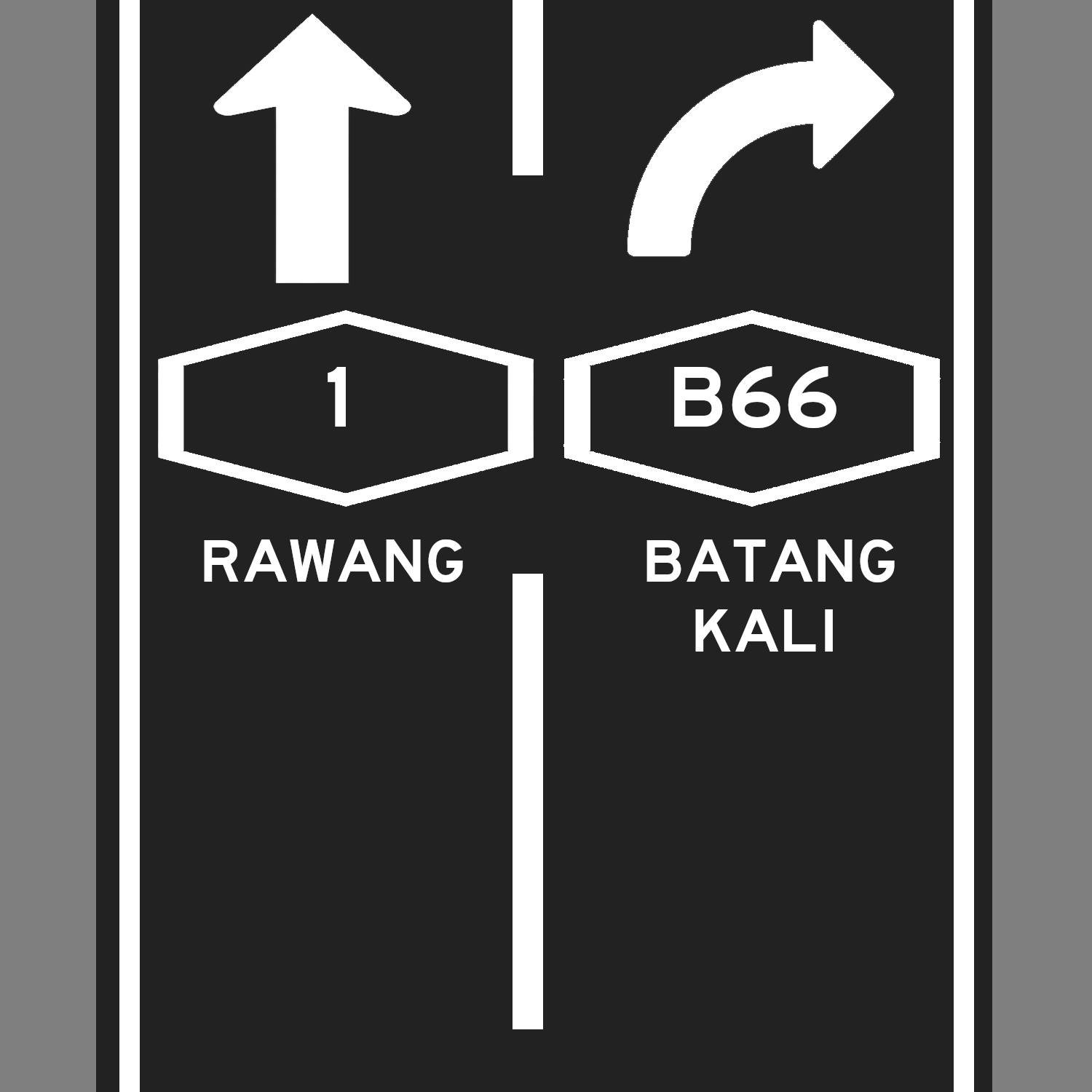
Junction direction lettering with arrow and route code (Option 2)

=== Other type road markings ===
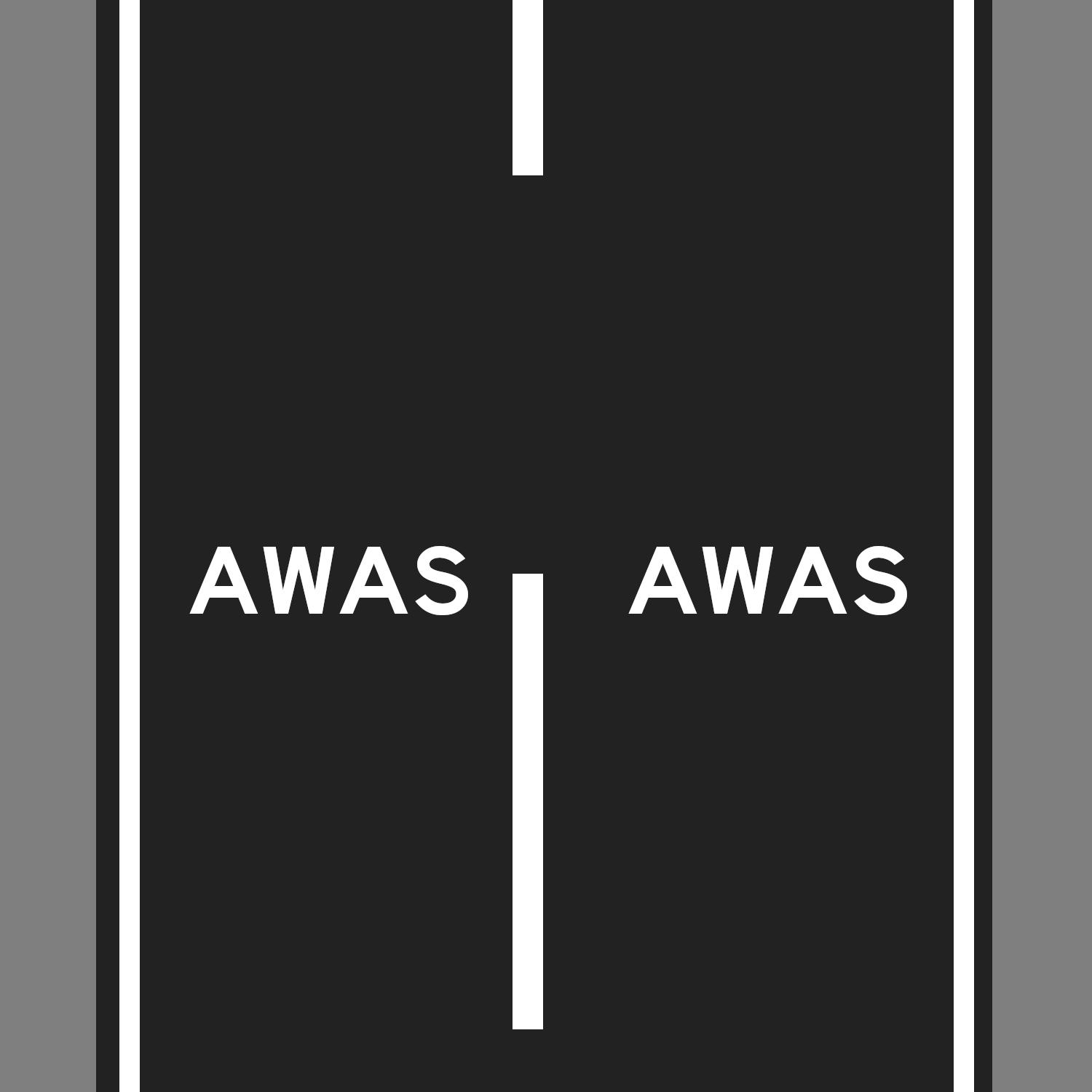
AWAS (Caution) lettering

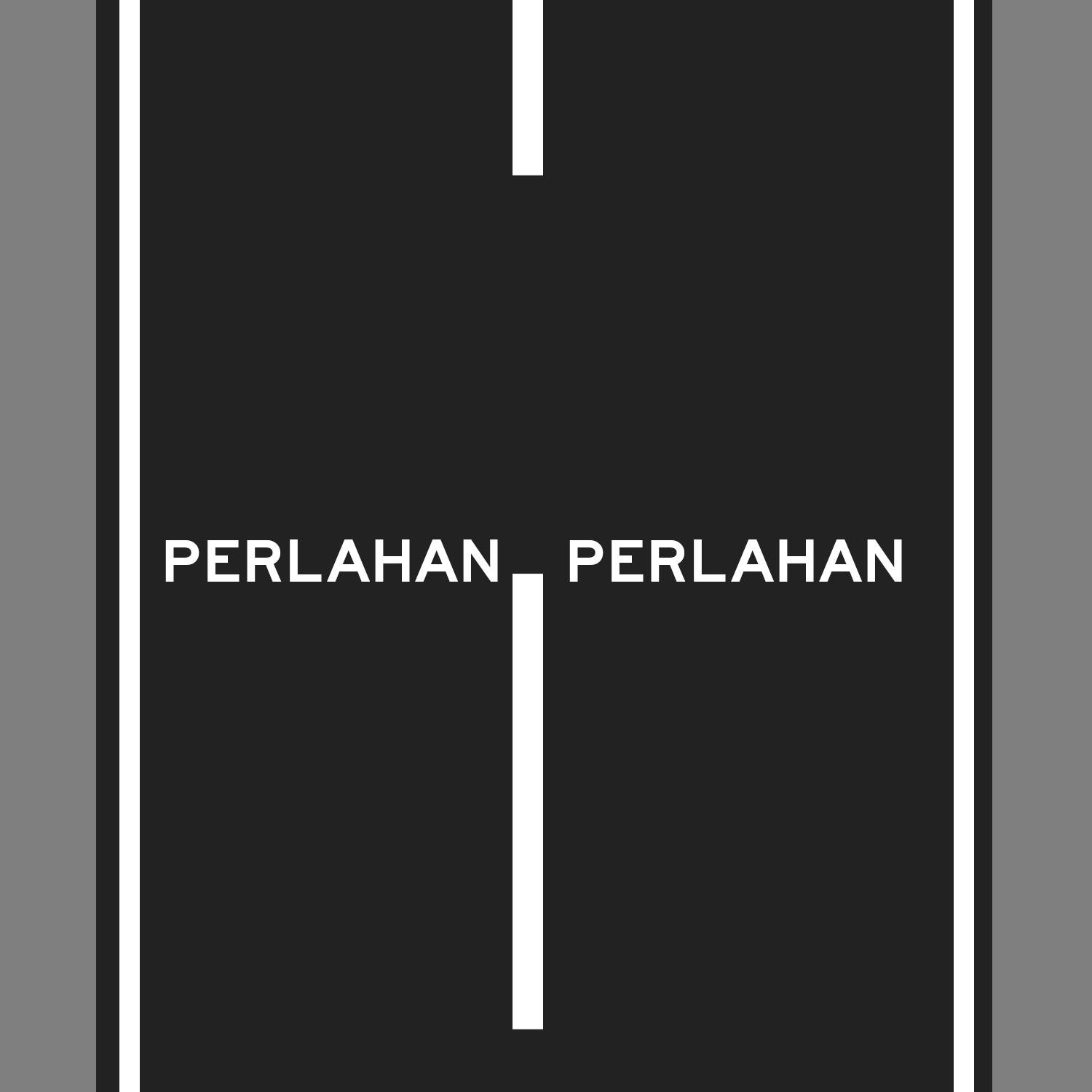
PERLAHAN (slow down) lettering

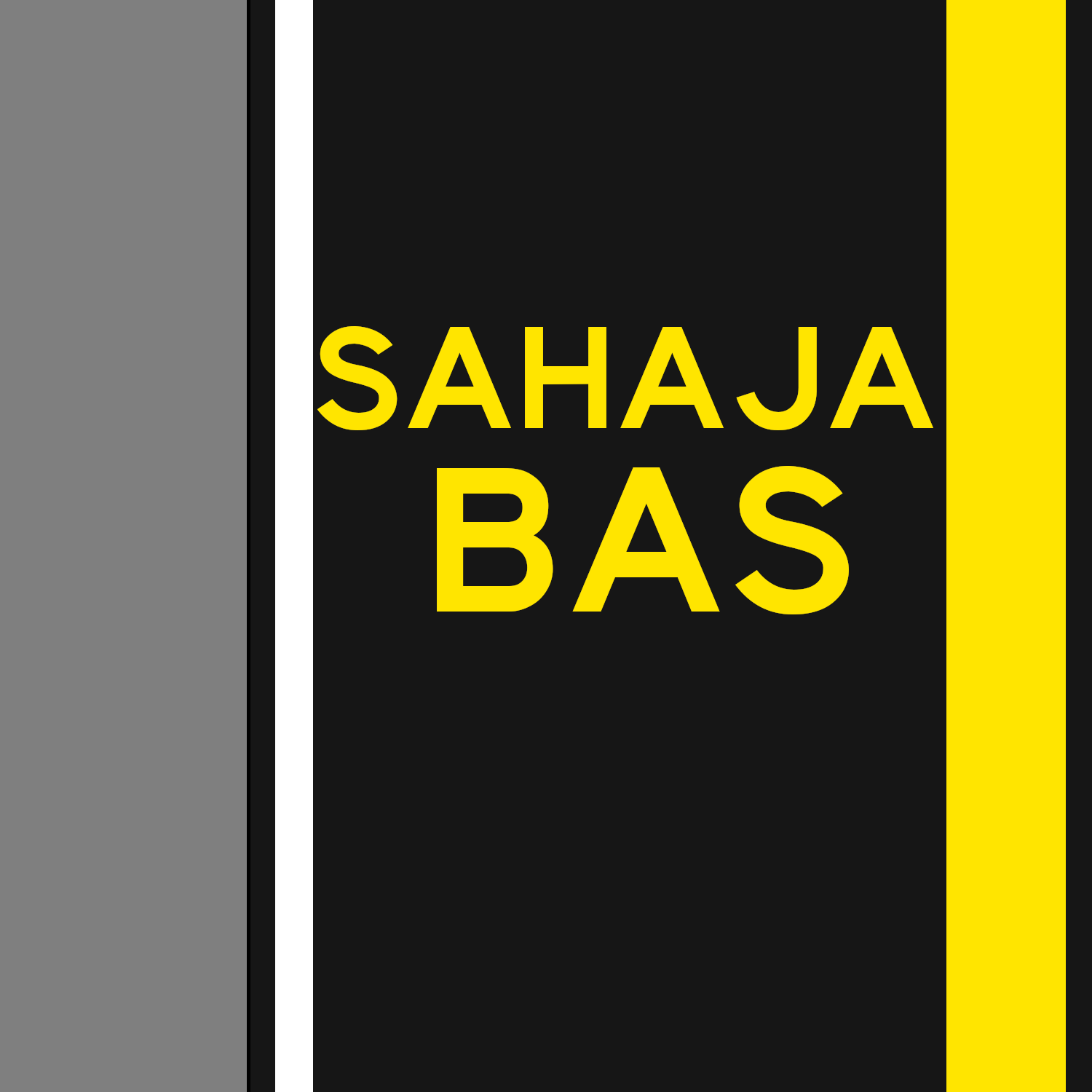
Bus lane divider

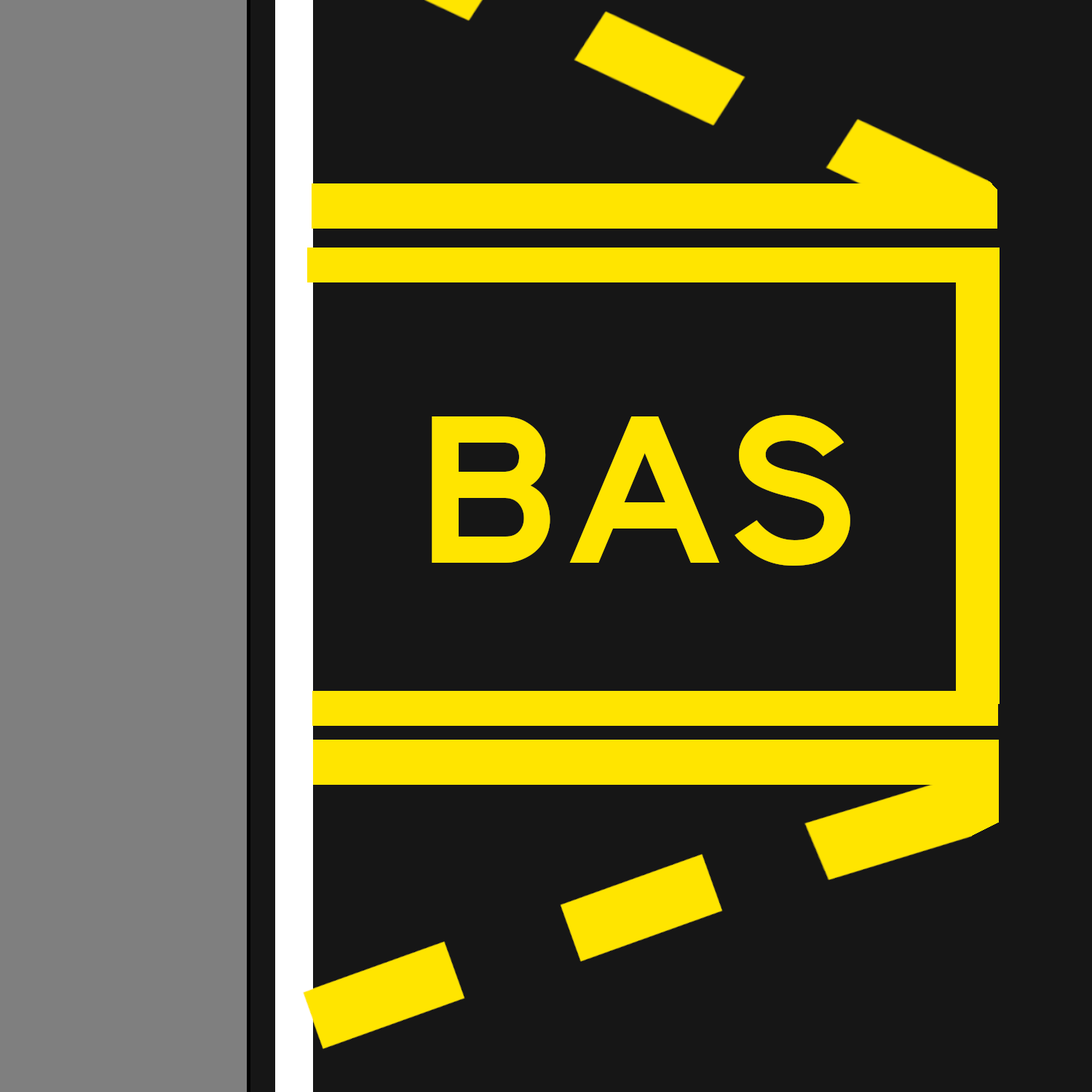
Bus stop

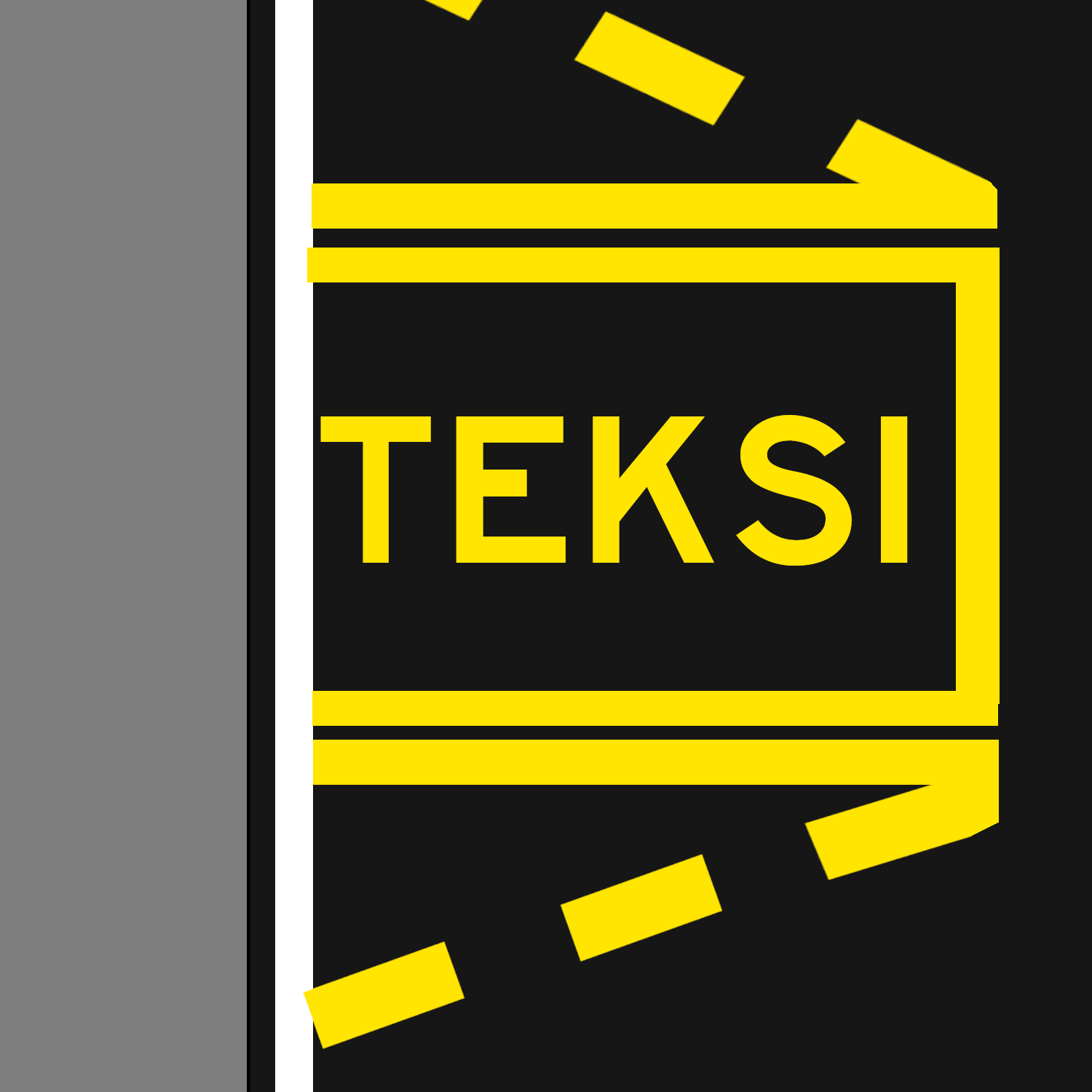
Taxi stand

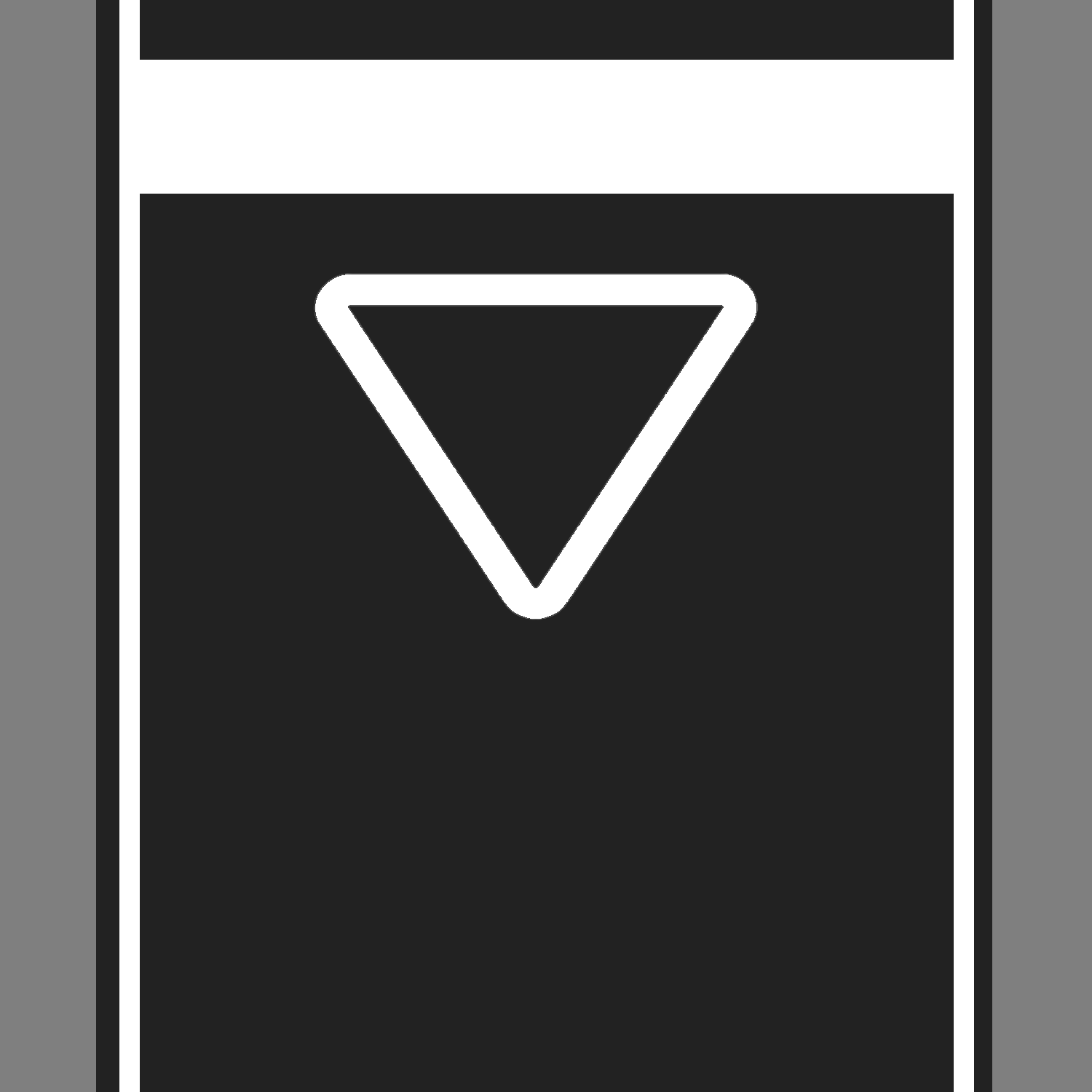
Give way

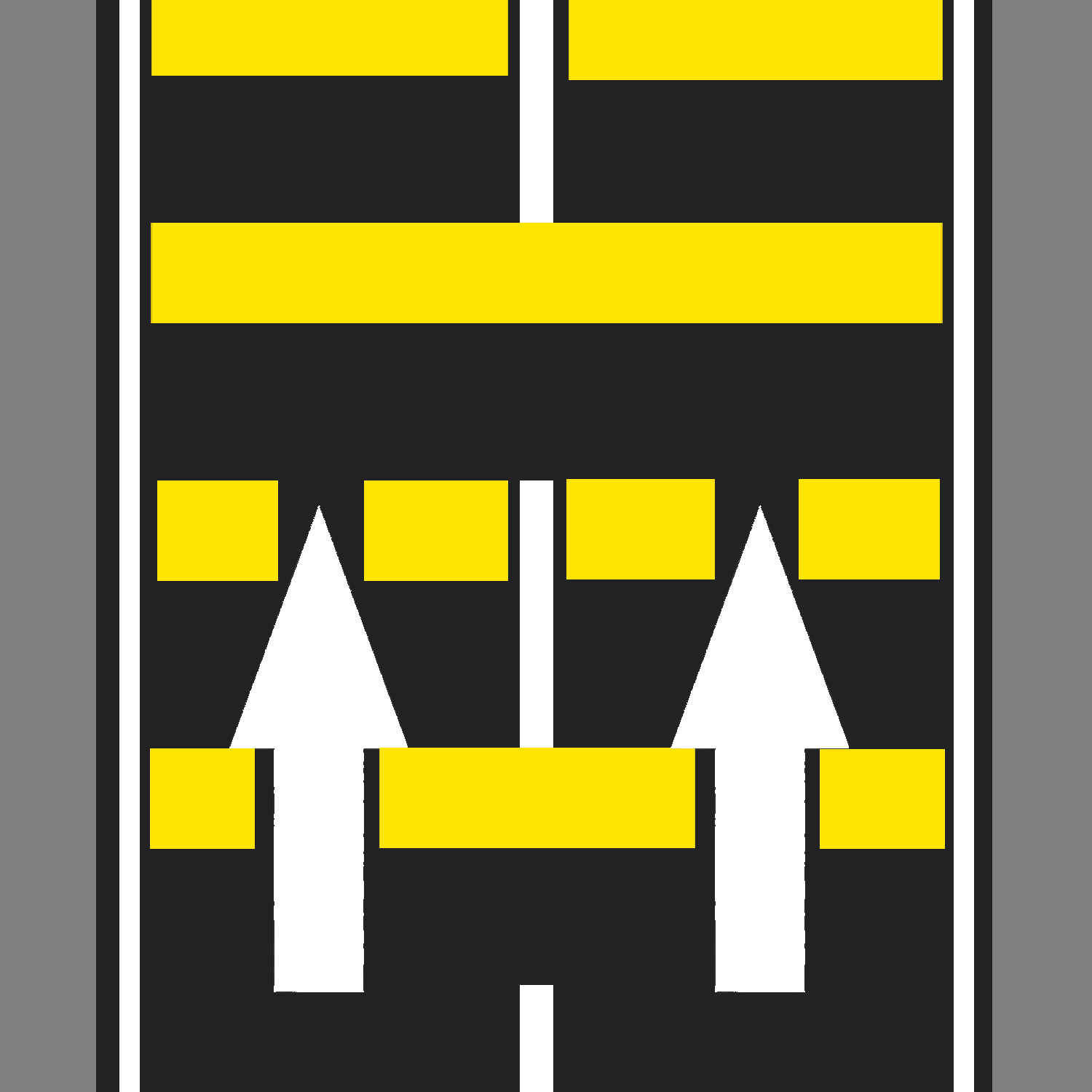
Transverse rumble strip (usually placed before junctions, toll plaza or high density areas)

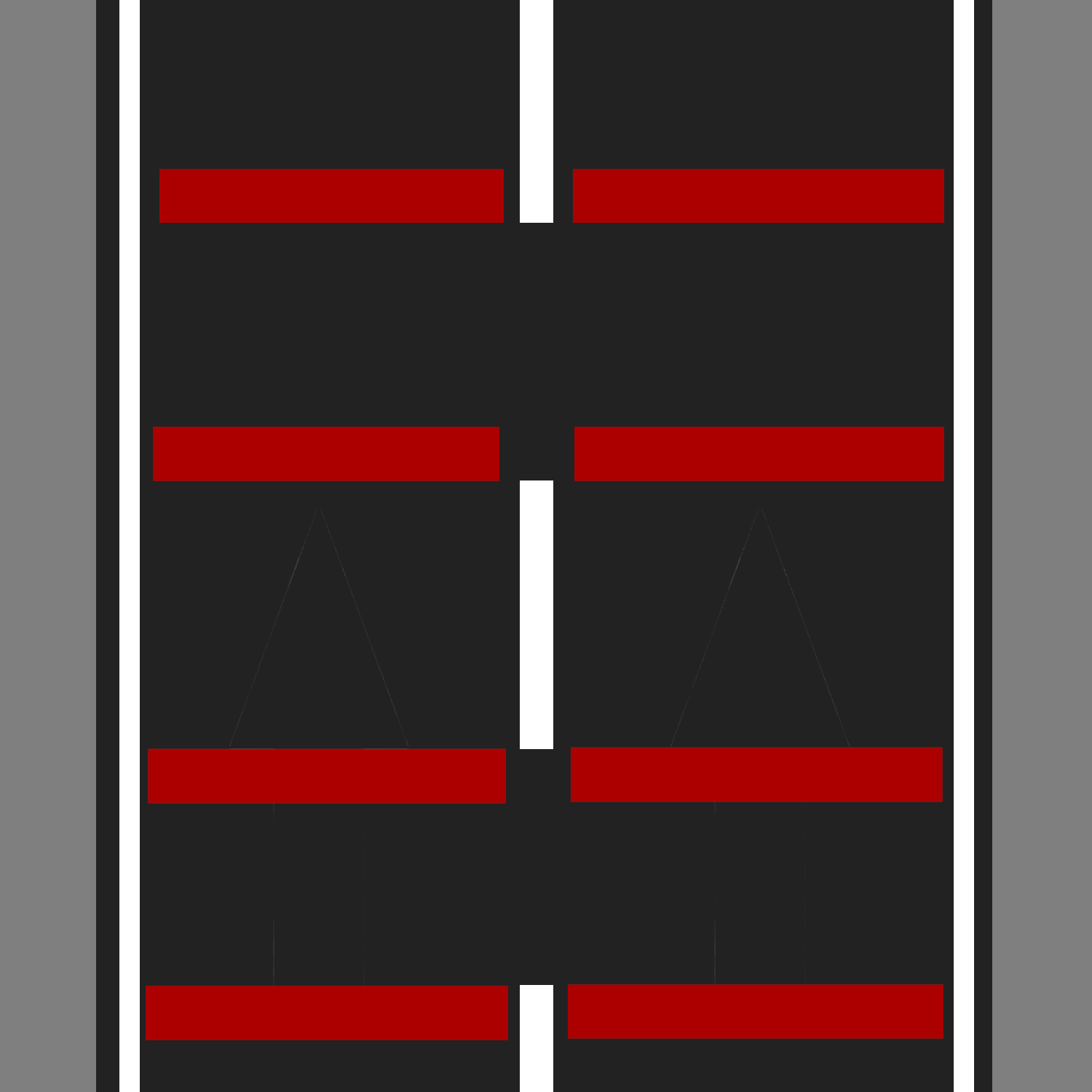
Shoulder rumble strips (usually placed on highways at very hazardous areas)

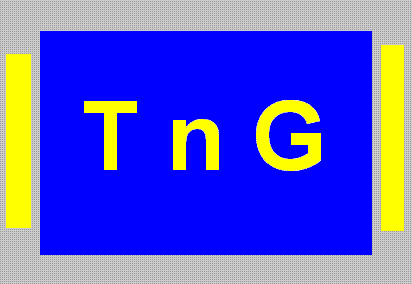
Touch n Go marker (at toll plazas)

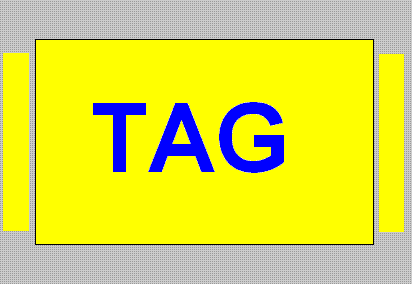
SmartTAG marker (at toll plazas)

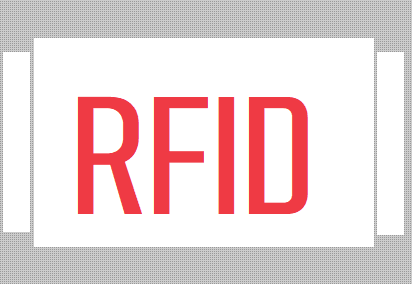
RFIDTag (also known as MyRFID) marker (at toll plazas)

== Miscellaneous ==
=== Bridge-related signs ===
These signs usually found at the bridge.

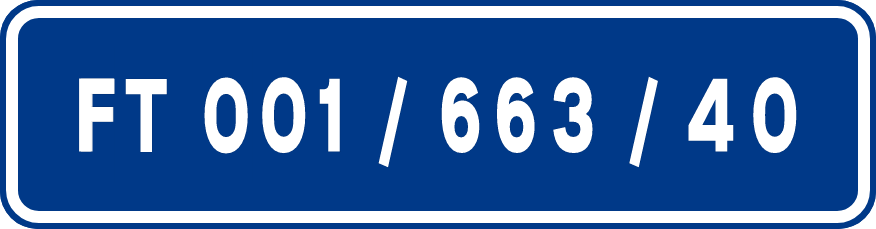
Bridge or culvert structure numbers.

=== River signs ===
These signs usually found at the bridge.

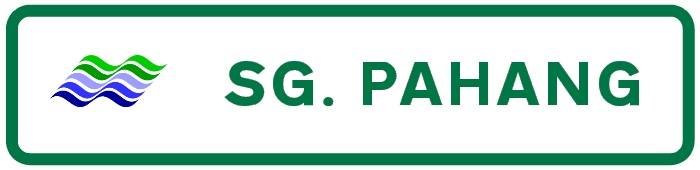
River sign with Department of Irrigation and Drainage (Jabatan Pengairan Dan Saliran) logo

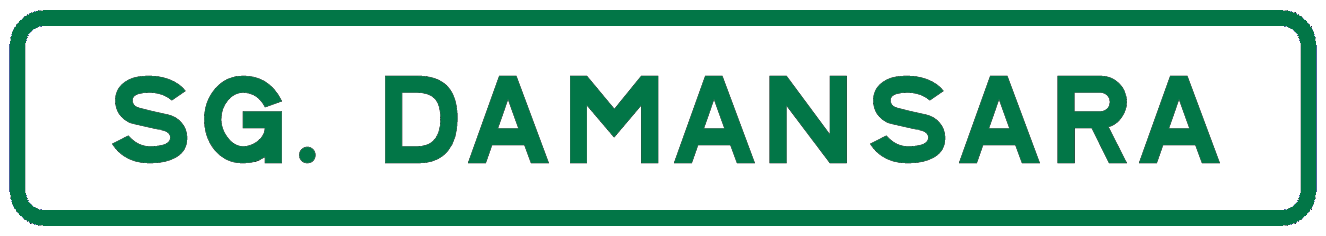
River sign (option 1)

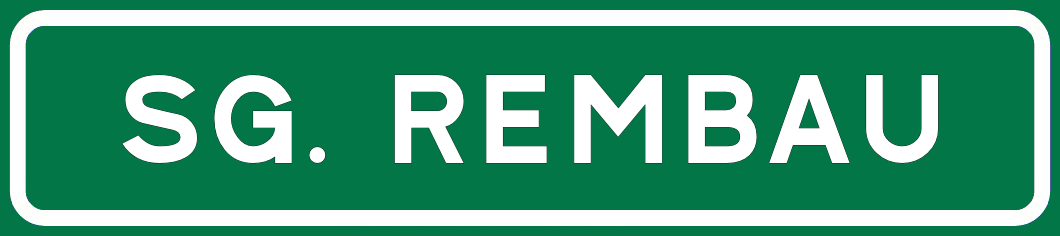
River sign (option 2)

== Gallery ==
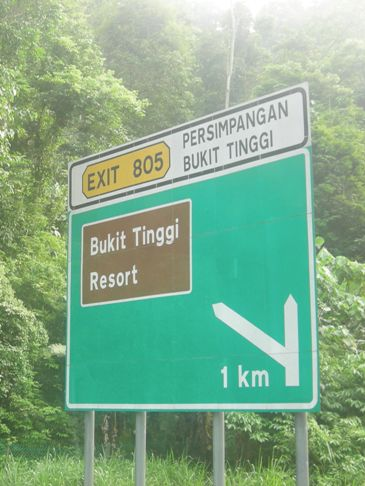
Malaysian expressway exit signs.

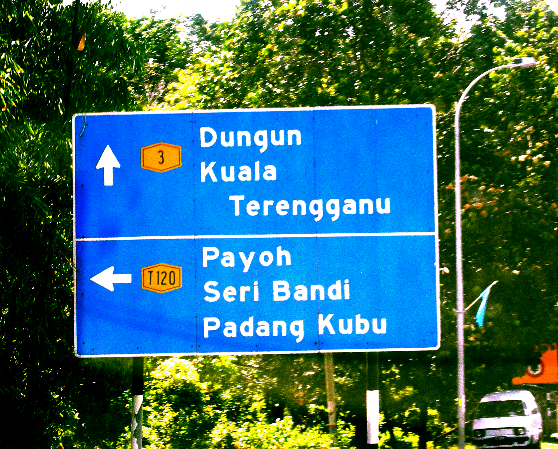
A direction signboard on Federal Route 3 in Terengganu.

A typical road sign in Kuala Lumpur, with yellow letters for major thoroughfares and green letters on white background for parks and locations of interests. Smaller signs below it show directions for pedestrians and tourists.

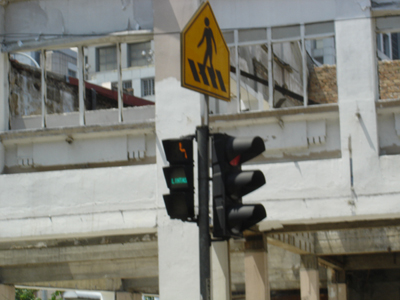
A typical pedestrian crossing traffic light in Kuala Lumpur with a countdown display and a pedestrian crossing sign above it.

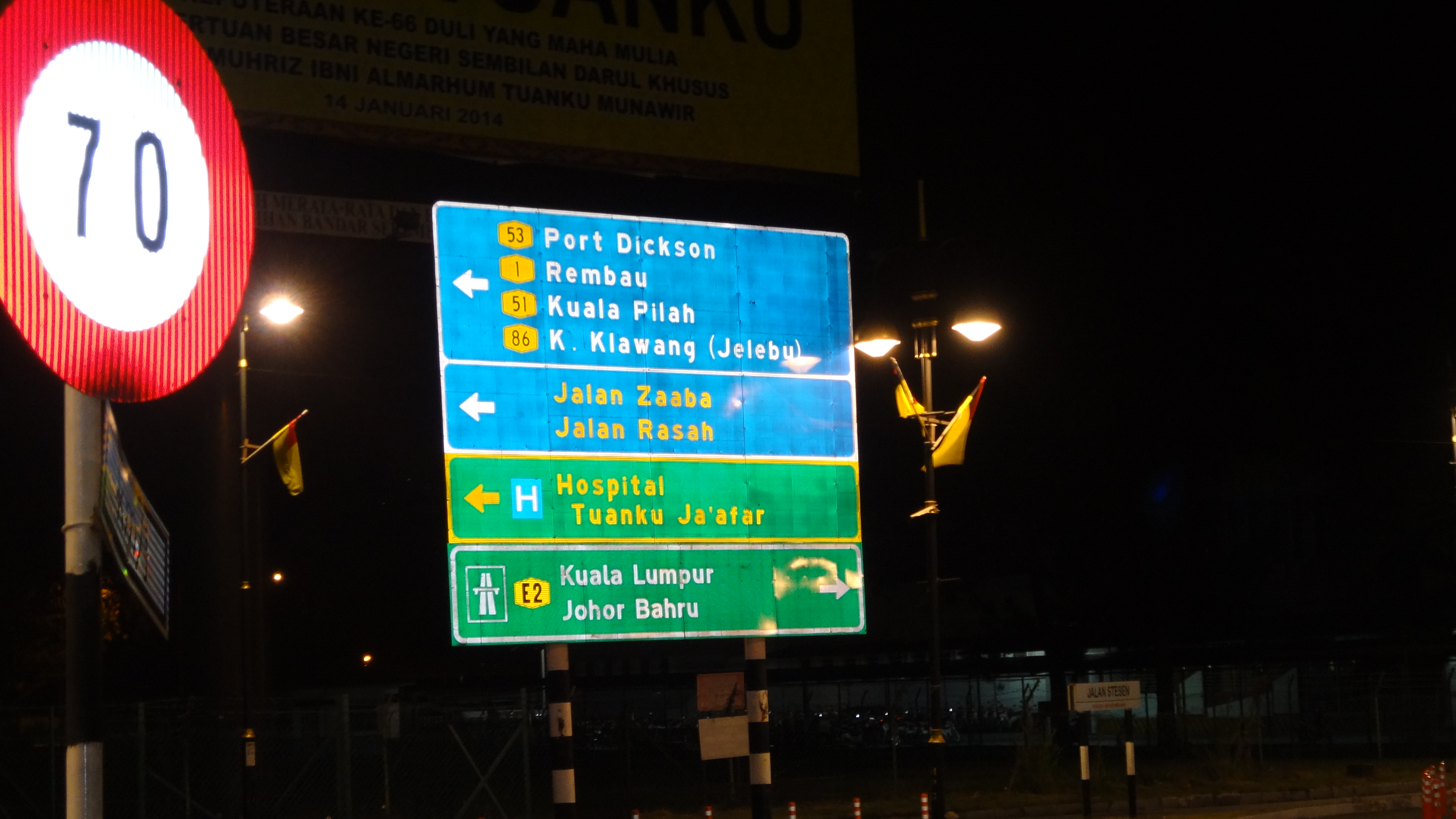
A road sign near Jalan Yam Tuan, Seremban with yellow letters for major roads and green letters on green signs for hospitals and white on green signs for expressways.

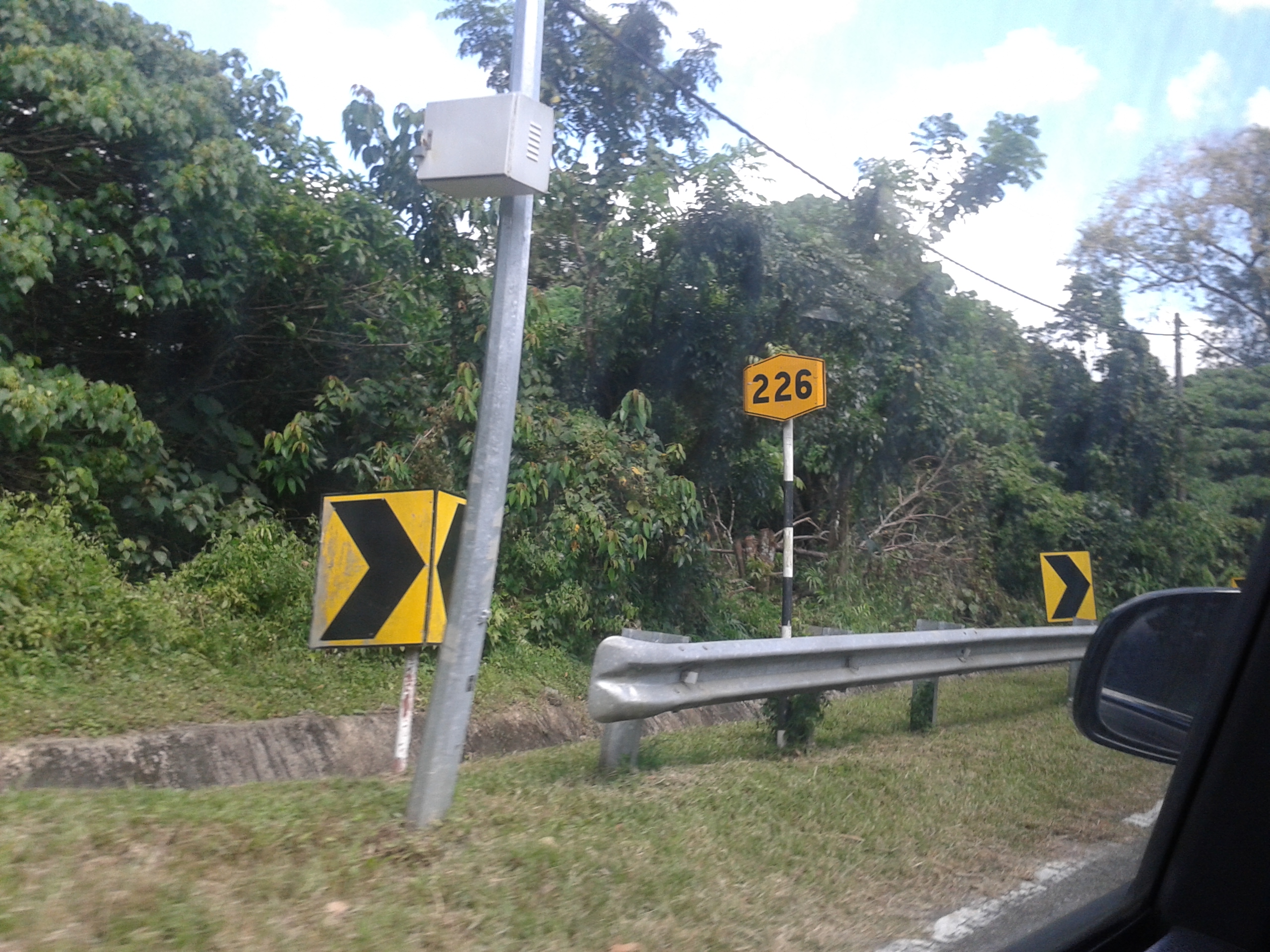
A Federal Route code sign, placed at pole along the road.

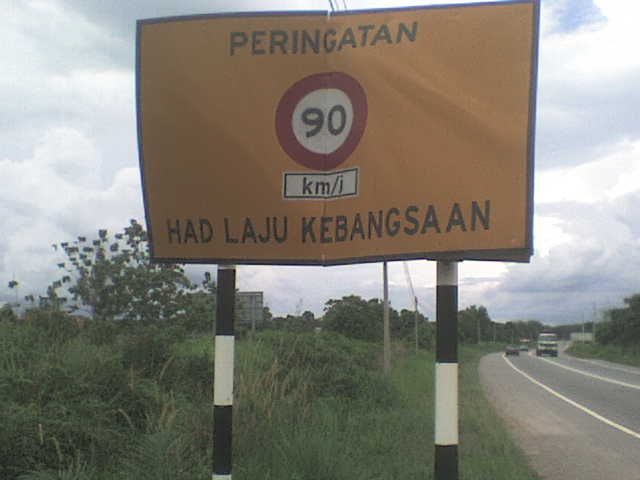
National Speed Limit signboard on Malaysian federal roads.

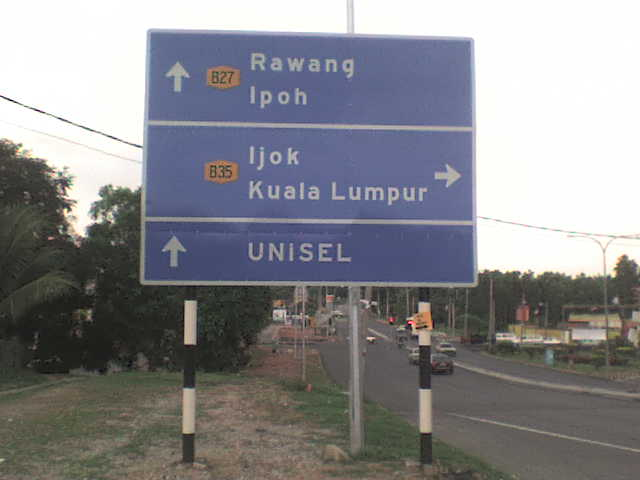
Common state road signboard which is similar to the signboards on federal roads.

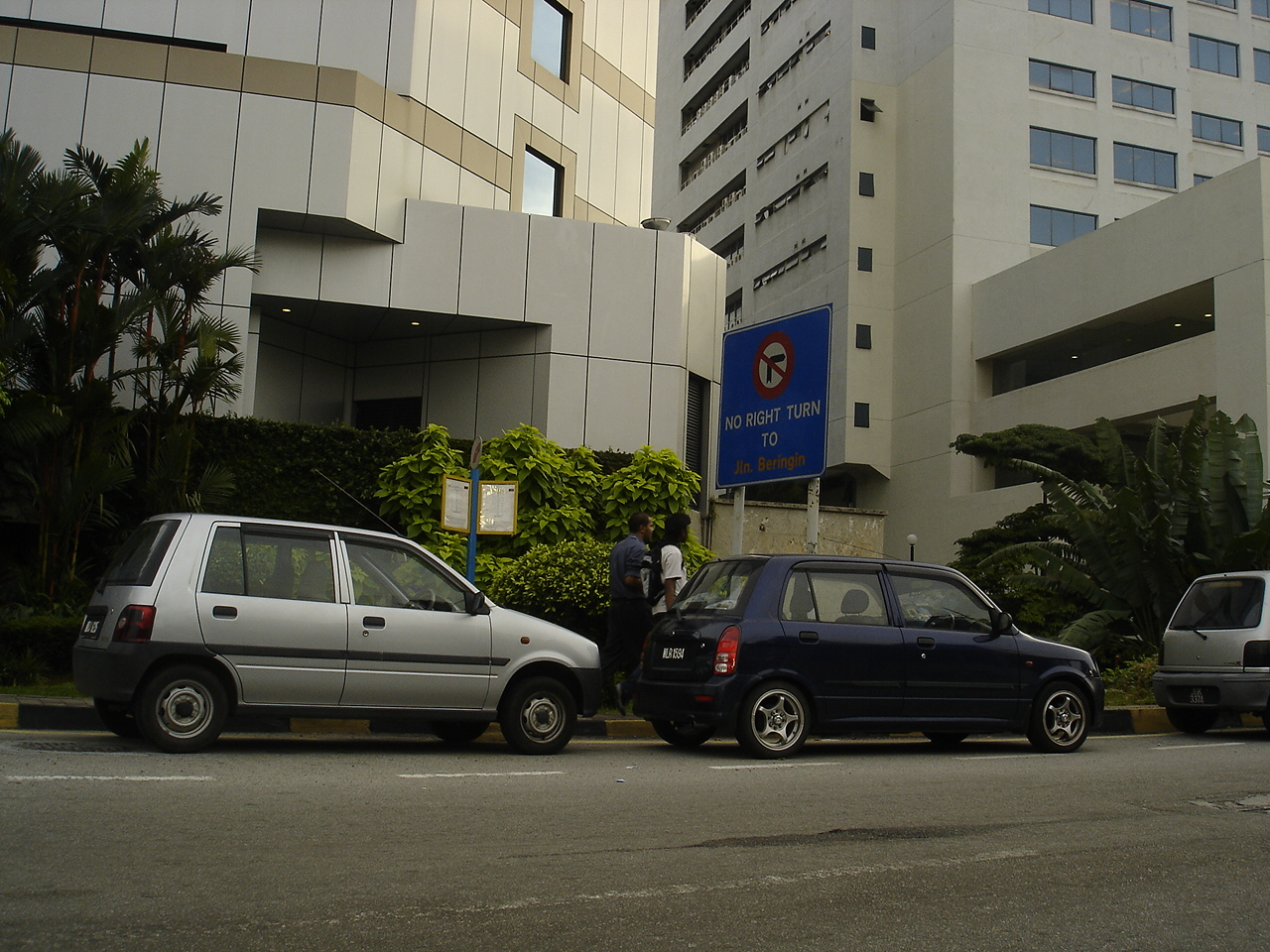
Some road signs in Malaysia are in English, such as this one near Jalan Beringin in Damansara Town Centre, Kuala Lumpur.

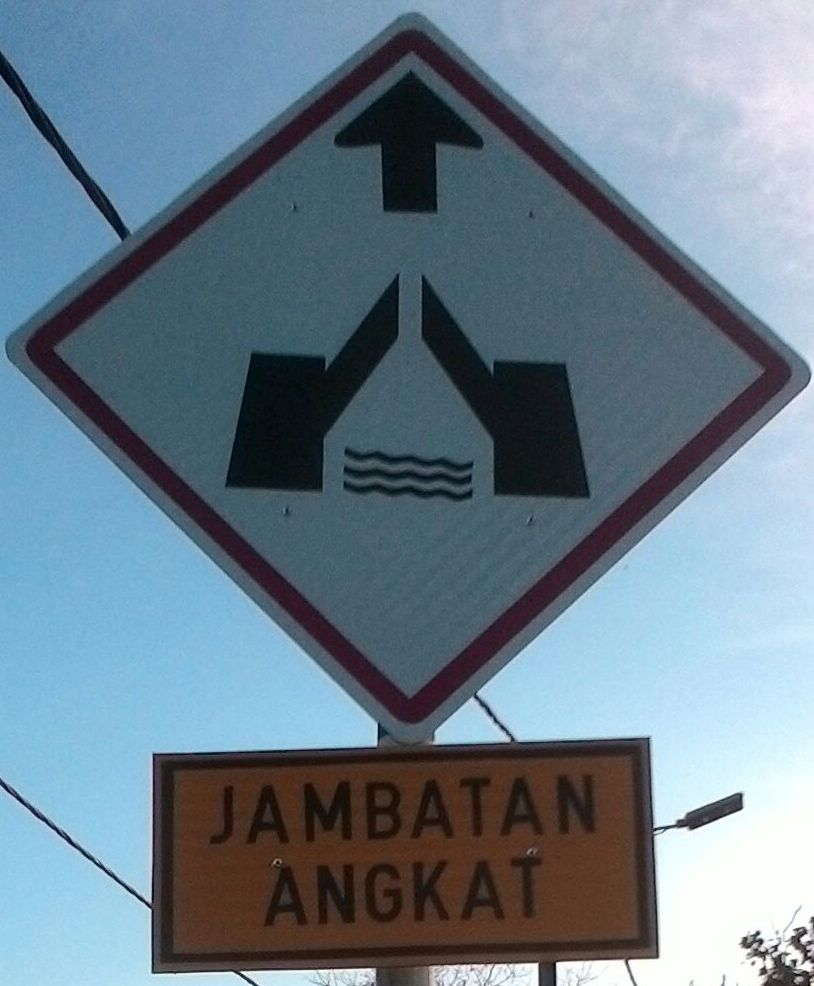
Drawbridge sign in Terengganu

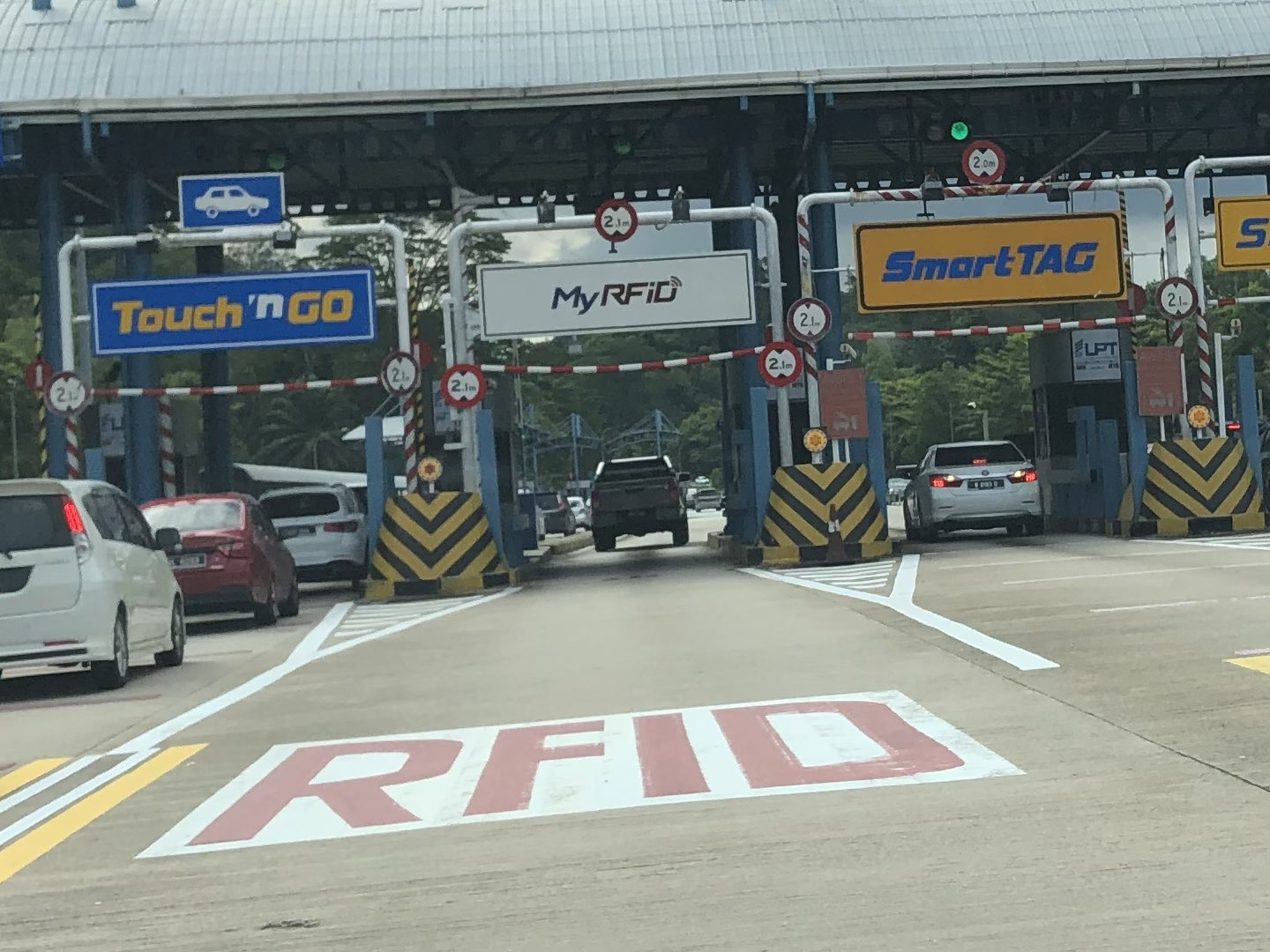
MyRFID toll booth lane at Gombak Toll Plaza

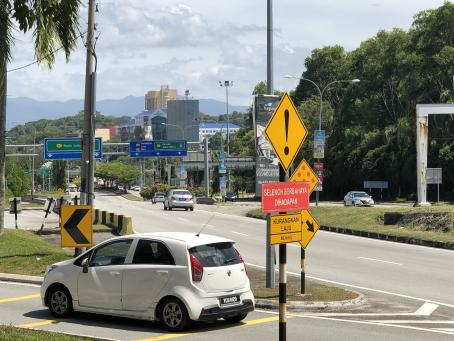
A bunch of Malaysian road signs on Federal Route 195 Seremban–Bukit Nenas Highway

== See also ==
- Integrated Transport Information System
- Malaysian Expressway System
- Malaysian Federal Roads system
- Malaysian Public Works Department
- Malaysian Road Transport Department
- National Speed Limits
- Automated Enforcement System
- Puspakom
- Transportation in Malaysia
