= Jalan Maharani =

Road in Malaysia

Major junctions
- Southwest end: Jalan Othman junctions
- Jalan Hashim; FT 5 Jalan Bakri; Jalan Sulaiman; Jalan Othman; Jalan Majidi
- Northwest end: Bulatan Yahya junctions

Location
- Country: Malaysia

Highway system
- Highways in Malaysia; Expressways; Federal; State

Jalan Maharani (Jawi: جالن مهاراني) is a major road in Bandar Maharani a royal town in Muar, Johor, Malaysia. The name was present to Maharani Fatimah, a consort to Maharaja Abu Bakar in conjunction with the opening of the Bandar Maharani in 1884.

== Attractions ==
=== Landmarks ===
- Muar Trade Centre
- Hentian Maharani and Tangga Batu
- Muar Municipal Council or Majlis Perbandaran Muar (MPMuar) Headquarters
- Royal Malaysian Customs Muar Office
- Bandar Maharani Ferry Terminal
- Laman Maharani
- Sultan Ismail Bridge
- Padang Nyiru and Muar Clock Tower

=== Maharani Uptown ===
Located at Jalan Sisi.

== Junction lists ==
The entire route is located in Muar District, Johor.

Legend:

- I/C - Interchange, I/S - Intersection, RSA - Rest and service area, OBR - Overhead bridge restaurant, R/R - Restaurant and rest plaza, L/B - Layby, V/P - Vista point, TN - tunnel, T/P - Toll plaza, BR - Bridge
- C - Cloverleaf, S - Stack, T-A - Trumpet-A, T-B - Trumpet-B, DT - Directional-T/Y, SDT - Semi-Directional-T/Y, P-Y - Partial-Y, D - Diamond, P-C - Partial cloverleaf, D-D - Diverging diamond, D-R - Direct ramp

Location	km	mi	Name	Destinations	Notes
Muar			Jalan Petrie	Jalan Petrie – Bangunan Sultan Abu Bakar, Istana Tanjung, Masjid Jamek Sultan Ibrahim, Dataran Tanjung Emas	
Muar			Parit Othman bridge		
Muar			Jalan Othman	Jalan Othman	T-junctions
Muar			Muar Trade Centre		
Muar			Hentian Maharani		
Muar			Jalan Sulaiman	Jalan Sulaiman – Jalan Abdullah, Jalan Othman, Jalan Majidi	T-junctions
Muar			Maharani Bus and Taxi Terminal		
Muar			Jalan Sisi	Jalan Sisi – Maharani Uptown	T-junctions
Muar			Muar Municipal Council (MPMuar) Headquarters		
Muar			Royal Malaysian Customs Department Muar Office		
Muar			Jalan Sayang	Jalan Sayang – Jalan Abdullah	T-junctions
Muar			Arked Mara Muar		
Muar			Jalan Haji Abu	Jalan Haji Abu	T-junctions
Muar			Dataran Maharani; Tangga Batu		
Muar			Jalan Yahya	Jalan Yahya – Jalan Abdullah	T-junctions
Muar			Padang Nyiru; Muar Clock Tower		
Muar			Bulatan Yahya I/S	FT 5 Malaysia Federal Route 5 – Malacca, Tangkak, Segamat; North–South Expressway Southern Route / AH2 – Kuala Lumpur, Johor Bahru	Junctions
Muar			Through to J24 Jalan Salleh		
1.000 mi = 1.609 km; 1.000 km = 0.621 mi: Route transition
