= Sultanah Fatimah Specialist Hospital =

Hospital in Muar, Johor, Malaysia

Sultanah Fatimah Specialist Hospital Hospital Pakar Sultanah Fatimah (HPSF)
- Ministry of Health
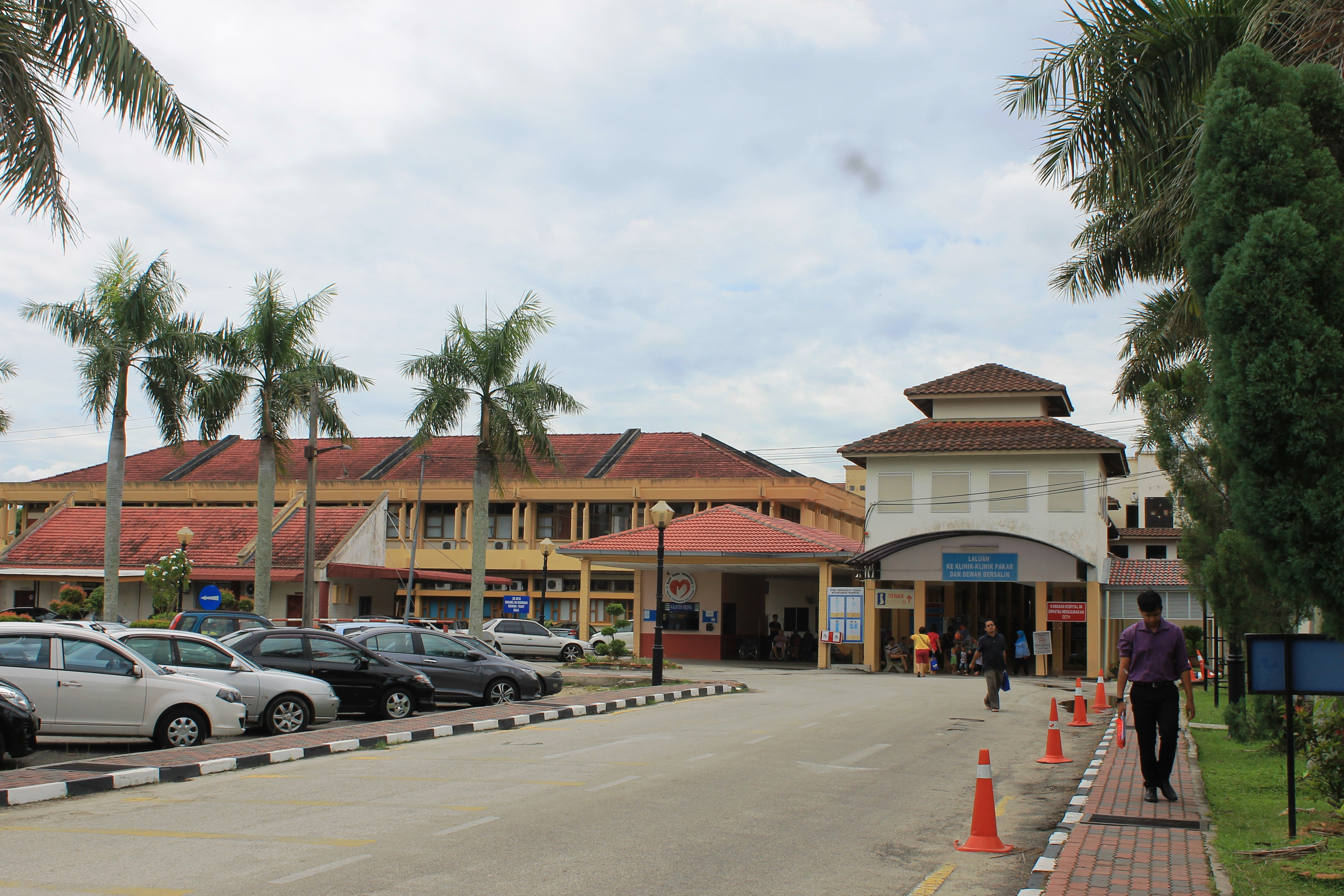
- Main entrance of Sultanah Fatimah Specialist Hospital

- Location of HPSF in Malaysia

Geography
- Location: Bandar Maharani, Muar, Johor, Malaysia
- Coordinates: 2.0567°N 102.5772°E

Organisation
- Type: District General, Specialist, Teaching Hospital
- Affiliated university: Asia Metropolitan University (AMU); Manipal University College Malaysia (MUCM)

Services
- Emergency department: Yes
- Beds: 550

History
- Founded: 1900

Links
- Website: hpsf.moh.gov.my Sultanah Fatimah Specialist Hospital on Facebook

Sultanah Fatimah Specialist Hospital (Malay: Hospital Pakar Sultanah Fatimah; abbrev: HPSF) is a government-funded specialist hospital in Bandar Maharani, Muar, Johor, Malaysia. It is managed by the Ministry of Health of Malaysia.

Muar also known as the Royal Town of Bandar Maharani is located about 175 km from Johor Bahru, the state capital of Johor. It has an area of 2346.12 km^{2} and population of 437 164 people (c. 2007). HPSF is the third most important hospital in Johor after Sultanah Aminah Hospital and Sultan Ismail Hospital, both in Johor Bahru. It is also a referral hospital for to neighbouring districts Batu Pahat, Segamat and Tangkak hospitals in the northern region of Johor state.

== History ==
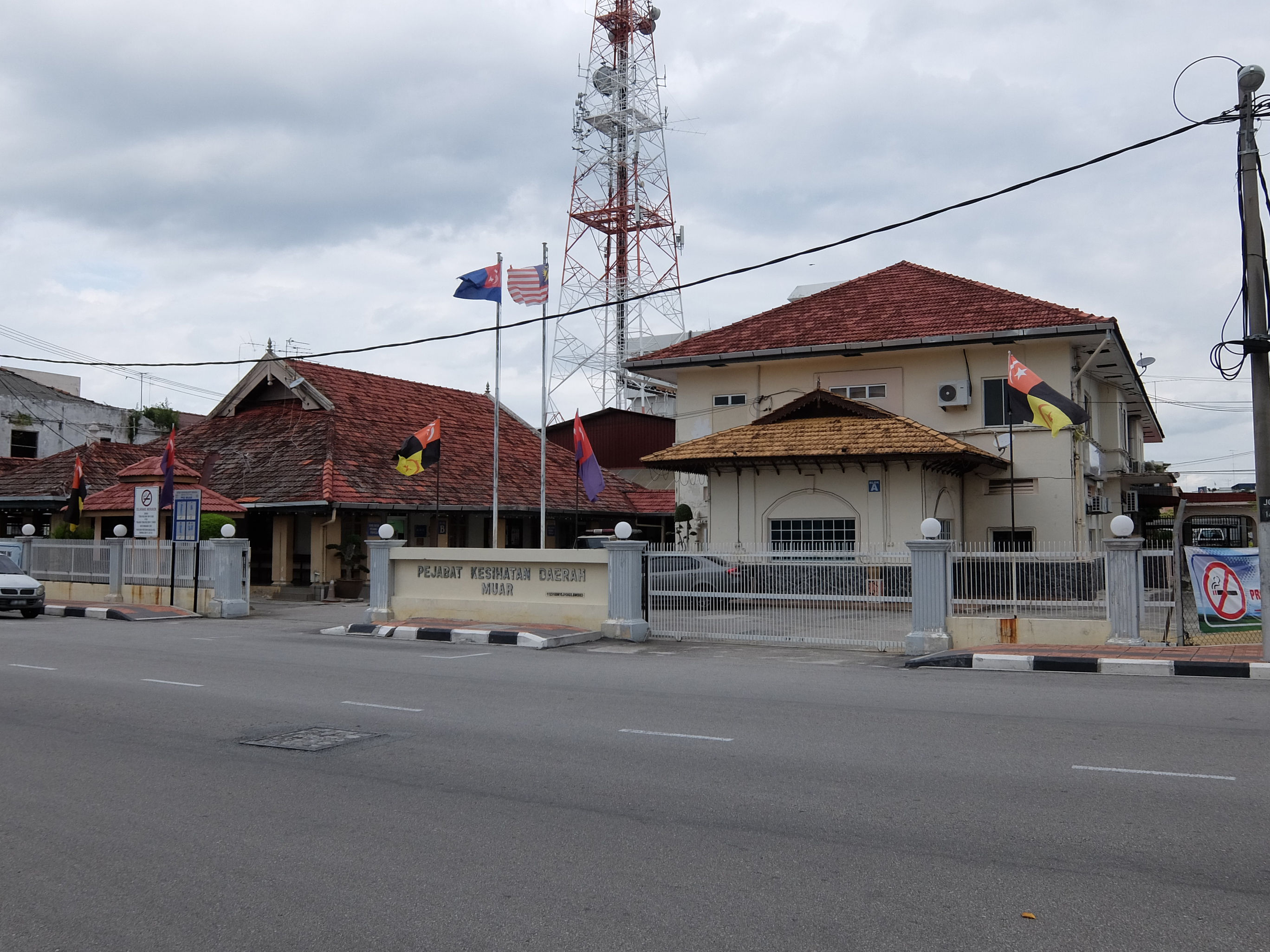
Muar District Health Office at the intersection with Jalan Othman and Jalan Meriam

The hospital has its origins in a dispensary established in 1900 in a small building at Jalan Petri, Muar. It was known as the ‘Government Dispensary’ at that time and situated at the present HSBC Bank opposite the Muar Trade Centre building at the intersection with Jalan Othman, the street where the present Muar District Health Office is also located just a stone's throw away.

The whole health service was later shifted to the current location at Jalan Salleh in 1918, after a new building built at Muar River side when the town of Muar was being restructured.

Beginning in the 1920s, the hospital which was once known as the Muar District Hospital has gone through a variety of development until today. It went through tremendous transformation into a specialist hospital under the tenure of Chua Jui Meng as Minister of Health (1995 – 2004), who was also a local-bred Member of Parliament (MP) for Bakri formerly. On 13 October 2003 the hospital status and name was converted from 'Hospital Muar' to the present 'Hospital Pakar Sultanah Fatimah' with the declaration was officially completed by the Sultanah of Johor then, Sultanah Zanariah. (Note: Sultanah title then was removed and change to Tengku Puan Zanariah later.)

== Departments, units and services ==
Hospital Redevelopment Project Master Plan began since 1990 which the planned Ambulatory Care Centre Block would have equip the hospital with a variety of advanced medical equipments and facilities to cater for specialist services. The Baby Friendly Program was established at the hospital officially by the Minister of Health then on 6 November 1997. Departments and units at HPSF included:

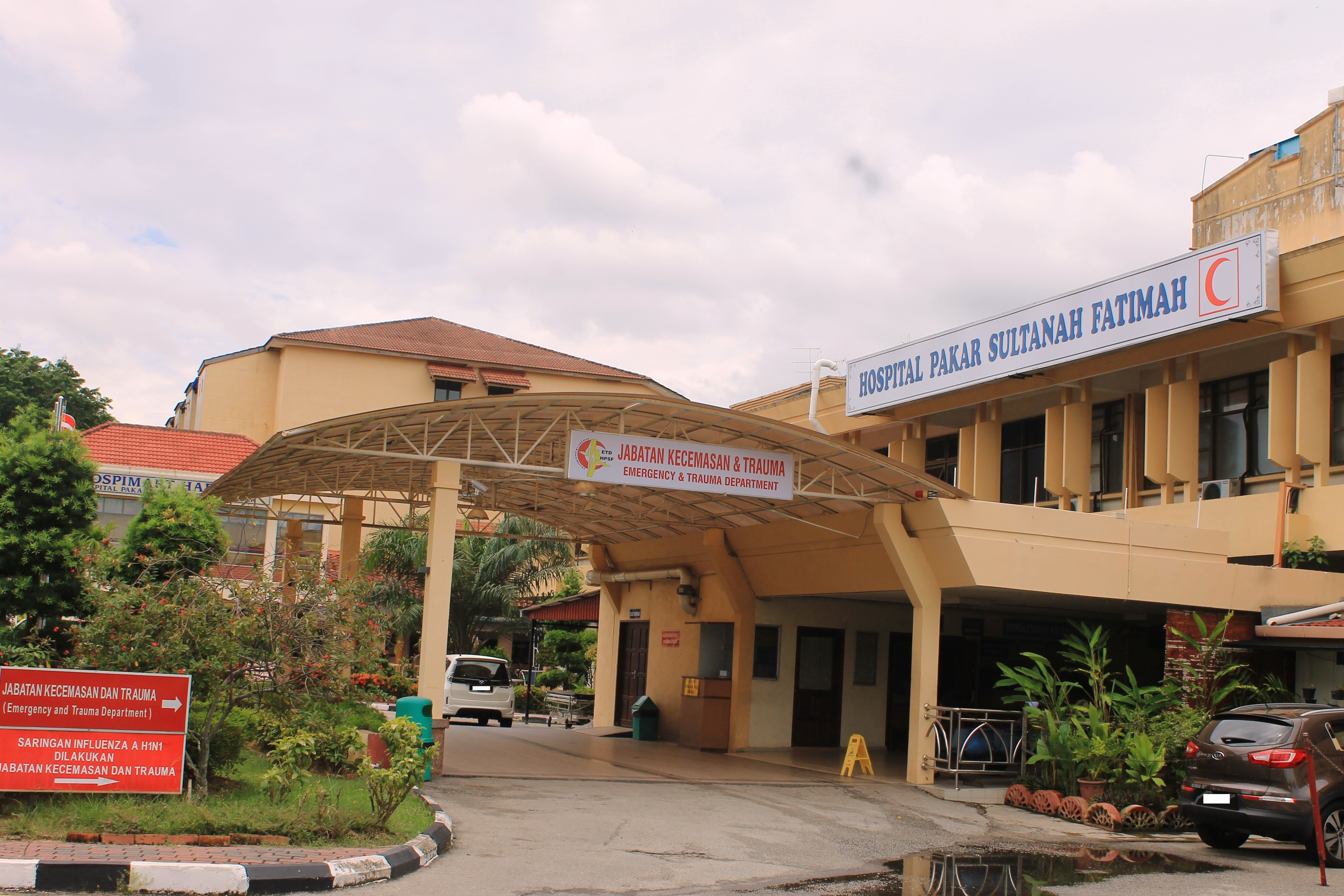
24-hour Emergency and Trauma Department (previously the main entrance) of HPSF

Clinical: • Medical • Ophthalmology • Anaesthesiology • Dermatology • Otorhinolaryngology • Psychiatrist • Orthopedics • Paediatrics • SOPD • Emergency & Trauma • Obstetrics & Gynaecology

Clinical Support: • Patology • Imaging & Diagnostic • Pharmacy • Health Education • Rehabilition & • Medical Social Work • Physiotherapist

Support: • Dietetics & Food • Supervision & Transportation • CSSD • Revenue • Quality • Medical Record • Nursing • Library • ICT • Public Health • Management

== Teaching hospital ==
In addition HPSF also plays the role as 'teaching hospital' being affiliated with medical schools i.e. Asia Metropolitan University and Manipal University College Malaysia (formerly Melaka Manipal Medical College) to provide medical education and training their medical students doing twinning programme between its campus here and its sister campus in Manipal, Karnataka, India.

== Housemanship training ==
HPSF also provides Internship training for Medical Graduate Officer either from a Malaysian public or private university, or from an overseas-approved university or college under the medical service "secondary center" concept.

== See also ==
- List of hospitals in Malaysia
- Healthcare in Malaysia
