= Muar =

Muar may refer to

- Muar District, a district in Johor, Malaysia
- Muar (town), a town in the Muar District
- Muar (federal constituency), a parliament federal constituency in Johor, Malaysia
- Muar River (Malaysia), is a river which flows through Muar District, Malaysia

== Other ==
- Muar River (Mozambique), is a stream which flows through in Sofala province, Mozambique

== See also ==
- Muar Municipal Council
- Muar Municipal Council FC
- Muar Bypass
- Muar State Railway
- Muar Trade Centre
