= Gerisek =

Gerisik or Gersik or Grisek may refer to one of these two different places or locations in the area or region of Muar, Johor, Malaysia.

- Gersik, the official spelling for Kampung Sungai Gersik a place or village located in Sri Menanti, Sungai Balang, Parit Jawa, Muar, Johor, Malaysia.
- Grisek, the official spelling for Mukim Grisek a place or town located in Tangkak District, Johor, Malaysia.
