= Muara =

Muara means estuary in the Malay and Indonesian languages and may refer to:

== Places ==
Brunei Darussalam

- Muara, Brunei, a town in the Brunei-Muara District, Brunei
- Brunei-Muara District, northern-most district in Brunei
- Muara Naval Base, headquarters and main operating base of the Royal Brunei Navy

Indonesia

- Muara Bungo Airport, an airport in Muara Bungo, Jambi, Indonesia
- Muara (district), a district in the North Tapanuli Regency of North Sumatra province, Sumatra, Indonesia
- Muara Enim, capital of Muara Enim Regency, South Sumatra province, Sumatra, Indonesia
- Muara Karang, an administrative village of Penjaringan, North Jakarta, Indonesia
- Muara Kemumu, a sub-district of Kepahiang Regency, Bengkulu, Indonesia
- Muara Satui, an anchorage coal loading port in South Kalimantan, Indonesia
- Muara Takus, a Buddhist temple complex in Riau province, Sumatra, Indonesia

Malaysia

- Muara Tebas, estuary at the mouth of the Sarawak River in Malaysia

== Other uses ==
- "Muara Hati", 2012 song by Malaysian artists Siti Nurhaliza and Hafiz Suip

== See also ==
- Muar (disambiguation)
