= Muar Bypass =

Road in Malaysia

Federal Route 224
- Muar Bypass

Route information
- Maintained by Malaysian Public Works Department
- Length: 13.88 km (8.62 mi)
- Existed: 2002–present
- History: Completed in 2005

Major junctions
- Beltway around Bandar Maharani Muar
- North end: Parit Bunga
- FT 5 FT 19 AMJ Highway; FT 23 Federal Route 23; Jalan Bakar Batu; Jalan Ismail Desa; J24 State Route J24; J32 State Route J32; J22 Jalan Sungai Abong; FT 24 Federal Route 24; Jalan Dato' Hj Kosai; J31 State Route J31; FT 5 Federal Route 5
- South end: Parit Sakai

Location
- Country: Malaysia
- Primary destinations: Pagoh, Yong Peng, Parit Jawa, Batu Pahat

Highway system
- Highways in Malaysia; Expressways; Federal; State

Muar Bypass (Malay: Jalan Pintasan Muar; Chinese: 麻坡绕道), or Federal Route 224, is a major highway bypass and the first highway built in Bandar Maharani Muar, a royal town in Johor, Malaysia. The 13.8 km (8.6 mi) highway bypass linking Parit Bunga in the northwest to Parit Sakai in the southeast. The Kilometre Zero of the Federal Route 224 starts at Parit Sakai junctions.

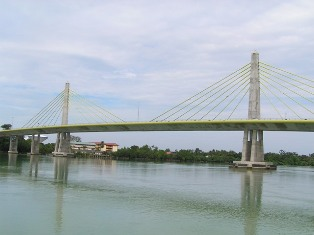
Muar Second Bridge on Muar Bypass.

== History ==
Between the 1990s and the 2000s, traffic congestion was prevalent at the Sultan Ismail Bridge and Muar town centre since the official opening of the North–South Expressway Southern Route between Ayer Keroh and Pagoh and the opening of the Tangkak and Pagoh Interchange on 1 April 1989. To this end, in 1998, the federal government announced that the new second bridge would be built at Parit Bunga to ease congestion on the existing bridge. In addition, a new bypass linking Parit Bunga to Parit Sakai would be built.

The Public Works Department of Malaysia (JKR) and the main contractor Ranhill Bersekutu Sdn Bhd Co began construction of the bypass in 2002. The second bridge and the bypass were opened to traffic in 2004, while the rest of the project was completed in 2005.

In 2008, the highway was gazetted as the federal roads by JKR as Federal Route 224.

== Project highlights ==
Construction of a 632-metre landmark single-plane semi harp cable-stayed bridge with a 132-metre mid-span across Muar River and a 13-kilometre road bypassing the town of Muar inclusive of one Parit Bunga Interchange.

This project had two key briefs:-

- to alleviate traffic congestion in the Muar area by constructing a major bypass road with an elevated interchange over the existing junction.
- to design and build a landmark bridge across Muar River.

The project involved Ranhill Bersekutu Sdn Bhd Co undertaking the engineering, design, construction, engineering, and environmental impact assessments and controls. Creativity was the key to the bridge design, with a need for aesthetic as well as functional considerations. With the rapid growth in the region, the bridge is set to become a defining feature of the local landscape, and had to be designed with this level of impact in mind. The result is a spectacular structure that is sympathetic to its surroundings, taking into account various environmental aspects. Use of new technology, combined with the unique method of construction - a cast-in-situ bridge deck segmental box girder – using the traveler formworks has increased ease of construction, minimised use of materials and proved to be cost-effective.

At the same time, the construction of the 13 kilometre bypass road also includes seven grade signalised intersections and five grade unsignalised junctions, cross culverts and drainage, as well as an elevated interchange over the existing junction. Ranhill also conducted a separate traffic study to ensure that the needs of the local community were being fully met.

With construction taking place within a mangrove area, the bridge and the earthworks for the road construction is carefully monitored through a specific government-approved environmental management plan, with the objective of retaining as much of the natural surroundings as possible.

== Features ==
The main feature of the bypass is the Muar Second Bridge. Other features include a pedestrian bridge and the Parit Bunga complex interchange, which is the first of its kind in Muar. The bypass is a 4-lane carriageway with reserves land for future widening and construction of new interchanges.

At most sections, the Federal Route 224 was built under the JKR R5 road standard, allowing maximum speed limit of up to 90 km/h.

== Junction lists ==
The entire route is located in Johor.

Legend:

- I/C - Interchange, I/S - Intersection, RSA - Rest and service area, OBR - Overhead bridge restaurant, R/R - Restaurant and rest plaza, L/B - Layby, V/P - Vista point, TN - tunnel, T/P - Toll plaza, BR - Bridge
- C - Cloverleaf, S - Stack, T-A - Trumpet-A, T-B - Trumpet-B, DT - Directional-T/Y, SDT - Semi-Directional-T/Y, P-Y - Partial-Y, D - Diamond, P-C - Partial cloverleaf, D-D - Diverging diamond, D-R - Direct ramp

District	Km	Exit	Name	Destinations	Notes
Muar	0.0	11	Parit Sakai I/S	FT 5 Jalan Abdul Rahman – Bandar Maharani Bandar Diraja (Town Centre) (Royal Town), Tanjung Emas, Parit Jawa, Batu Pahat, Pontian, Johor Bahru, Kukup	T-junctions
Muar		10	Jalan Temenggong Ahmad I/S	J31 Jalan Temenggong Ahmad – Bandar Maharani Bandar Diraja (Town Centre) (Royal Town), Parit Bakar, Parit Jawa, Batu Pahat	Junctions
Muar		9	Jalan Dato' Haji Kosai I/S	J140 Jalan Dato' Haji Kosai – Parit Bakar Darat, Parit Jawa	Junctions
Muar		8	Simpang Jeram I/S	FT 24 Jalan Muar–Yong Peng – Bandar Maharani Bandar Diraja (Town Centre) (Royal Town), Bakri, Parit Sulong, Yong Peng	Junctions
Muar		BR	Sungai Abong Bridge; Parit Keliling Sungai Abong Bridge		
Muar		7	Sungai Abong I/S	J22 Jalan Sungai Abong – Sungai Abong, Malaysian Road Transport Department (JPJ) district branch office	Junctions
Muar		6	Kampung Tengah I/S	Jalan Kampung Tengah – Kampung Tengah, Sungai Abong, Malaysian Road Transport Department (JPJ) district branch office	Junctions
Muar		5	Jalan Parit Buaya I/S	J29 Jalan Parit Buaya – Sungai Abong, Malaysian Road Transport Department (JPJ) district branch office	Junctions
Muar		L/B	BH Petrol L/B	BH Petrol L/B –	
Muar		BR	Sungai Runtong bridge		
Muar		4	Temiang I/S	Jalan Utama 1 – Taman Temiang Utama, Jalan Kim Kee	Junctions
Muar			Sungai Terap-WCE	West Coast Expressway	Under planning
Muar		3B	Bukit Treh I/S	J24 Jalan Salleh – Bandar Maharani Bandar Diraja (Town Centre) (Royal Town); J32 Jalan Muar–Labis – Labis, Bukit Kepong, Pagoh, Bukit Pasir, Bandar Universiti Pagoh; North–South Expressway Southern Route / AH2 – Kuala Lumpur, Malacca, Johor Bahru	Junctions
Muar		3A	Jalan Bukit Treh Exit	Jalan Bukit Treh – Kampung Bukit Treh	From Malacca only
Muar		2	Jalan Ismail Desa I/S	Jalan Ismail Desa – Jalan Bakariah, Medan Ikan Bakar Sabak Awor (Sabak Awor fish grill spot)	Junctions
Muar		L/B	Caltex L/B	Caltex L/B –	
Muar		1	Bakar Batu I/S	J62 Jalan Bakar Batu – Jalan Bakariah, Medan Ikan Bakar Sabak Awor (Sabak Awor fish grill spot)	Junctions
Muar		L/B	Petronas L/B	Petronas L/B –	Malacca bound
Muar		BR	Sungai Muar bridge Muar Second Bridge; Muar River		Start/End of bridge
Muar–Tangkak district border		BR	Sungai Muar bridge Muar Second Bridge; Muar River		Length: 632 m
Tangkak		0	Sungai Muar bridge Muar Second Bridge; Muar River; Parit Bunga I/C	FT 23 Malaysia Federal Route 23 – Sungai Mati, Tangkak, Jementah, Segamat, Gunung Ledang, Bukit Gambir; North–South Expressway Southern Route / AH2 – Kuala Lumpur, Malacca, Johor Bahru; FT 5 Jalan Kesang – Tanjung Agas, Bandar Maharani Bandar Diraja (Town Centre) (Royal Town)	Half-diamond interchange with ramp to Tangkak; Start/End of bridge
Through to FT 5 Malaysia Federal Route 5 / FT 19 AMJ Highway

== See also ==
- Malaysian Federal Roads system
- Muar
