= Muar Trade Centre =

Commercial, hotel and convention centre in Muar, Malaysia

- Pusat Dagangan Muar ڤوست داڬڠن موار
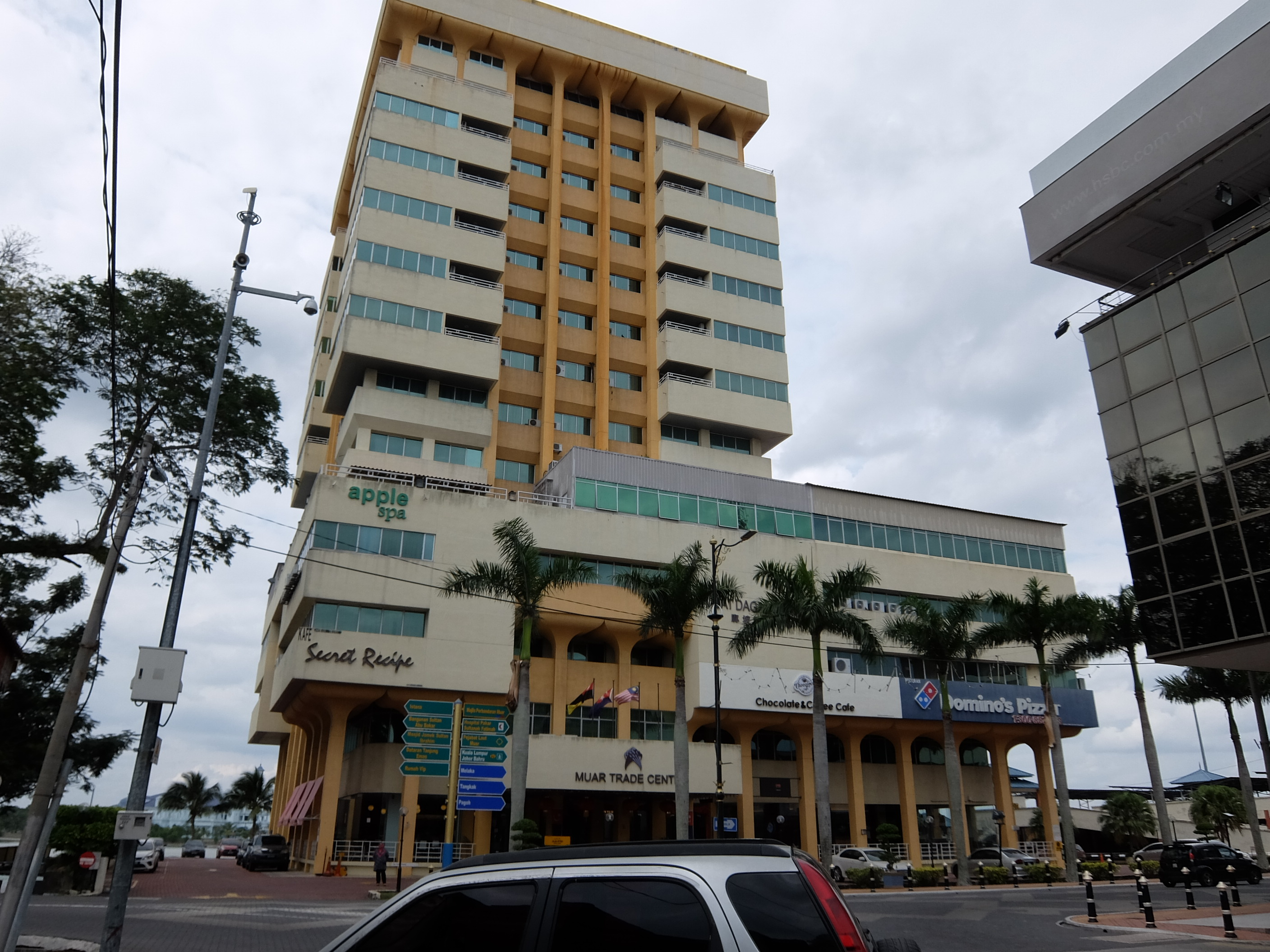
- Interactive map of the Muar Trade Centre area
- Alternative names: Muar Trader's Hotel (formerly Bangunan UMNO Muar-Pagoh)

General information
- Type: Office, Commercial and Hotel
- Location: Jalan Petrie / Jalan Maharani, Bandar Maharani, Muar, Johor, Malaysia
- Coordinates: Maharani 2.046187°N 102.563274°E
- Completed: 1984
- Opening: 1984
- Owner: Dato' K.C. Lim
- Operator: Actitage Sdn Bhd

Technical details
- Floor count: 11

Website
- www.muartradershotel.com.my

Muar Trade Centre (Malay: Pusat Dagangan Muar; Jawi: ڤوست داڬڠن موار) (formerly Bangunan UMNO Muar-Pagoh) (Note: Antara bangunan yang mengambil bahagian ialah Bangunan UMNO Muar-Pagoh.) (Note: Acara lawatan dimulakan dengan Majlis Dialog Bersama Rakyat di Muar Traders Hotel (dahulunya Bangunan UMNO Muar-Pagoh).) is a major landmark in Bandar Maharani, Muar, Johor, Malaysia. As one of the highest building in the town that houses a hotel and several commercial facilities.

== History ==
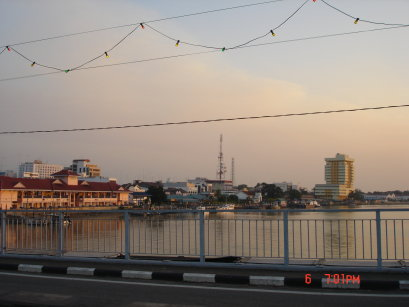
Muar Trade Centre building (far right) at Muar River bank from Sultan Ismail Bridge.

The building was actually planned and built by the United Malays National Organisation (UMNO) Muar Division when former Menteri Besar of Johor Tan Sri Othman Saat was the division's chief and was initially to be named as Muar UMNO Building. It was constructed on the state government granted land plot strategically located at the street intersection of Jalan Othman with Jalan Petrie and Jalan Maharani beside the scenic Muar River. The building construction was finished and was opened in the 1984 coinciding with the town centennial celebration by the subsequent Menteri Besar Tan Sri Muhyiddin Yassin. But by then the party division was already split technically into two, the actual Muar and the newly Muhyiddin-led Pagoh divisions in correspond to the new border redelineation process by the Election Commission (EC) which had created the new Pagoh parliamentary constituency out of the original Muar parliamentary constituency, the building was finally named as Muar-Pagoh UMNO Building to indicate the inclusiveness of the contribution and ownership of both party divisions in the building.

In the beginning when the highest building in Muar being opened then, it was quite an attraction and excitement for the peoples of Muar town. The Muar-Pagoh UMNO Building housed the UMNO office, Bank Bumiputera branch, Park View Hotel, some commercial shops, a video game arcade, a snooker center, a nightly performing live band terrace bar and a bowling alley at time of opening. However gradually the building became inactive over the years and was dormant for years after facing weak management problem and financial trouble for loan debt repayment before it was eventually repossessed from UMNO and auctioned of by the creditor bank.

== Acquisitions and rebranding developments ==
In 2006, the building was at last acquired and taken over by a local private company which renamed it "Muar Trade Centre". The building is being operated and managed by Actitage Sdn Bhd, currently houses commercial lots, a new hotel, and Muar Trader's Hotel that includes a convention centre.

== See also ==
- List of shopping malls in Malaysia
