= Johor State Route J24 =

Road in Malaysia

Johor Route 24
- Jalan Salleh

Major junctions
- West end: Muar (Bandar Maharani); Bentayan
- FT 5 Federal Route 5 FT 24 Federal Route 24; FT 224 Muar Bypass; J32 State Route J32
- East end: Bukit Treh-Muar Bypass

Location
- Country: Malaysia
- Primary destinations: Parit Setongkat; Taipan Muar

Highway system
- Highways in Malaysia; Expressways; Federal; State

Jalan Salleh, Johor State Route J24 (Jawi: جالن صالح) is a major road in Johor, Malaysia.

The Kilometre Zero of Jalan Salleh starts at Bandar Maharani, Muar, at its interchange with the Federal Route 5, the main trunk road of the west coast of Peninsular Malaysia.

The Jalan Salleh formerly was part of State Route J32. Some of the maps still labelled J24 Jalan Salleh as J32 since the Jalan Salleh is connected to Jalan Muar–Labis.

== History ==
The entire route of Jalan Salleh was originally a two-way route. To solve the traffic congestion at Sultan Ismail Bridge due to the increased traffic flow, the Bentayan Junctions–Jalan Hashim has become a one-way road to Labis. At the same time the Malaysia Federal Route 5 was changed to one way direction to Malacca for Jalan Abdullah junctions to Sultan Ismail Bridge junctions.

== Features ==
=== Overlap ===
Route number	Route name	Section	Notes
FT 5	Malaysia Federal Route 5	Bentayan Junctions–Jalan Hashim	From Malacca only

At most sections, State Route J24 was built under the JKR R5 road standard, allowing maximum speed limit of up to 90 km/h.

== Junction lists ==
The entire route is located in Muar District, Johor.

Legend:

- I/C - Interchange, I/S - Intersection, RSA - Rest and service area, OBR - Overhead bridge restaurant, R/R - Restaurant and rest plaza, L/B - Layby, V/P - Vista point, TN - tunnel, T/P - Toll plaza, BR - Bridge
- C - Cloverleaf, S - Stack, T-A - Trumpet-A, T-B - Trumpet-B, DT - Directional-T/Y, SDT - Semi-Directional-T/Y, P-Y - Partial-Y, D - Diamond, P-C - Partial cloverleaf, D-D - Diverging diamond, D-R - Direct ramp

Location	km	mi	Name	Destinations	Notes
Muar	0.0	0.0	Muar; Bentayan	FT 5 Malaysia Federal Route 5 – Malacca (Through Sultan Ismail Bridge), Bakri, Parit Sulong, Yong Peng (Through Jalan Hashim); Jalan Abdullah – Tanjung Emas, Memorial Tun Dr Ismail, Bangunan Sultan Abu Bakar, Istana Tanjung, Masjid Jamek Sultan Ibrahim; North–South Expressway Southern Route / AH2 – Kuala Lumpur, Seremban	One way Junctions
Muar			Muar; Muar Prison		
Muar			Muar; Sultanah Fatimah Specialist Hospital	Sultanah Fatimah Specialist Hospital	
Muar			Sungai Abong bridge		
Muar			Muar; Jalan Sungai Abong	Jalan Sungai Abong – Sungai Abong	T-junctions
Muar			Muar; Jalan Ismail-Jalan Bakariah	J20 Jalan Ismail – Medan Ikan Bakar Sabak Awor (Sabak Awor fish grill spot); J64 Jalan Bakariah – Kampung Bukit Treh	Junctions
Muar			Parit Setongkat		
Muar			Tapian Muar		
Muar			Jalan Kim Kee	Jalan Kim Kee	T-junctions
Muar			Bandar Maharani Gateway Arch		
Muar			Bukit Treh-Muar Bypass	FT 224 Muar Bypass – Malacca, Tangkak, Segamat, Parit Sulong, Yong Peng, Batu Pahat, Medan Ikan Bakar Sabak Awor (Sabak Awor fish grill spot); North–South Expressway Southern Route / AH2 – Kuala Lumpur, Johor Bahru	Interchange
Muar			Through to J32 Johor State Route J32		
1.000 mi = 1.609 km; 1.000 km = 0.621 mi: Incomplete access; Route transition
