= Betta balunga =

Conservation status
- Data Deficient (IUCN 3.1)

Scientific classification
- Kingdom: Animalia
- Phylum: Chordata
- Class: Actinopterygii
- Order: Anabantiformes
- Family: Osphronemidae
- Genus: Betta
- Species: B. balunga

Binomial name
- Betta balunga Herre, 1940

Species of fish

Betta balunga is a species of gourami endemic to the island of Borneo, and whose species name derives from the location where it was first described - the Balung River in Sabah, eastern Malaysia. It inhabits forest and blackwater streams, and grows to a length of 4.9 cm (1.9 in).

== Habitat and distribution ==
The type locality of Betta balunga corresponds to a locality in Tawau Division, Sabah State, Malaysian Borneo. Its distribution is currently considered to extend southwards from Tawau as far as the Sebuku and Mahakam watersheds in Kalimantan Timur (East Kalimantan) province in Indonesia. In Sebuku it has been collected alongside B. albimarginata from a flowing forest streams in very shallow (depth 5-10 cm) water among marginal plants roots and leaf litter. In the Mahakam basin it typically inhabits sluggish, black water streams among submerged marginal vegetation and leaf litter. Specimens from the Mahakam differ from Tawau fish in some meristic counts but Tan and Ng (2005) considered them conspecific with B. balunga due to a lack of comparative material from the type locality.

== Sexual dimorphism ==
Males have brighter colors, more iridescent scales on the head area, a broader head shape, and more extended fins than females.

== Diet ==
=== In the wild ===
In the wild, Betta balunga has a diet that consists of insects such as Drosophila spp., zooplankton, and other small, aquatic invertebrates.

=== In the aquarium ===
The captive fish will normally accept dried products once they're recognised as edible, but should be offered plenty of small live or frozen foods such as Daphnia, Artemia or bloodworm regularly to ensure development of optimal colour and condition.

== Reproduction and development ==
Betta balunga is a paternal mouthbrooder, which means that the fry are incubated in the male's mouth. The female plays the more active role in initiating courtship and defending the area against intruders. After courting, eggs and milt are released during an "embrace" typical of gouramis in which the male wraps his body around that of the female, and several "practice" embraces may be required beforehand. Once spawning begins, eggs are laid in small batches and picked up in the mouth of the female before being spat out into the water for the male to catch. Once the male has all the eggs in his mouth the cycle is repeated until the female is spent of eggs, a process which can take some time. The incubation period is 14 – 21 days at which point the male will begin to release fully-formed, free-swimming fry. The male might swallow or prematurely release the fry when stressed. The fry are large enough to eat motile foods such as microworm and Artemia nauplii immediately.
