= Ceracap Inai (dance) =

Malay traditional dance

Ceracap Inai dance
- Native name: Tarian Ceracap Inai
- Origin: Malaysia

Ceracap Inai is a type of traditional Malay folk dance that is especially popular in Johor.

== History ==
Ceracap Inai is associated with the history of the Malacca Sultanate, when Sultan Mahmud Shah retreated to Sungai Muar.

This dance is said to originate from the palace dance and is danced in front of the Sultan and state dignitaries. Therefore, the Ceracap Inai dance has elements of 'worship duli' (worship / forgiveness) and humility, and is also danced usually in front of the 'King of the Day' / Bride.

Ceracap Inai is performed with decorations such as 'Golden Flowers' and lit candles that symbolize rays of happiness and well-being. This dance was originally danced by an odd number of dancers or danced in pairs by male and female dancers and can also be danced by female dancers only. The number of dancers usually consists of 5–8 people. This dance is very famous in Kampung Baru Lenga, Batu 28, Lenga in Muar District, Johor.
