= Muar Second Bridge =

Sungai Muar Bridge Jambatan Kedua Muar
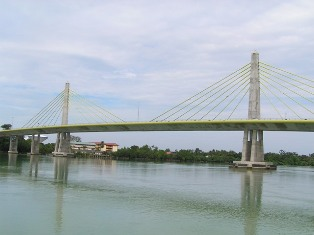
- Coordinates: 2°4′36″N 102°33′15″E
- Carries: Motor vehicles, Pedestrians
- Crosses: Muar River
- Locale: Federal Route 224 Muar Bypass, Muar
- Official name: Muar Second Bridge
- Maintained by: Malaysian Public Works Department (JKR) Muar and Tangkak; Selia Selenggara Sdn Bhd

Characteristics
- Design: cable-stayed bridge
- Total length: 632 m
- Width: --
- Longest span: 132 m

History
- Designer: Government of Malaysia; Malaysian Public Works Department (JKR); Ranhill Bersekutu Sdn Bhd
- Constructed by: Ranhill Bersekutu Sdn Bhd
- Opened: 2003

Muar Second Bridge (Malay: Jambatan Kedua Muar) is a cable-stayed bridge in Muar, Johor, Malaysia. It crosses the Muar River, linking the eastern outskirts of Muar with Parit Bunga on the Tangkak side of the river.

== History ==
Between the 1990s to 2000s, traffic congestion was prevalent at the Sultan Ismail Bridge since the official opening of the North–South Expressway Southern Route between Ayer Keroh and Pagoh and the opening of the Tangkak and Pagoh Interchange on April 1, 1989. In 1998, the federal government announced that a second bridge would be built at Parit Bunga to ease traffic congestion on the existing bridge.

The bridge was constructed between March 2001 and June 2003. It was built by Public Works Department of Malaysia (JKR) while the main contractor was Ranhill Bersekutu Sdn Bhd. The bridge was officially opened to traffic on 2004 alongside the opening of the Muar Bypass.

== Bridge Descriptions ==
The Muar Second Bridge is a 632-metre semi-harp cable-stayed bridge with a 132-metre mid-span across Muar River, similar in design to the Sunshine Skyway Bridge in Tampa Bay, Florida, in the United States, and Prai River Bridge in Penang, Malaysia. The bridge project also features a complex interchange at Parit Bunga, the first in the town.

== See also ==
- Muar
- Sungai Muar
- Muar Bypass
- Jambatan Sultan Ismail
