= Laluan Penarikan =

Portage routes across Malay Peninsula

Coordinates: 2°47′59.1″N 102°22′23.0″E

The Laluan Penarikan (Malay: portage route) were a series of portage routes across the Malay Peninsula. The most famous of these routes connected the Muar River with the Pahang River. The Penarikan shortened the journey of water vessels sailing between the Strait of Malacca and the South China Sea.

== History ==
In ancient times, the Muar and Pahang rivers were nearly connected at a place called Jempol specifically at the town of Bahau, in present-day Negeri Sembilan, where the Muar meets the Jempol River. The Serting River, not far from the confluence of the former two, flows into the Bera River, a tributary of the Pahang. The Penarikan allowed trading boats between ports and harbours from both sides of the Malay Peninsula, such as traders from Malacca or Muar who could continue their journey along the Muar until they reached Kuala Pahang in Pekan, or Kuala Lipis to continue into Terengganu, Kelantan or Perak.

At the Penarikan, locals help was required to pull the boats about 300 metres overland.

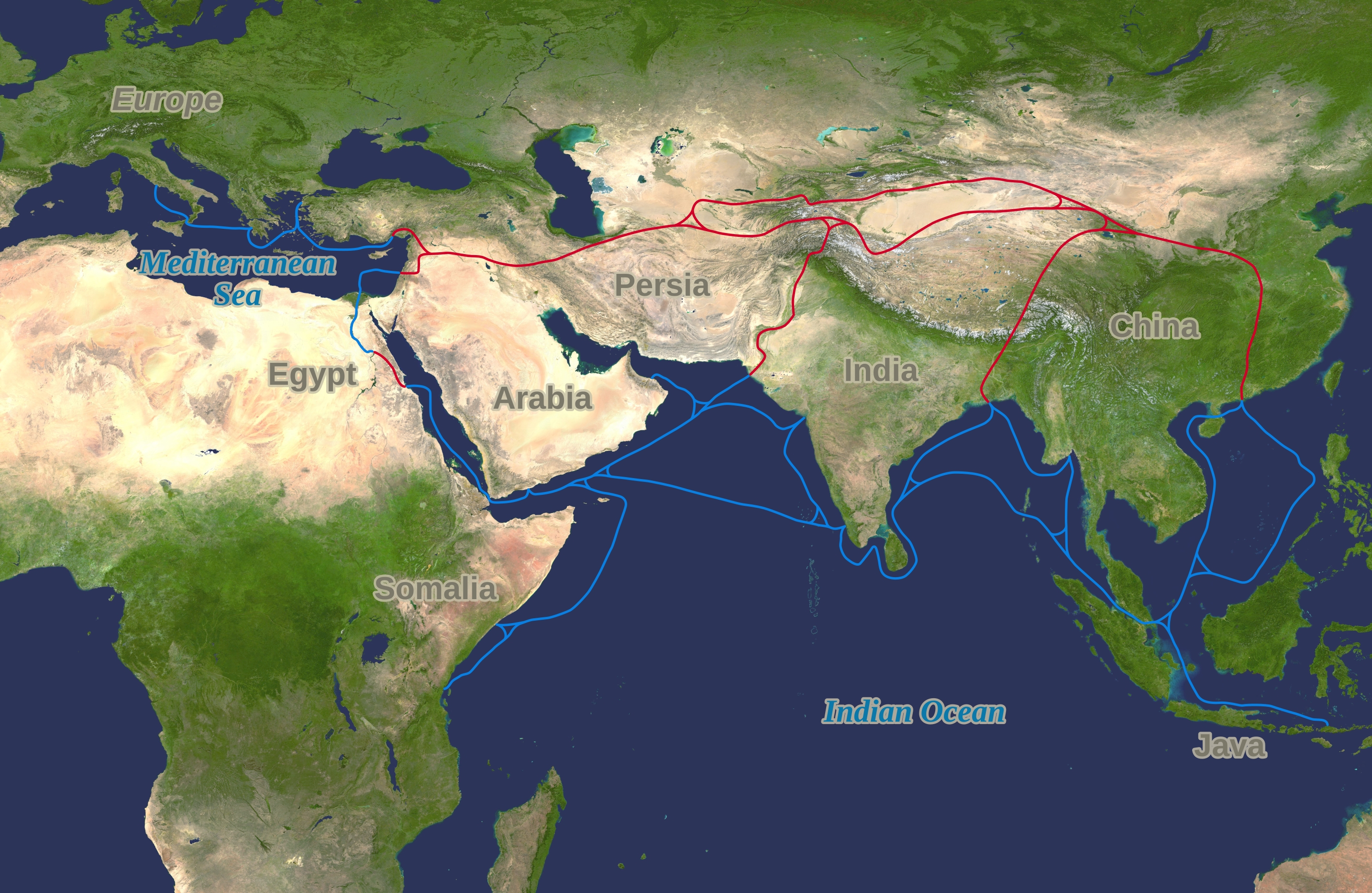
The economically important Silk Road (red) and spice trade routes (blue) were blocked by the Seljuk Empire c. 1090, triggering the Crusades, and by the Ottoman Empire c. 1453, which spurred the Age of Discovery and European Colonialism.

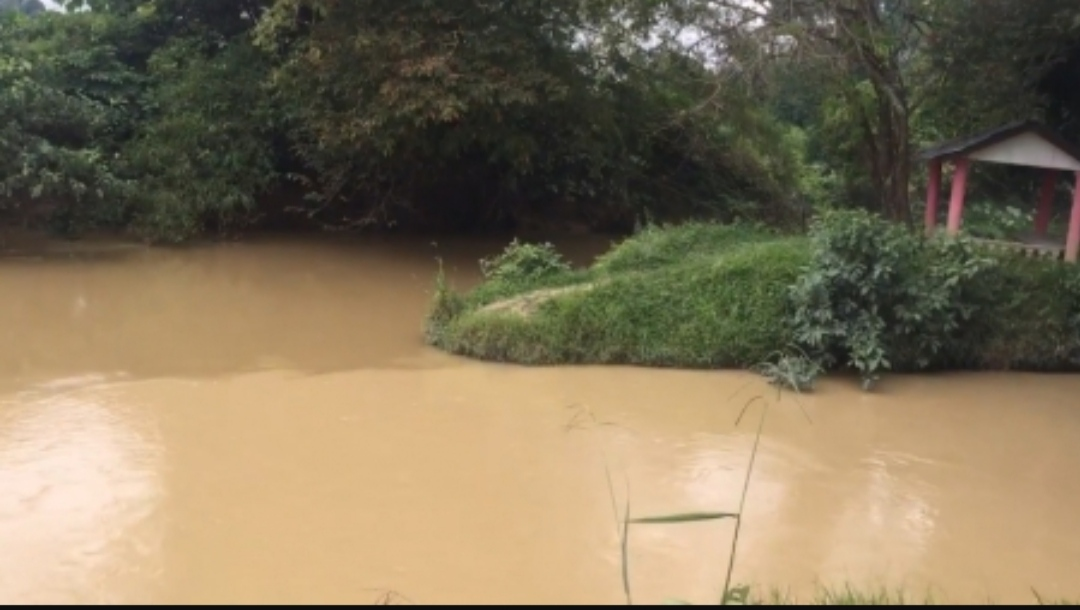
The confluence between the Muar (left) and Jempol Rivers at Kampung Jambu Lapan, Bahau, Jempol District, Negeri Sembilan, is the midpoint of the Penarikan.

The Penarikan may have been discovered c. 14th century. Arab merchants were actively trading as well as spreading Islam. When Malacca was discovered, they came to Malacca for trade and at the same time; the Pasai came to Malacca too to acquire their daily sundries. The Arabs learned of the Laluan Penarikan from the Pasai.

The Penarikan played a vital role in the military operations between Siam and Malacca. Using this route, the Siamese launched many attacks against Malacca. A troop was sent to make an ambush. Half of the troop stayed near the Penarikan as backup and the other half attacked Malacca. However, the backup group has another mission, they had to dig a big canal measuring 30 feet by 20 feet in depth, so they could connect the Jempol and Serting Rivers.

A leader of the Siamese army was later buried near the Penarikan. The tombstone was believed to have been transported all the way from Siam. The Siamese leader's grave could still be found near the route, which dates back to 1265.

The Penarikan has also witnessed many significant events in history. The famous Malaccan warrior Hang Tuah, while on the run with Tun Teja, used the Penarikan to flee to Pahang. The last Sultan of Malacca, Mahmud Shah, after the conquest of Malacca by the Portuguese Empire had also used the Penarikan to escape to Pahang.

In 1613, a Portuguese officer wrote that he took a boat ride from Muar to Pekan, and the journey took him six days. A map produced in 1598 showed that the Muar River and the Pahang River is connected at a place which is now called Serting in Negeri Sembilan.

The Muar River–Pahang River Penarikan route is a safer route to the South China Sea or to the Strait of Malacca, because there were no disturbances and threats of piracy.

Apart from that there were also signs of trading activities, whereby goods changed hands at this point. That meant that boats from Pahang with produce stopped here, transacted and picked up goods that were eastward bound and returned to Pahang. Similarly, boats from Muar, bringing goods from Malacca and Singapore were brought to the Penarikan, where barter occurred.

== See also ==
- Spice trade
- Silk Road

Successor cross-peninsular routes nearby

- Malaysia Federal Route 9 - Karak to Malacca town
- Malaysia Federal Route 10 - Temerloh to Gemas
- Malaysia Federal Route 12 - Segamat to Gambang
- KTM Intercity from Gemas to Mentakab
