= Bukit Naning =

Coordinates: 2°02′N 102°46′E

- Suburb of Muar
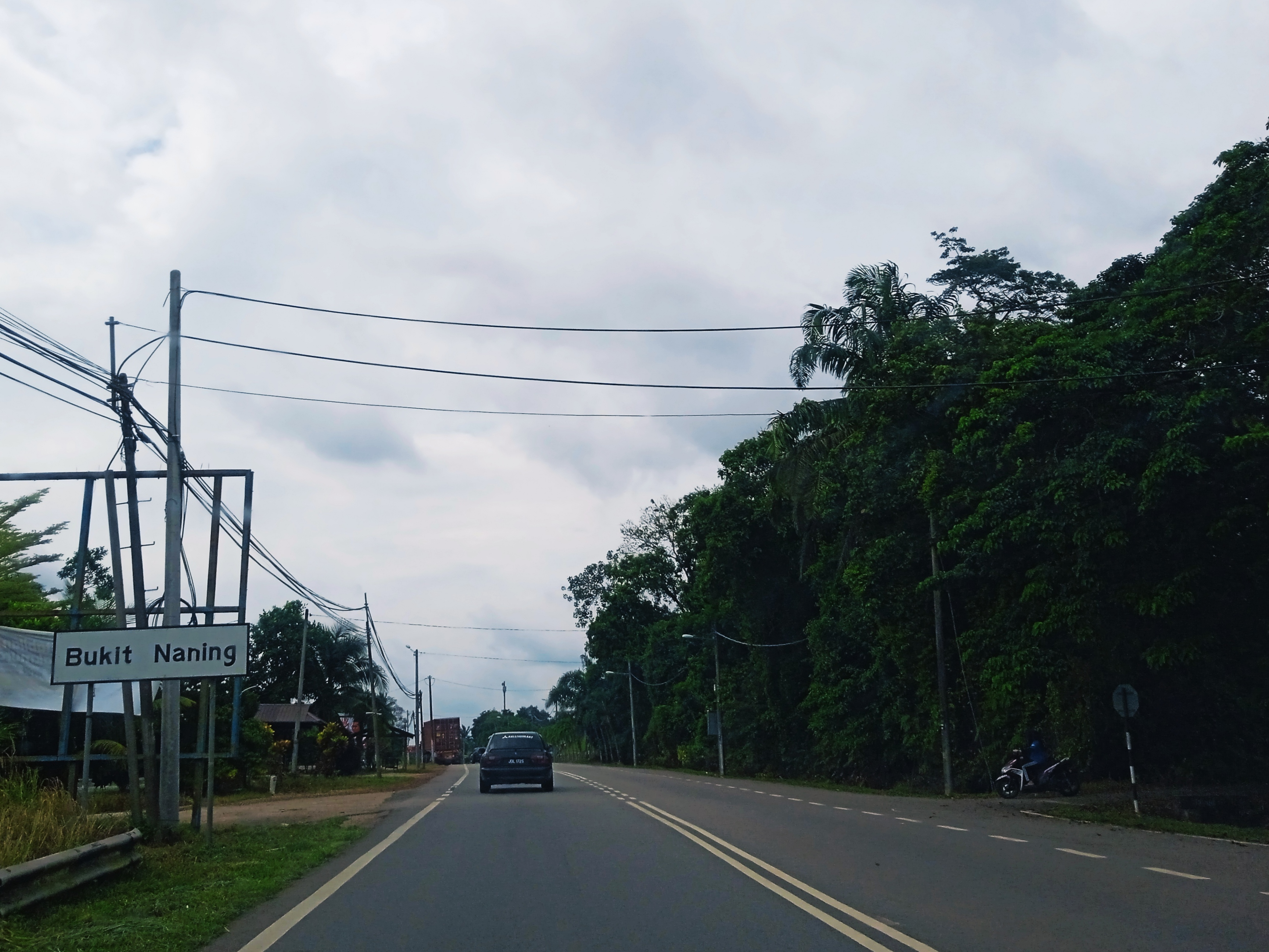
- Road sign of Bukit Naning on the left side of Jalan Muar-Yong Peng Road.
- Interactive map of Bukit Naning
- Country: Malaysia
- State: Johor
- District: Muar District

Area
  - Total: 118 km^{2} (46 sq mi)

Population (2010)
  - Total: 7,695
  - Density: 65.2/km^{2} (169/sq mi)

Bukit Naning is a suburb of Muar Town and a Muar District, Johor, Malaysia. It is situated in the parliamentary constituency of Bakri. The suburb spans over an area of 118 square km, with a population estimated at 7,695.

== Infrastructure ==
- Jamek Al-Karomah Mosque

== Gallery ==
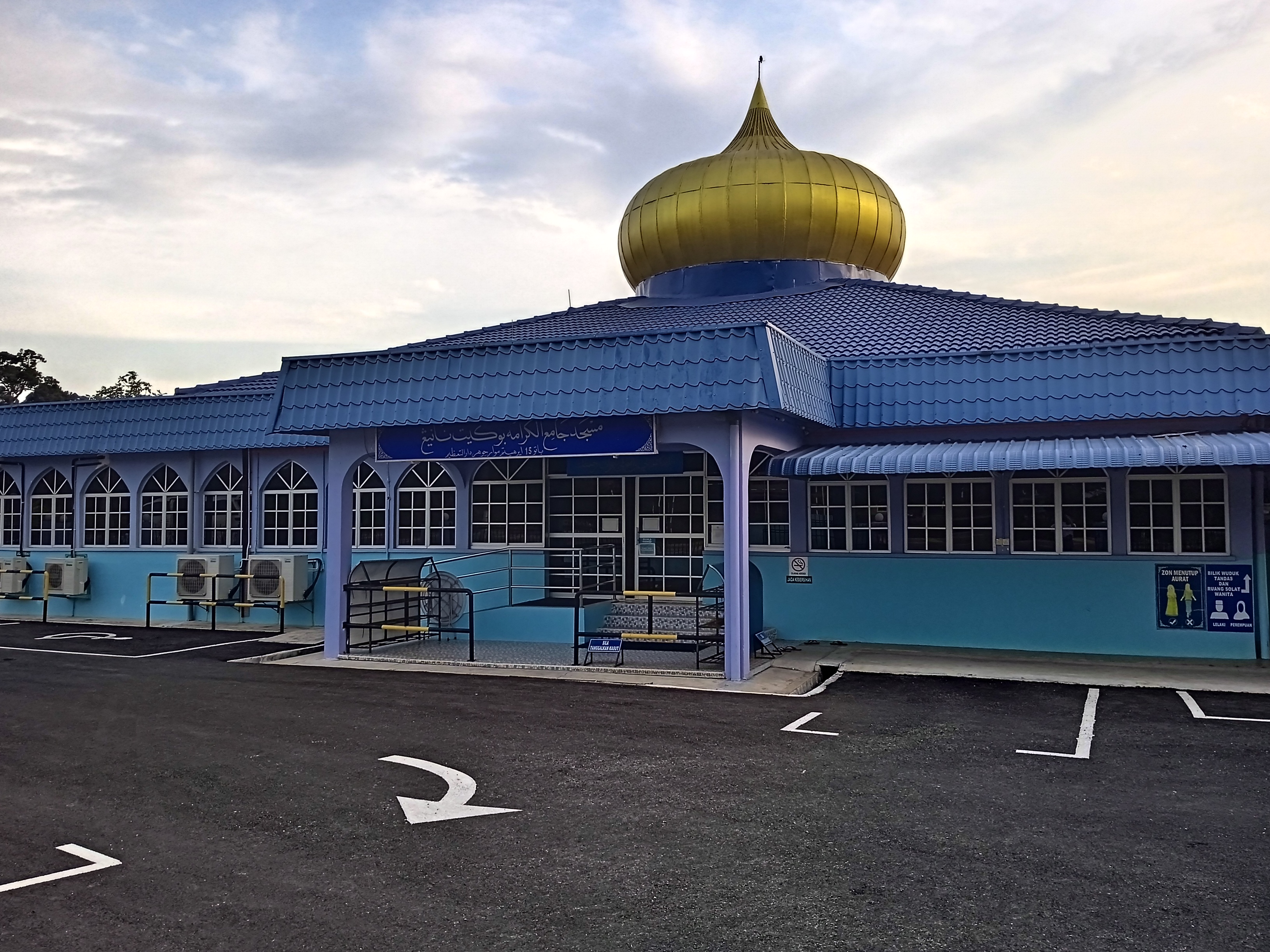
Masjid Jamek Al-Karomah, 2023.

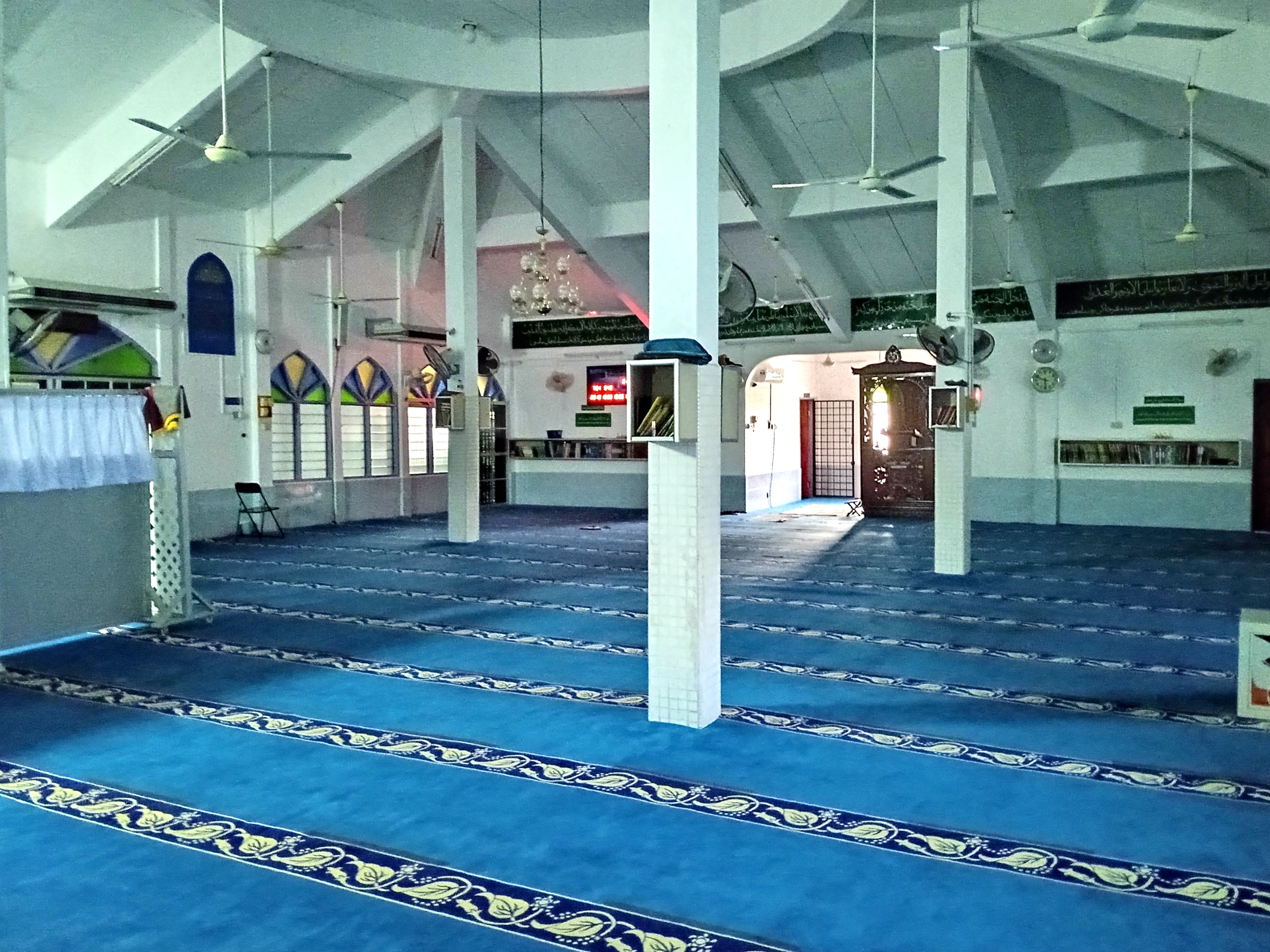
Masjid Jamek Al-Karomah (interior), 2023.

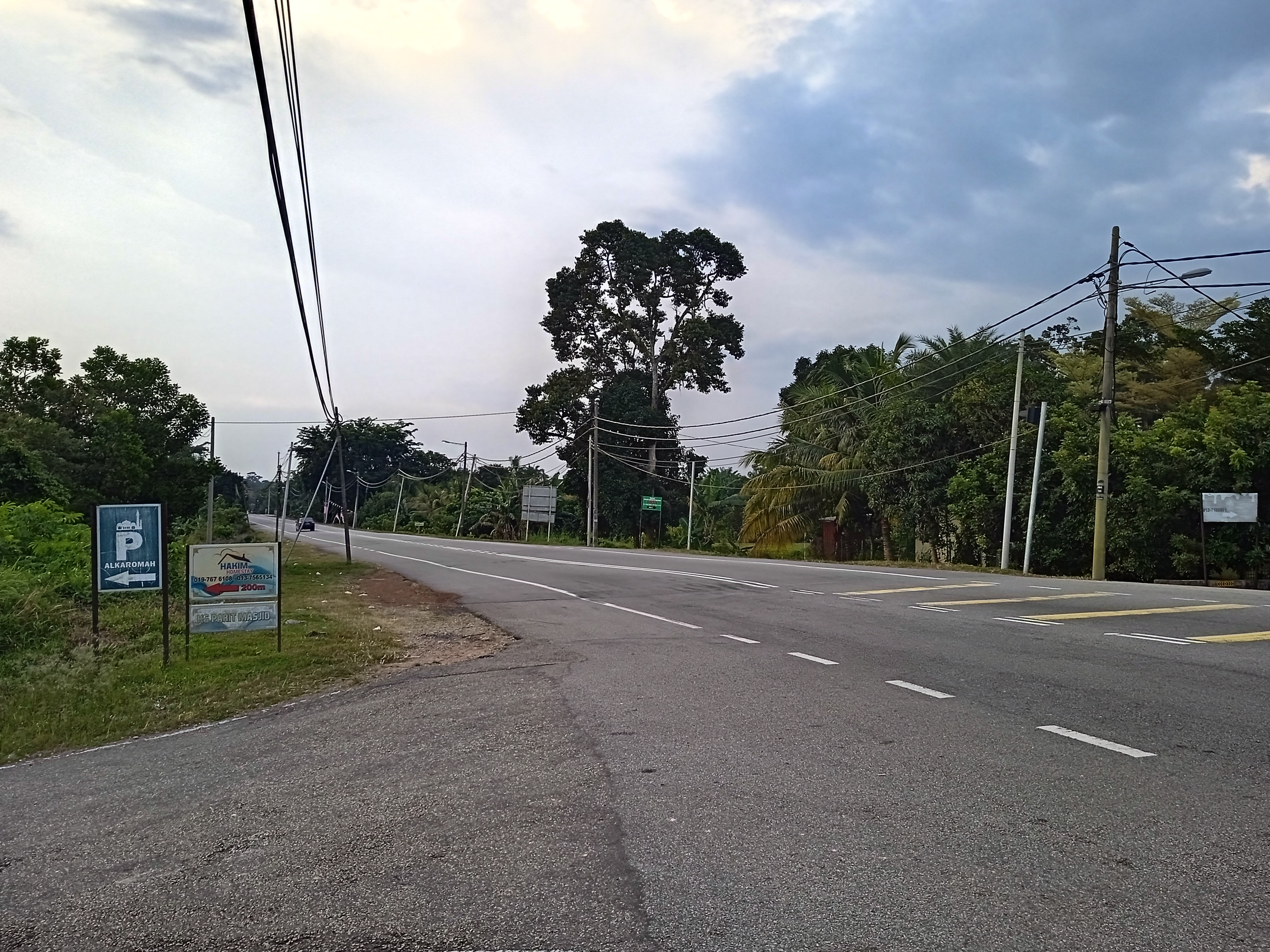
Jalan Muar-Yong Peng, Bukit Naning, 2023.
