= Sungai Abong =

- Suburb

Other transcription(s)
  - Jawi: سوغاي ابوغ
  - Chinese: 新加旺
- Location within Johor Location within Peninsular Malaysia Location within Malaysia
- Coordinates: 2°03′37″N 102°35′47″E
- Country: Malaysia
- State: Johor
- District: Muar
- Time zone: UTC+8 (MYT)
- Postal code: 84000

Sungai Abong (Jawi: سوغاي ابوغ; Chinese: 新加旺) is a main suburb in Muar District, Johor, Malaysia. It was a constituency of Johor State Legislative Assembly situated in the parliamentary constituency of Bakri. But it was renamed Simpang Jeram since the 2018 general election.

== Schools ==
- SJK(C) Soon Cheng

== Gallery ==
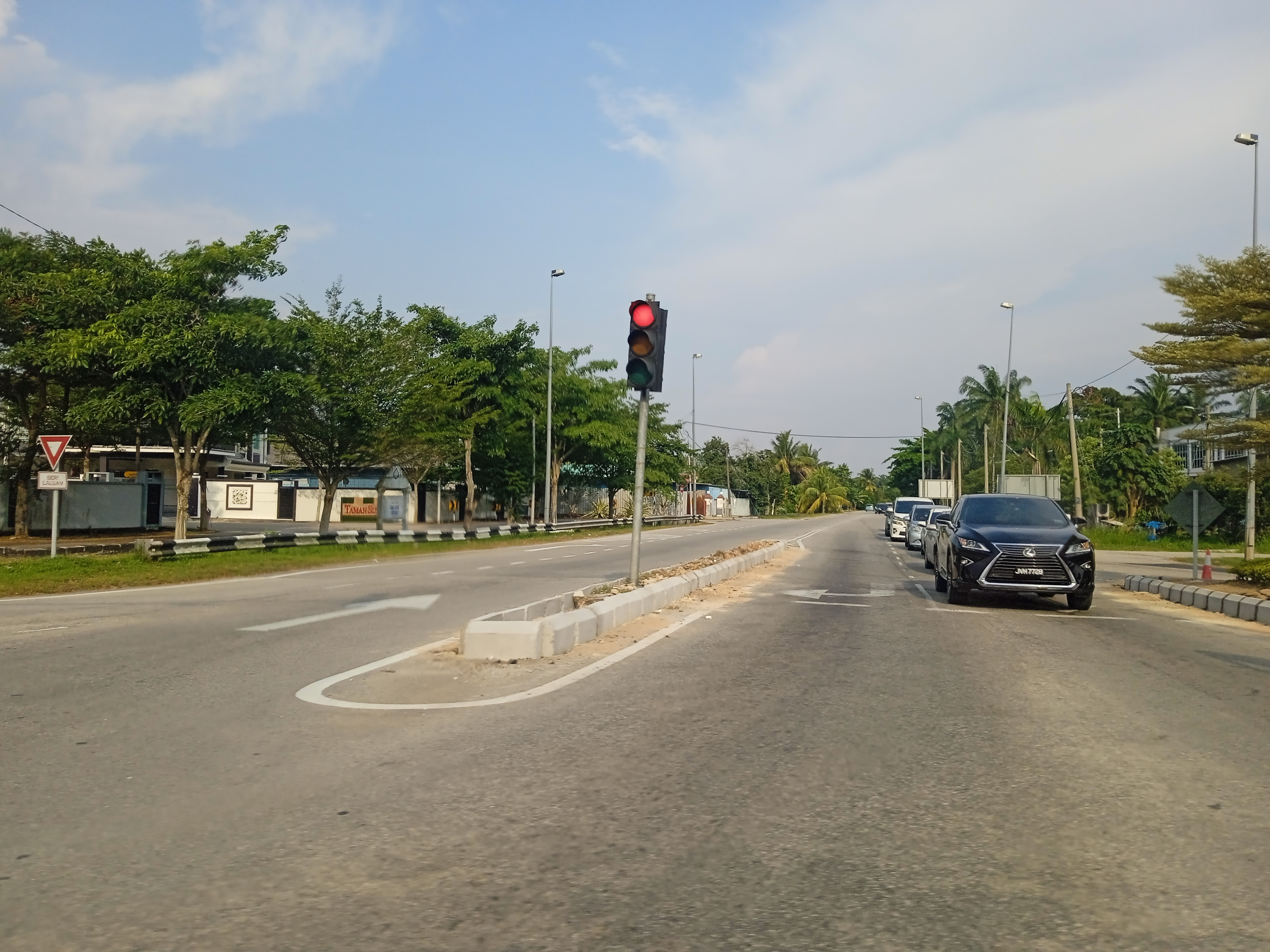
Kampung Sungai Abong, 2023.

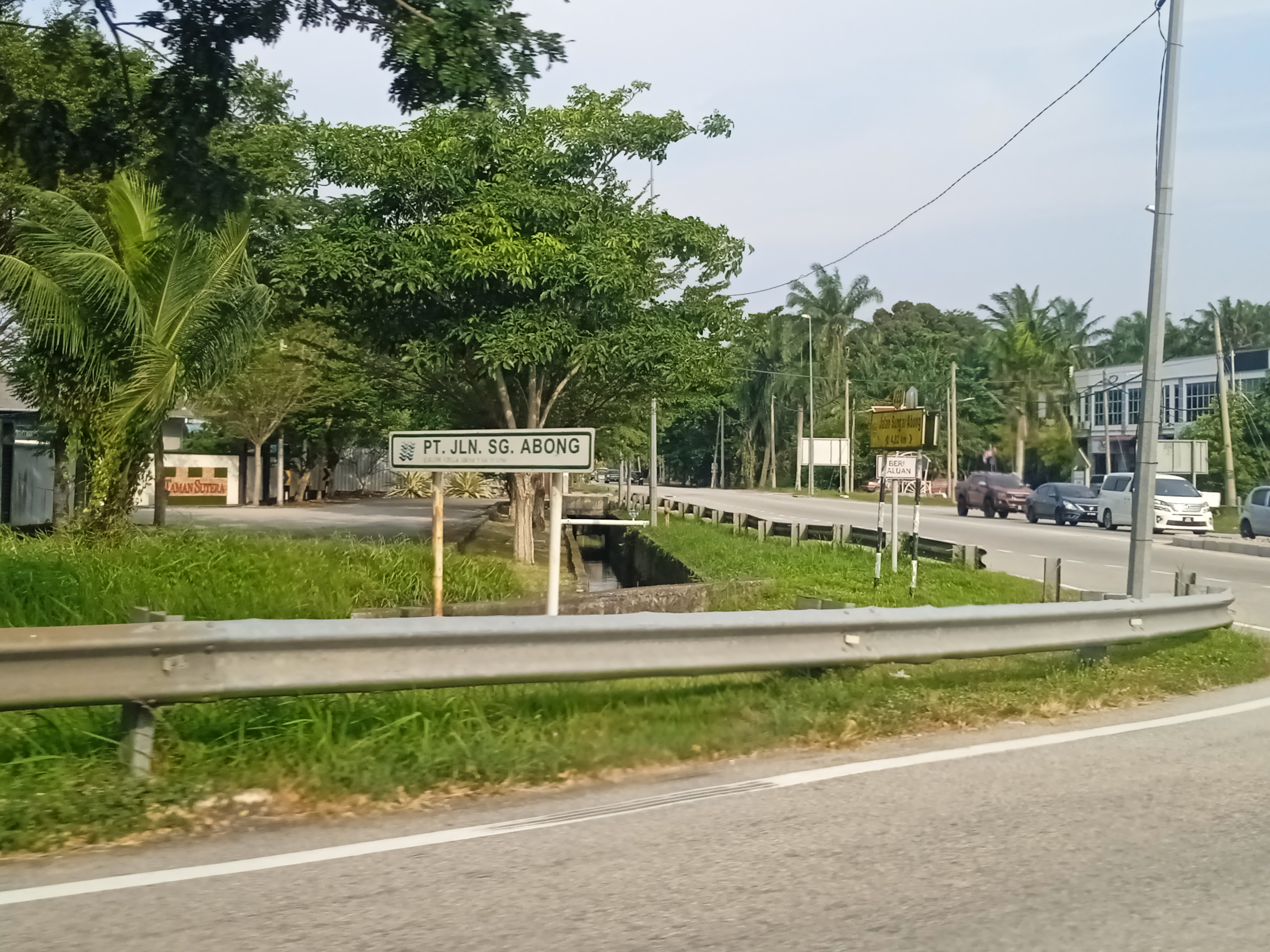
Parit Jalan Sungai Abong, 2023.

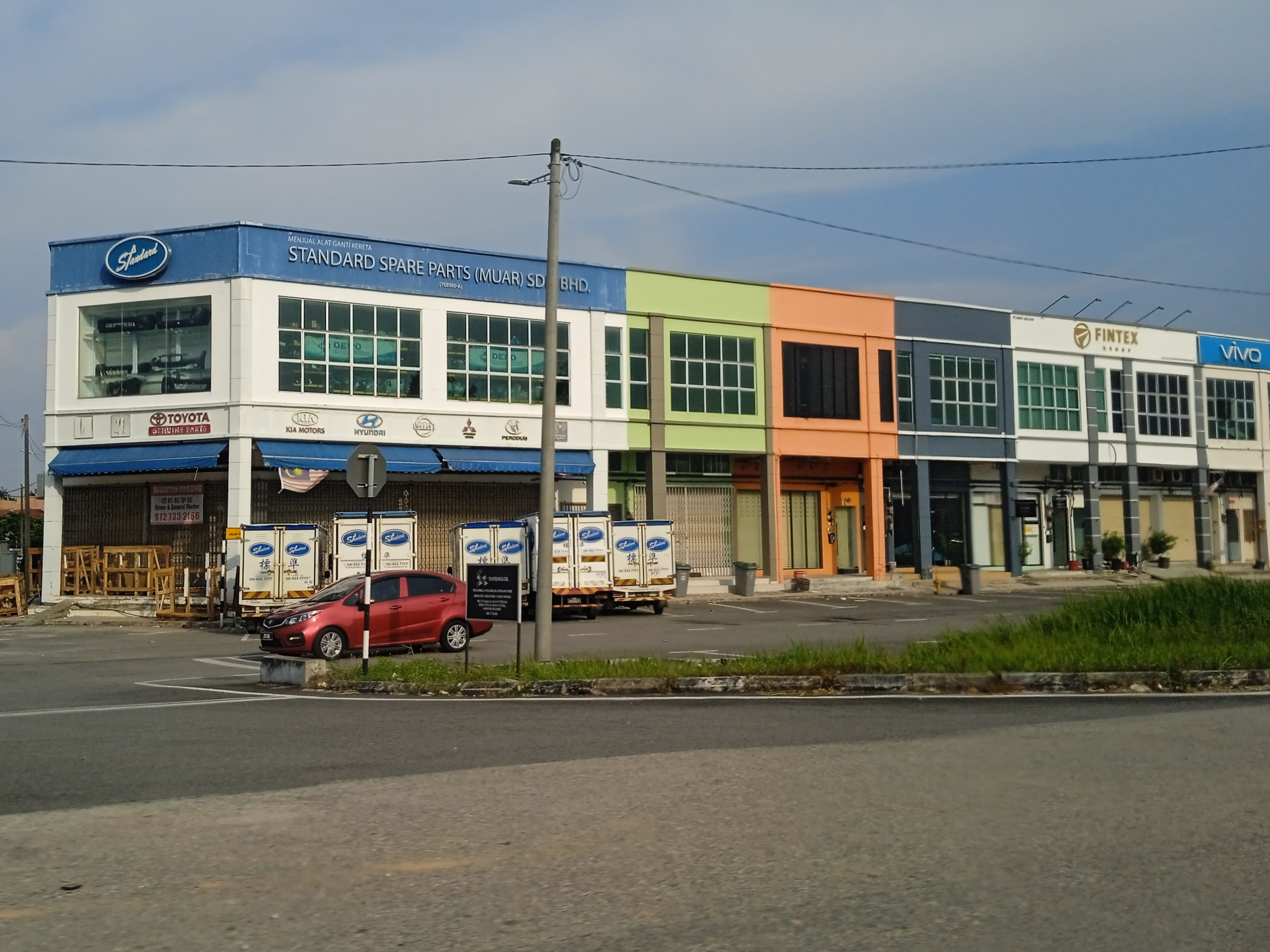
Taman Sungai Abong Sutera, 2023.
