= Parit Sakai =

- Town in Malaysia
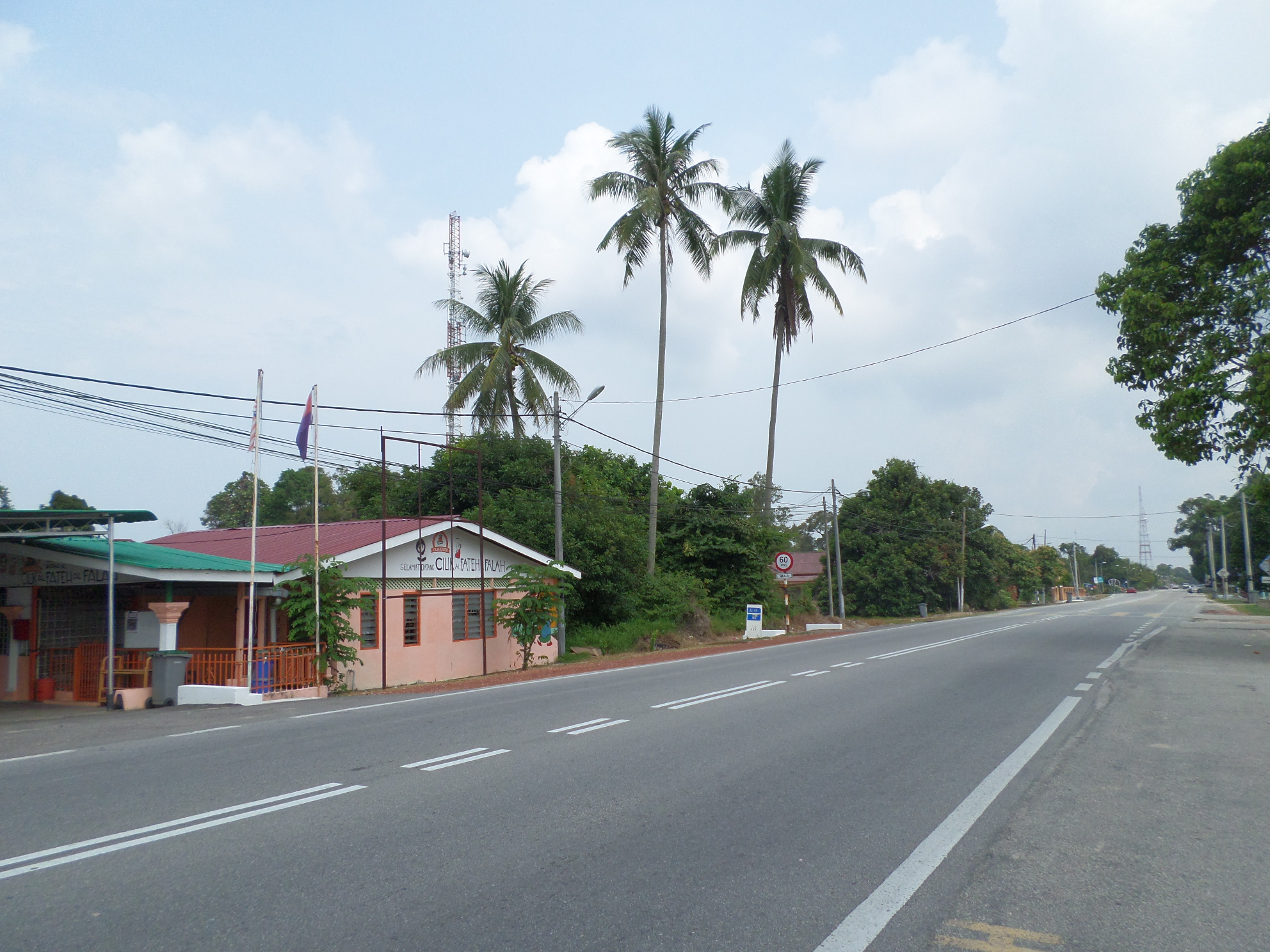
- Parit Sakai

- Parit Sakai in Johor, Malay Peninsular and Malaysia Parit Sakai (Peninsular Malaysia) Parit Sakai (Malaysia)
- Coordinates: 2°01′18.1″N 102°34′44.1″E
- Country: Malaysia
- State: Johor
- District: Muar
- Elevation: 8 m (26 ft)
- Time zone: UTC+8 (MYT)
- Postal code: 84000

Parit Sakai is a small village in Muar District, Johor, Malaysia. This village is located about 5 km from Muar town. The famous Makam Panglima Lidah Hitam, a legendary silat master is located here.
