= Muara Kemumu =

Muara Kemumu is a district (kecamatan) of Kepahiang Regency, Bengkulu, Indonesia.

== History ==
Muara Kenumu was established on 16 November 2005, after being split off from the eastern part of Kepahiang district.

== Subdistricts ==
- Air Pungur
- Batu Bandung
- Batu Kalung
- Damar Kencana
- Limbur Baru
- Pematang Danau Air Les
- Renah Kurung
- Sosokan Baru
- Sosokan Taba
- Talang Tige
- Warung Pojok
