= Sungai Balang =

Mukim in Muar District, Johor, Malaysia

- Suburb

Other transcription(s)
  - Jawi: سوڠاي بالڠ
  - Chinese: 双溪峇廊
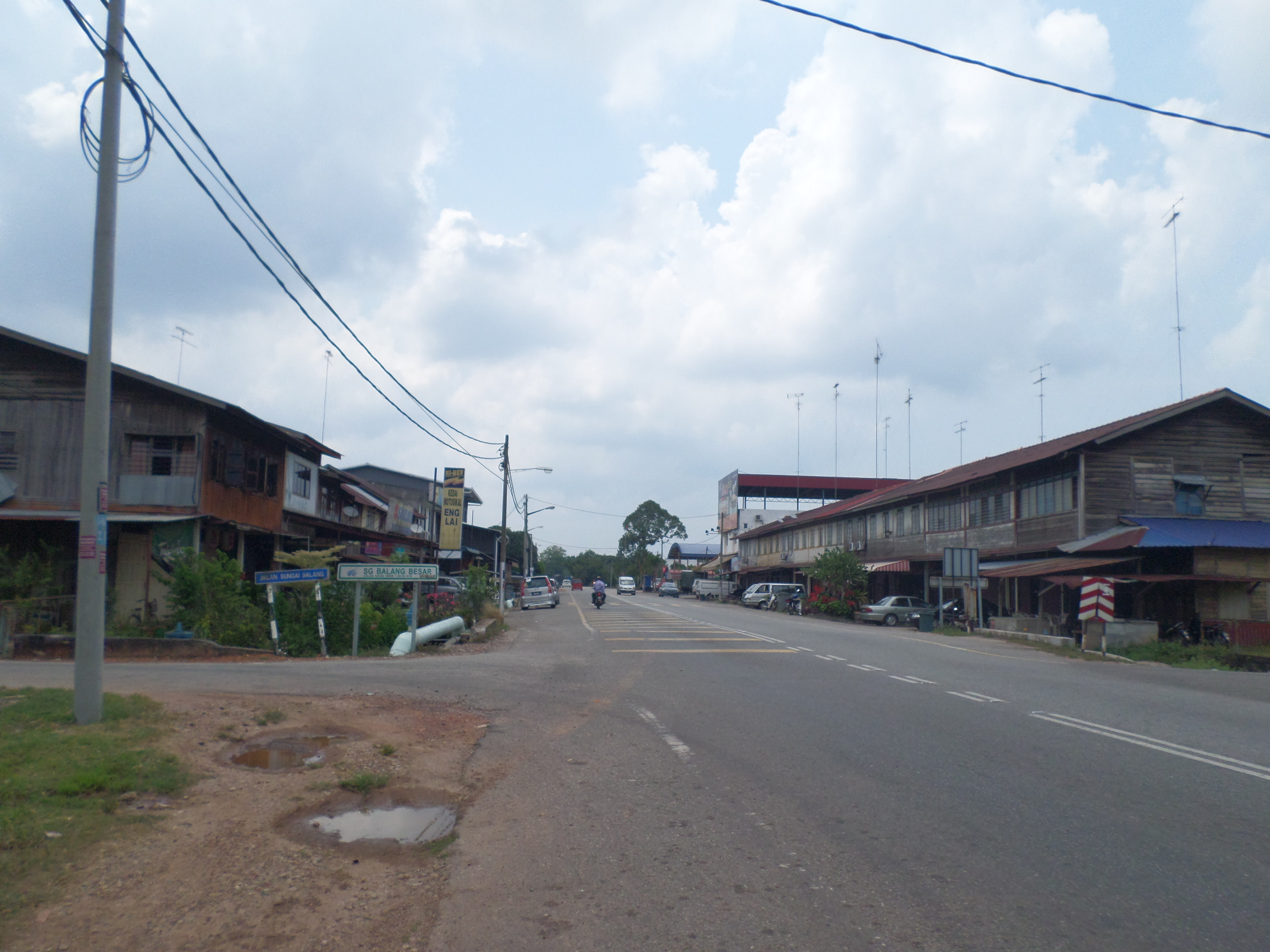
- Sungai Balang

- Sungai Balang location in Johor, Malay Peninsular and Malaysia Sungai Balang (Peninsular Malaysia) Sungai Balang (Malaysia)
- Coordinates: 1°54′N 102°44′E
- Country: Malaysia
- State: Johor
- District: Muar
- Time zone: UTC+8 (MYT)
- Postal code: 83600

Sungai Balang in Muar District

Sungai Balang (Jawi: سوڠاي بالڠ; Chinese: 双溪峇廊) is a mukim in Muar District, Johor, Malaysia. It is located on Federal Route 5. Its name literally means Balang River.

Sungai Balang also noted as a sanctuary of migratory birds stopover along its coast beside Parit Jawa.

== History ==
The history of the town begins in 1886 when Ali bin Said, an Islamic scholar from Parit Sakai, was appointed Orang Kaya (noble lord) officer by Sultan Abu Bakar of Johor. Ali was sent by his father, Orang Kaya Said, the first Muar District headman (penghulu) appointed by Temenggong Ibrahim, to Mecca upon the completion of his religious study in Malacca at the age of 15. At that time, the resident of "Padang" area which also included the area of Parit Sakai up to Parit Samsu; with its administration centre in Parit Bakar, is said to have a common ('wakaf') house in Mecca in the "Village of Shuib Ali" in the 19th century. The house was to put the children of officers and dignitaries of Padang acquiring religious knowledge and studies upon the end of their study in Malacca. It was the wish of many peoples in Padang to send their children to further their study of religion in Mecca or Egypt so that they can become pious and religious scholars. Some parents even accompanied their sons during their studies and stay until they died in the Holy Land in those days. According to an account, Orang Kaya Ali returned to Padang after his father Orang Kaya Said died in Mecca. He then demanded that the position of the headman of Muar be temporarily given and held by his cousin named Omar Junid acting in that position, during a time in the absence of the late Omar. However the request was rejected by Sultan Ali of Johor because his age is still young and unsuitable to hold the position of the headman, a position as the royal government officer and the Muar representative of the Sultan.

To find solutions, Sultan Ali appointed him as a minister. However, the appointment failed to satisfy Ali and his followers because the position does not give any meaning to the administration in the region of Muar. Thus, disputes arose between Ali's followers and Omar's supporters causing the two groups to fight and raise the flag of their group, red for Ali and white for Omar that continued for several months and forced the Sultan to come to Muar to handle and settle the situation between the followers of the two groups. To avoid bloodshed, the Sultan gave approval to the followers of Ali to open a new area in the southern part of Muar to enable Ali to be appointed headman. Orang Kaya Ali retreated to the south coast in the Malacca Strait riding a big boat weighing about one ton bringing together adequate ration of food for 30 days and 16 followers to find new areas suitable opening a villages. After landing in an area about 30 km from Muar, followers of Ali opened a village and planted various trees and crops like durian, 'talas' and paddy. Eventually, the new villages were developed and became prosperous and famous across Muar. Ali along with his followers sailed along the coast of the Malacca Strait which was infested with a lot of pirates to the harvested crop to the sultan.

The name "Sungai Balang" was immortalized for the village as the bravery and successes of Orang Kaya Ali and his followers opening the new areas and sailing along the coast to present the agricultural products had successfully eliminated piracy in the Malacca Strait which inspired Sultan Ali's decree in naming Sungai Balang after their courage against the pirates in the Malacca Straits which were considered as great prowess achieved only by warlords (Hulubalang in Malay).

According to history, Mukim Sungai Balang was a gazetted area including Sarang Buaya Kiri, Sarang Buaya Kanan and Sungai Balang and administered by a headman titled "Orang Kaya" and the two vice-headman. This administration ended in 1954 when the three areas were merged into a county (mukim) and given the name Mukim Sungai Balang.

Among the historic reminiscences in Sungai Balang existing today is the grave of Orang Kaya Ali in the Muslim cemetery in the town and the village primary school named Sekolah Kebangsaan Orang Kaya Ali after the founder of Sungai Balang.

One of the descendants of Orang Kaya Ali is his grandson who still living, Abdul Manaf bin Abu Bakar, owner of Toko Buku Manaf, the already closed famous bookstore in Jalan Abdullah, Muar. While the descendants of Orang Kaya Omar (headman Muar) is the cousin of Orang Kaya Ali, is the former Speaker of the Parliament-Dewan Rakyat, the late Tan Sri Mohamad Noah bin Omar.

== Geography ==
The mukim spans over an area of 99 km^{2}.
