= Sultan Ismail Bridge =

Sungai Muar Bridge Jambatan Sultan Ismail جمبتن سلطان اسماعيل
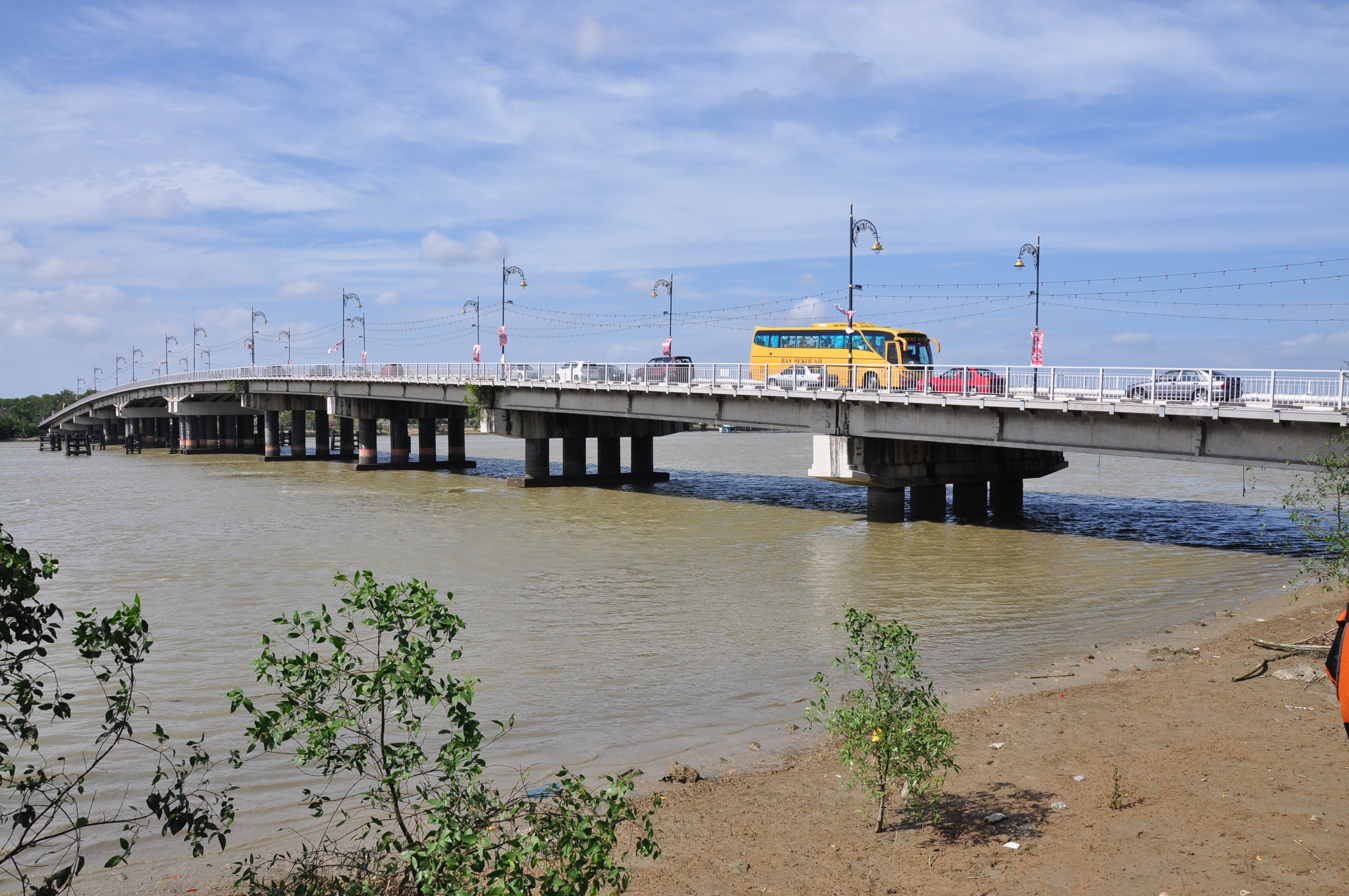
- Coordinates: 2°03′04″N 102°34′01″E
- Carries: Motor vehicles, Pedestrians
- Crosses: Muar River
- Locale: Federal Route 5, Muar
- Official name: Sultan Ismail Bridge
- Maintained by: Malaysian Public Works Department (JKR) Muar and Tangkak; Selia Selenggara Sdn Bhd; Majlis Perbandaran Muar (MPMuar); Majlis Daerah Tangkak (MDTangkak)

Characteristics
- Design: box girder
- Total length: 385 m
- Width: 9 m
- Longest span: –

History
- Designer: Government of Malaysia; Malaysian Public Works Department (JKR)
- Constructed by: Malaysian Public Works Department (JKR)
- Opened: 1967

Location
- Interactive map of Sungai Muar Bridge

The Sultan Ismail Bridge (Malay: Jambatan Sultan Ismail; Jawi: جمبتن سلطان اسماعيل) is a bridge in Muar town across the Muar River in Johor, Malaysia. It was the first bridge built across a river that connects Bandar Maharani, Muar to Tanjung Agas which is now named as part of Tangkak district. The bridge replaced old ferry services in the 1960s. The bridge was originally a toll bridge making the second toll bridge in Malaysia after Sultan Yahya Petra Bridge in Kelantan (opened in 1967).

== History ==
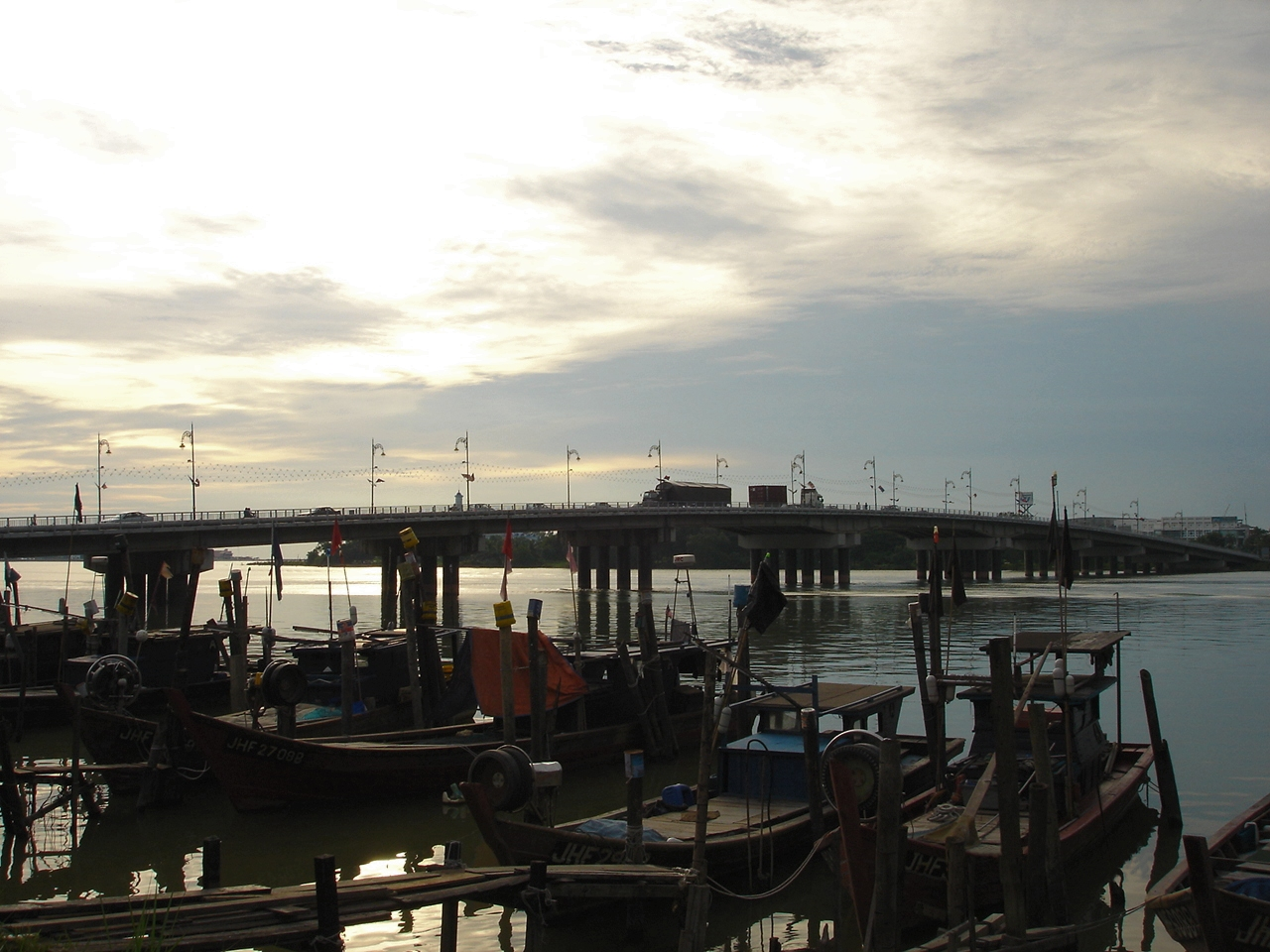
Scene of the Sultan Ismail Bridge at evening

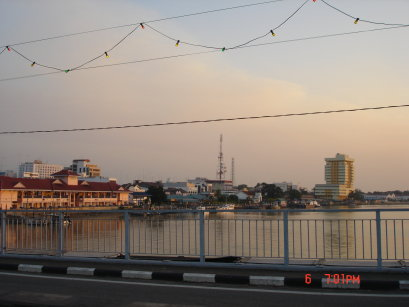
Scene of Muar River bank from Sultan Ismail Bridge

=== Before construction ===
Before construction, the people who want to Cross (call for the Tanjung Agas and Malacca) had crossed the Muar river using the ferry facility called Penambang which began operating around 1890 since Muar was officially opened by the late Sultan of Johor, Almarhum Sultan Abu Bakar.

Due to the rapid development time, felt unable to cope Penambang vehicles wishing to cross the Muar River. Travel by ferry is quite time-consuming and even dangerous especially during flood season. Therefore, the proposal was made to build a bridge that will connect to Tanjung Agas Muar Town and Malacca.

Originally, the government planned to build a bridge across Sungai Batu Pahat alone. But after receiving pressure from Muar residents, the government added a proposal to build a bridge to Muar and Batu Pahat. Proposal to build two bridges that have been included in the Second Malaya Plan (1961–1966) by the Malayan Public Works Department (JKR) and it was announced by the Minister of Public Works, Tun VT Sambanthan.

The Government then open invitation to tender in 1960 and received 25 tenders from 10 firms who are interested in the two of them are from the French company based here. The government had to wait almost 4 years to get financing to build the bridge.

Finally, in July 1964 the government announced that two local companies Wing Co. Ltd. and Development Services Ltd has won the tender of RM5.2 million for the two bridges Muar and Batu Pahat.

=== Project costs ===
Initially, the government estimated allocation of RM8 million for the construction of both the bridge and the government finally succeeded in obtaining financing proceeds of RM9 million loan from Chase Manhattan Bank.

The government has allocated RM3.25 million for construction work. The work was initiated at the end of construction in 1965 and was completed in early 1967. They are built just 1.5 kilometres from the Tangga Batu Penambang Ferry Terminal.

=== Constructions ===
The bridge over 1,264 feet (385 meters) is constructed with an area of 24 feet (7.3 meters) of the vehicle lanes, 8 feet (2.4 meters) for bike paths / bike, and 5 feet (1.5 meters) of sidewalks. It can accommodate a load of 500 tons for each 100 feet (30 meters).

To complete this bridge, 4 pontoons used to carry concrete mixers, cement, sand and cranes weighing up to 120 with 50 ton lift in which a total of 2 piers built specifically to fit the mould of concrete beams.

The bridge was built on 48 piles of special steel imported from Germany and reinforced concrete piles 82. It is estimated that more than 9,000 cubic meters of concrete and 2100 tons of steel and a workforce of 130 people was used during the construction of the bridge.

With the construction of this bridge, road users from Johor Bahru to Malacca when it has saved about 64 miles by road from Segamat–Tangkak–Jasin.

To handle the influx of traffic due to the construction of the bridge. Four roundabouts was built at a cost of RM1 million in every locations including Jalan Yahya roundabout, Bentayan roundabout, Sulaiman roundabout and Khalidi roundabout.

=== Opening ===
The Muar bridge was officially opened by the late Sultan of Johor, Almarhum Sultan Sir Ismail Al-Khalidi ibni Almarhum Sultan Sir Ibrahim Al-Masyhur on Saturday, 16 April 1967 at 10.30 am and was named officially as the Sultan Ismail Bridge. The inauguration was witnessed by thousands of people who first opened and crossed the Muar River to use the bridge. Following the opening of the bridge, the Penambang ferry service was terminated effective midnight Friday, 15 April 1967.

=== Tolls ===
The Sultan Ismail Bridge is the second toll bridge in Malaysia after Sultan Yahya Petra Bridge in Kelantan (opened in 1967). The RM80,000 toll plaza was built in Tanjung Agas for toll collection to cover the cost of the building of the bridge.

Initially, the government announced that tolls are charged RM0.25 for motorbikes, RM0.75 to RM1.75 for cars and heavy vehicles such as trucks and buses.

After opening, the price raised to RM0.50 toll for motorbikes, RM1.50 for cars and taxis and RM3.50 for heavy vehicles such as trucks and buses. This has invited objections from residents, particularly taxi and bus operators where at first they boycotted the use of the bridge.

After numerous objections made mainly from traders and industrial sectors, starting 1 July 1971, the second Prime Minister, Tun Abdul Razak has announced a reduction to RM0.50 toll for cars and RM1.00 for heavy vehicles such as trucks and buses, while for motorcyclists it is free.

Tun Abdul Razak then visit to Muar in May 1975, he announced that the toll charged for Sultan Ismail Bridge Muar would be abolished.

== Today ==
=== Current developments ===
Between the 1990s and the 2000s, traffic congestion occurred at the Sultan Ismail Bridge since the official opening of the North–South Expressway Southern Route between Ayer Keroh and Pagoh and the opening of the Tangkak and Pagoh Interchange on 1 April 1989. To this end, in 1998, the federal government announced that the new second bridge would be built at Parit Bunga to ease congestion on the existing bridge. The second bridge was constructed between March 2001 and June 2003 and was officially opened to traffic in 2004 alongside the opening of the Muar Bypass.

=== New main events ===
On 25 November 2012, in conjunction with the birthday of the sultan of Johor, Sultan Ibrahim Ismail ibni Almarhum Sultan Iskandar Al-Haj (birth date: 22 November 2012) and the Declaration of Bandar Maharani Muar as a Royal Town of Johor, for the first time in history, after 45 years of opening to traffic, Sultan Ismail Bridge was closed for about 12 hours, from 3:00 pm to 5:00 am.

The closure of the bridge was to allow the people to witness the decorated boat parade and fireworks display at the Sultan Ismail Bridge. In addition to these events, stalls were opened for the public to relax on the bridge.

== See also ==
- Muar
- Muar River
- Muar Bypass
- Muar Second Bridge
- Malaysia Federal Route 5
