= Muar River =

River in Johor and Negeri Sembilan, Malaysia

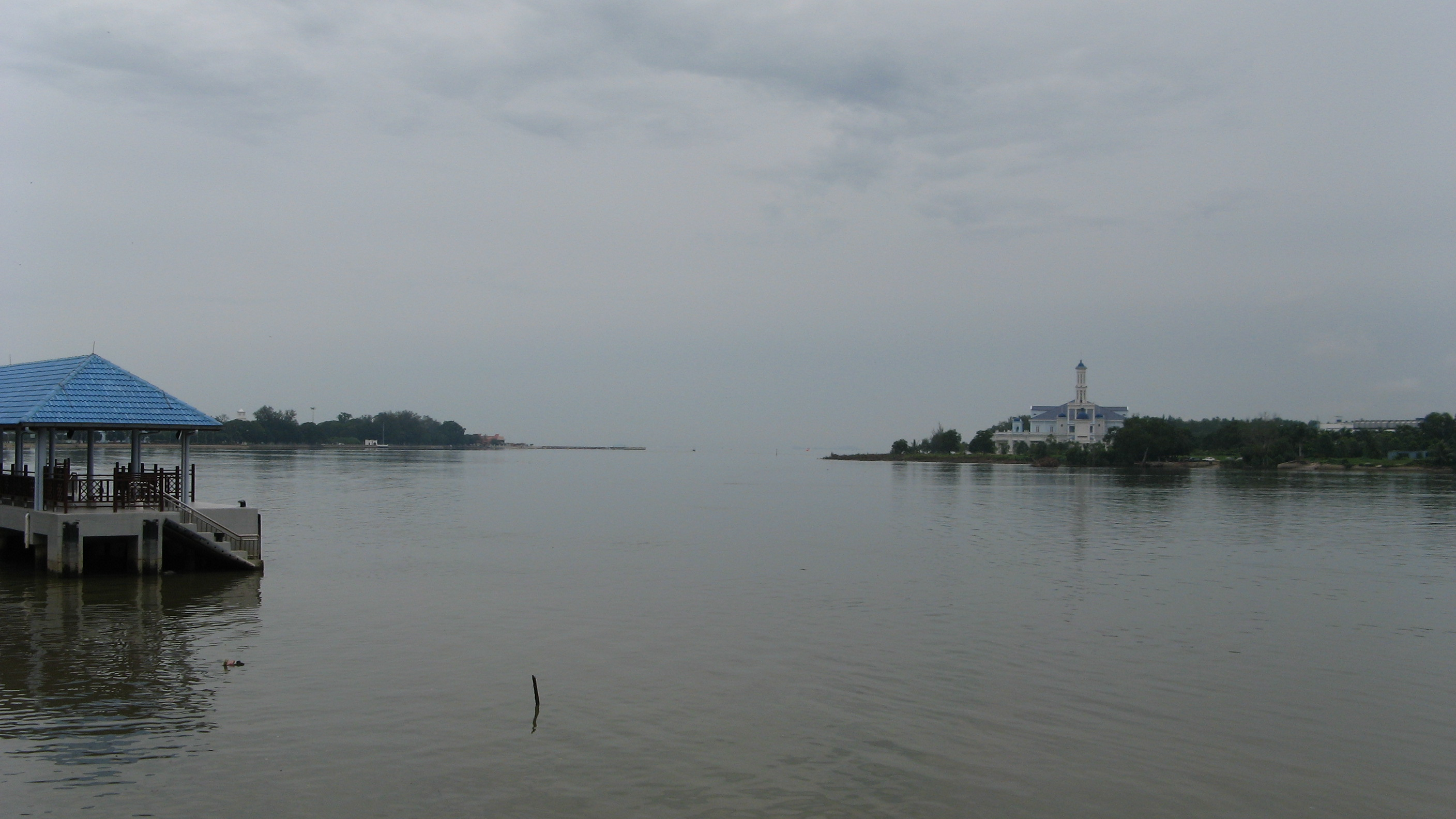
- Muar River mouth, at its namesake town
- Native name: Sungai Muar (Malay)

Location
- Country: Malaysia
- State(s): Negeri Sembilan and Johor

Physical characteristics
- Source: Titiwangsa Mountains
  - location: Telapak Buruk-Berembun massif near Kampung Talang, Kuala Pilah District, Negeri Sembilan
- Mouth: Strait of Malacca
  - location: Muar, Muar District and Tanjung Agas, Tangkak District, Johor
  - coordinates: 2°03′N 102°34′E
- Length: 250 km

The Muar River (Malay: Sungai Muar) is a river which flows through the states of Negeri Sembilan and Johor in Malaysia. Its drainage basin encompasses the states aforementioned as well as the states of Pahang and Malacca.

Measuring around 250 km (155 mi) in length, the Muar is the third longest river in Peninsular Malaysia after the rivers of Pahang and Perak, slightly longer than the Kelantan River. It is one of the two major Negri rivers, the other being the Linggi, as well as the second most significantly important river in Johor after the Johor River.

== History ==
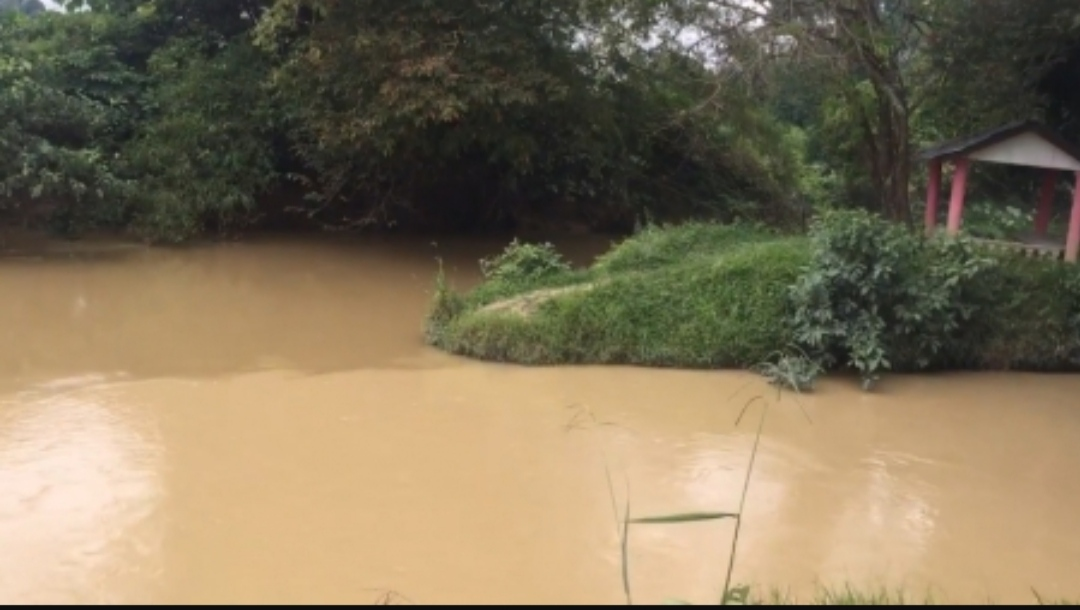
Midpoint of the Penarikan Route, Bahau, Negeri Sembilan. The Muar River is the river to the left of Jempol River in the foreground.

The Muar River formed part of the Penarikan, an ancient overland trade route, which was a short-cut from the west to the east coast of the Malay Peninsula.

== Course ==
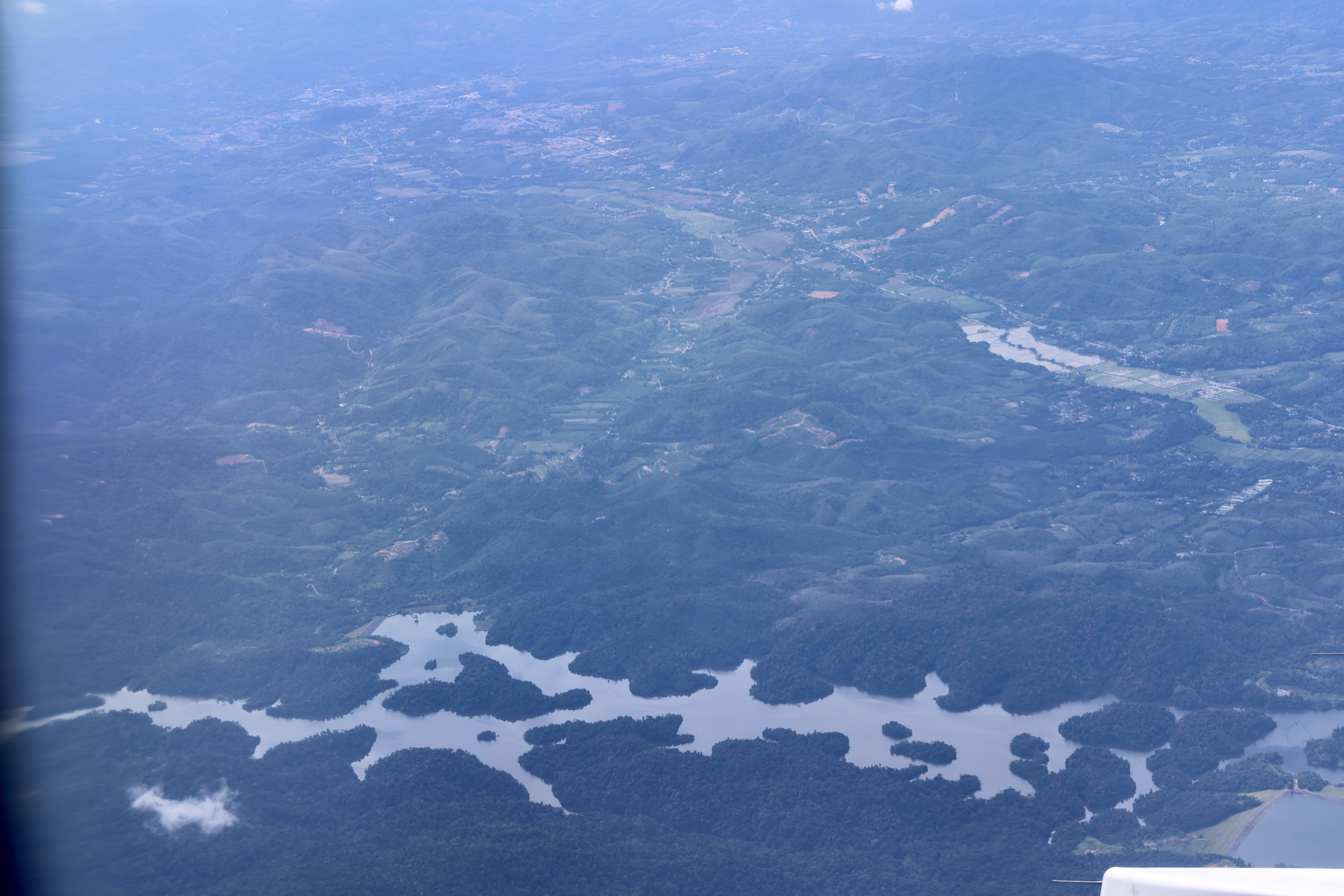
Aerial view of the southern shore of Talang Reservoir in Terachi, Negeri Sembilan, where the Muar River originated.

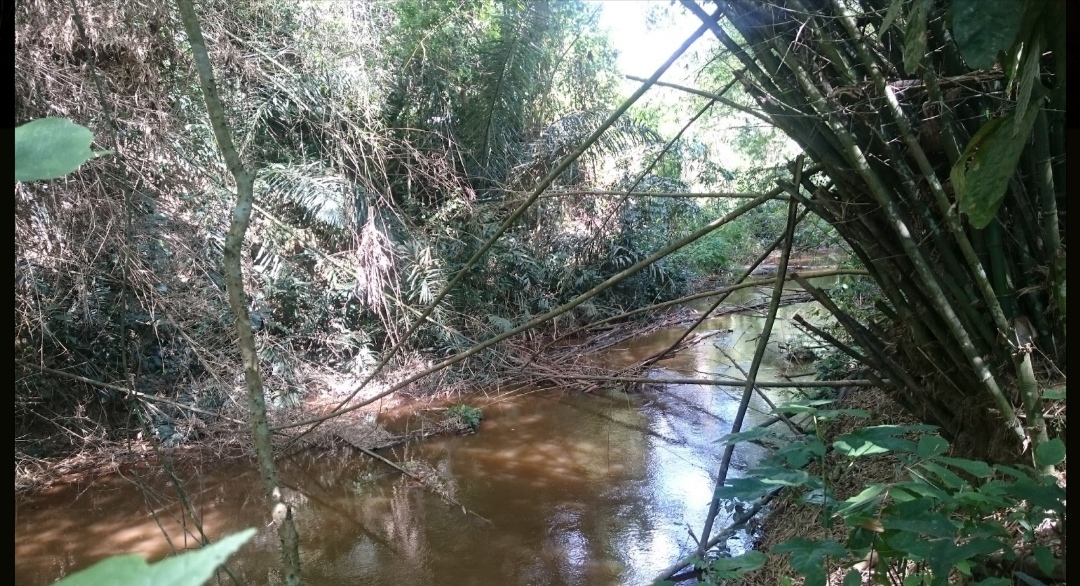
The Muar River, a few metres from its source

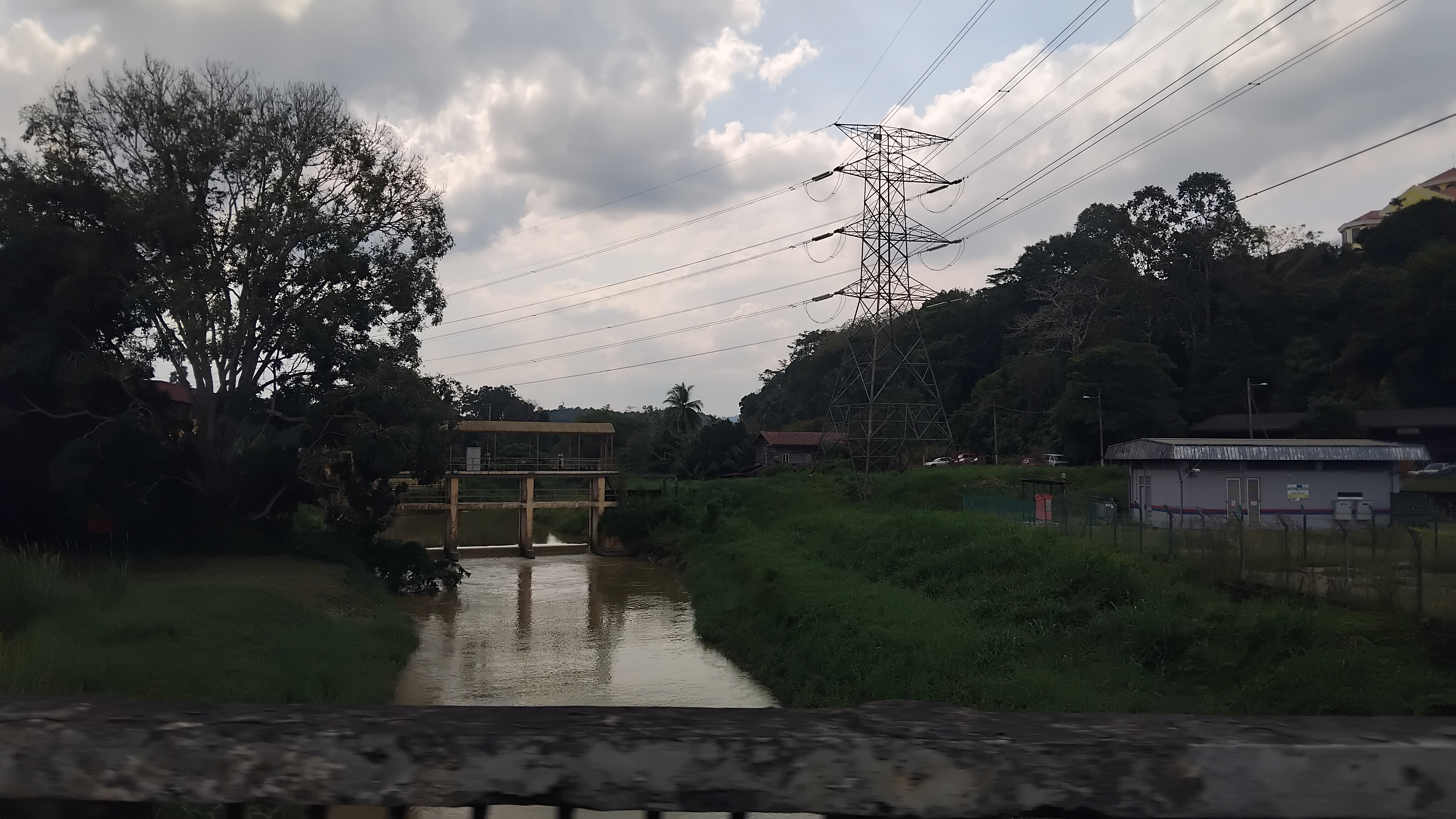
A floodgate spans the river near downtown Kuala Pilah, looking upstream.

The source of the Muar River is located in Talang, Kuala Pilah District, Negeri Sembilan, deep in the Telapak Buruk-Berembun massif in the Titiwangsa Range. It was impounded by the Talang Dam, becoming Talang Lake, to meet the needs of water supply in Kuala Pilah and the entire state. From the dam, the river then flows south into the town centre and Juasseh within the same district, the west side of Bahau and Rompin in Jempol District and Pasir Besar in Tampin District, and flows all the way into the border with Johor. The Johorean portion starts from FELDA Palong Timur to Buloh Kasap (both in Segamat District). Its course then shift westwards, subsequently demarcating the border between Tangkak and Muar Districts.

The Muar River is an excellent example of a meander in the last 12 miles of its length before entering the sea.

=== Basin extent ===
From the source to its mouth, including tributaries, the Muar River basin covers the states of Negeri Sembilan (Kuala Pilah, Jempol and Tampin Districts), Pahang (Bera District), Malacca (Jasin District) and Johor (Segamat, Tangkak and Muar Districts).

== Bridges ==
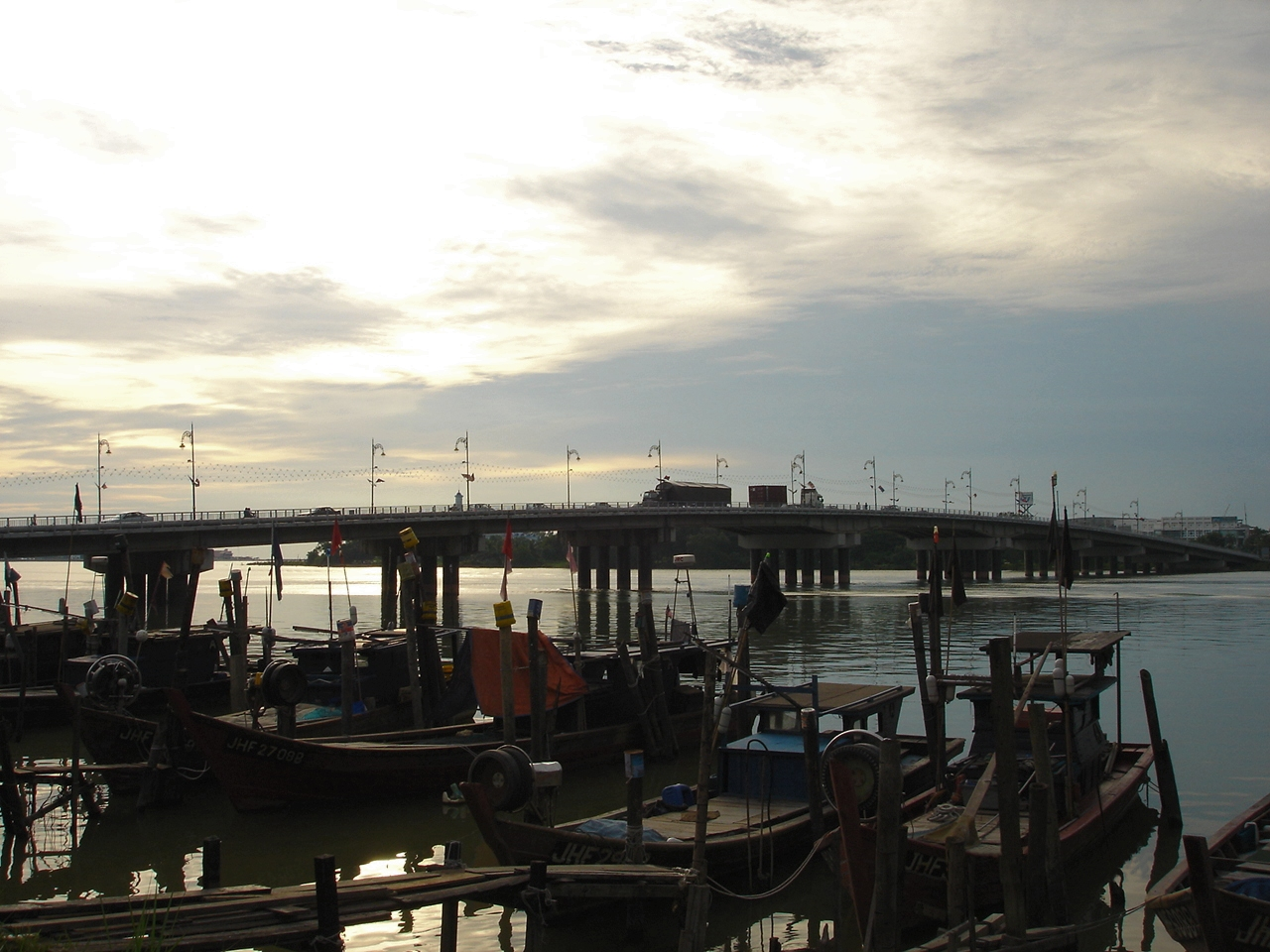
Sultan Ismail Bridge

The river is bridged by two bridges in Muar town. The old bridge, Sultan Ismail Bridge, was built in 1967 to replace the ferry service. An auxiliary bridge, the Muar Second Bridge, was completed in 2005, connecting Parit Bunga on the Tangkak side with the eastern outskirts of Muar town. Further upstream, there are many minor bridges along the river in Pagoh, Segamat and Negeri Sembilan.

== Attractions along the river ==
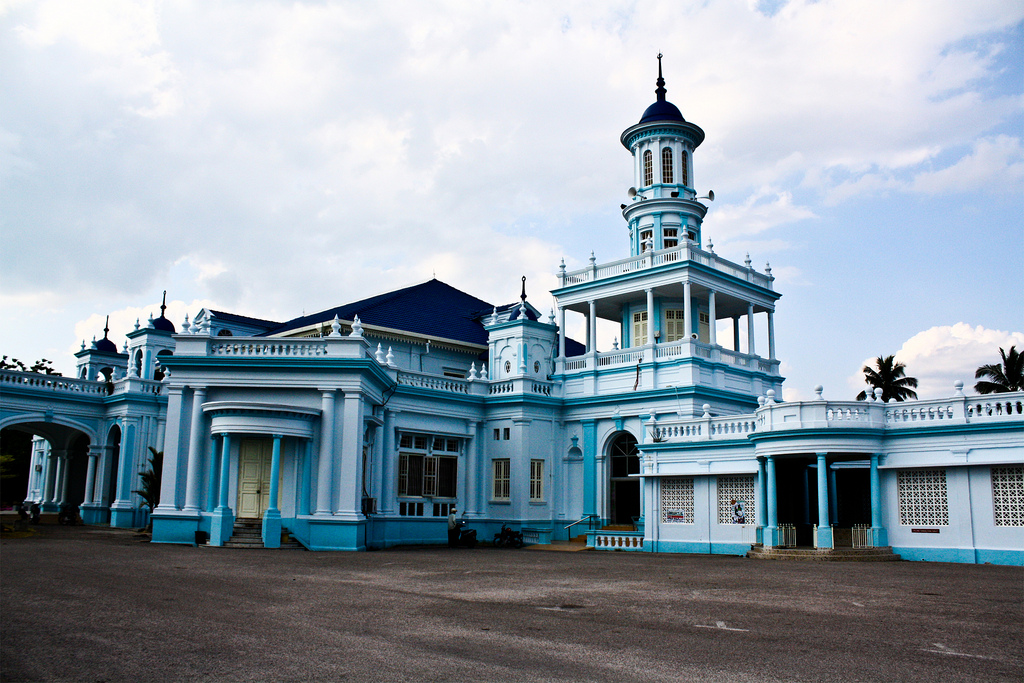
Sultan Ibrahim Jamek Mosque, Muar

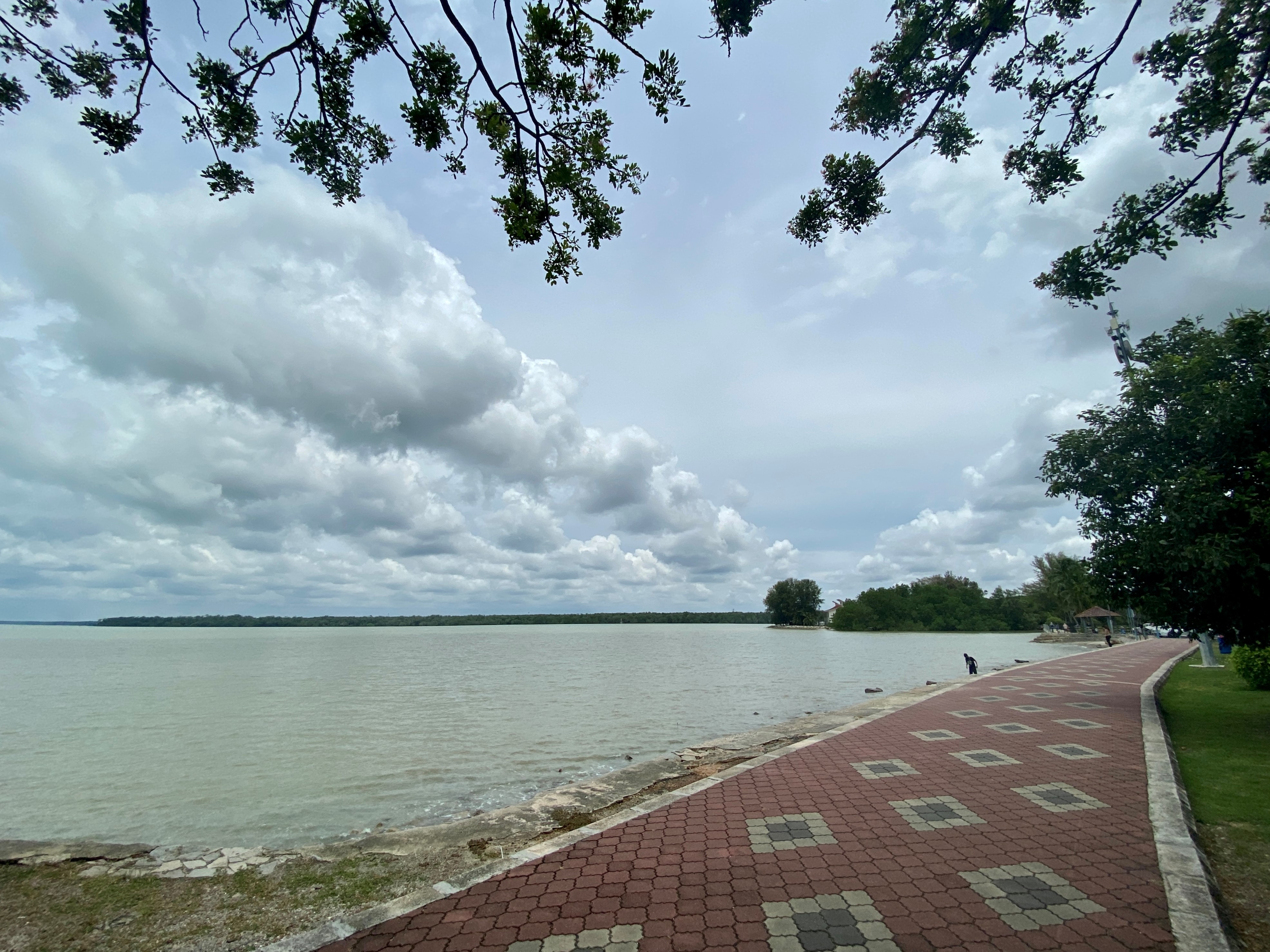
An esplanade in Tanjung Emas, overlooking the river.

One of the attractions of the Muar River is Taman Tanjung Emas, the Muar town's recreational park, which is located at the estuary of the Muar River. It is outlined by a picturesque esplanade overlooking the scenic river. Oyster catchers can be seen daily at low tide collecting oysters for making o-chien at the local food stalls. The park also houses a nine-hole golf course, which is much visited during the weekends. Tanjung Emas is also houses the main jetty of Muar River Cruise, where tourists will embark a trip along the river on a passenger boat. The river cruise operates every weekend, school and public holidays, except Wednesdays.

There are two Jamek Mosques along the Muar River. The older Sultan Ibrahim Jamek Mosque, which was built in 1927, has been a major landmark of the town for many years. The Sultan Ibrahim Jamek Mosque is situated in Muar town, on the southern bank of the Muar River. Its design incorporated many British influences due to its construction during the British colonial period. It has a prominent four-storey minaret in its backyard. The newer Second Sultan Ismail Jamek Mosque, which is located at the northern bank of the Muar River in Tanjung Agas, is the latest icon of Muar town as well as the river. Completed in 2002, it is also the biggest mosque in town. The second mosque's design is similar to the earlier mosque. Both mosques offer a breathtaking scenery when viewed from the mouth of the Muar River.

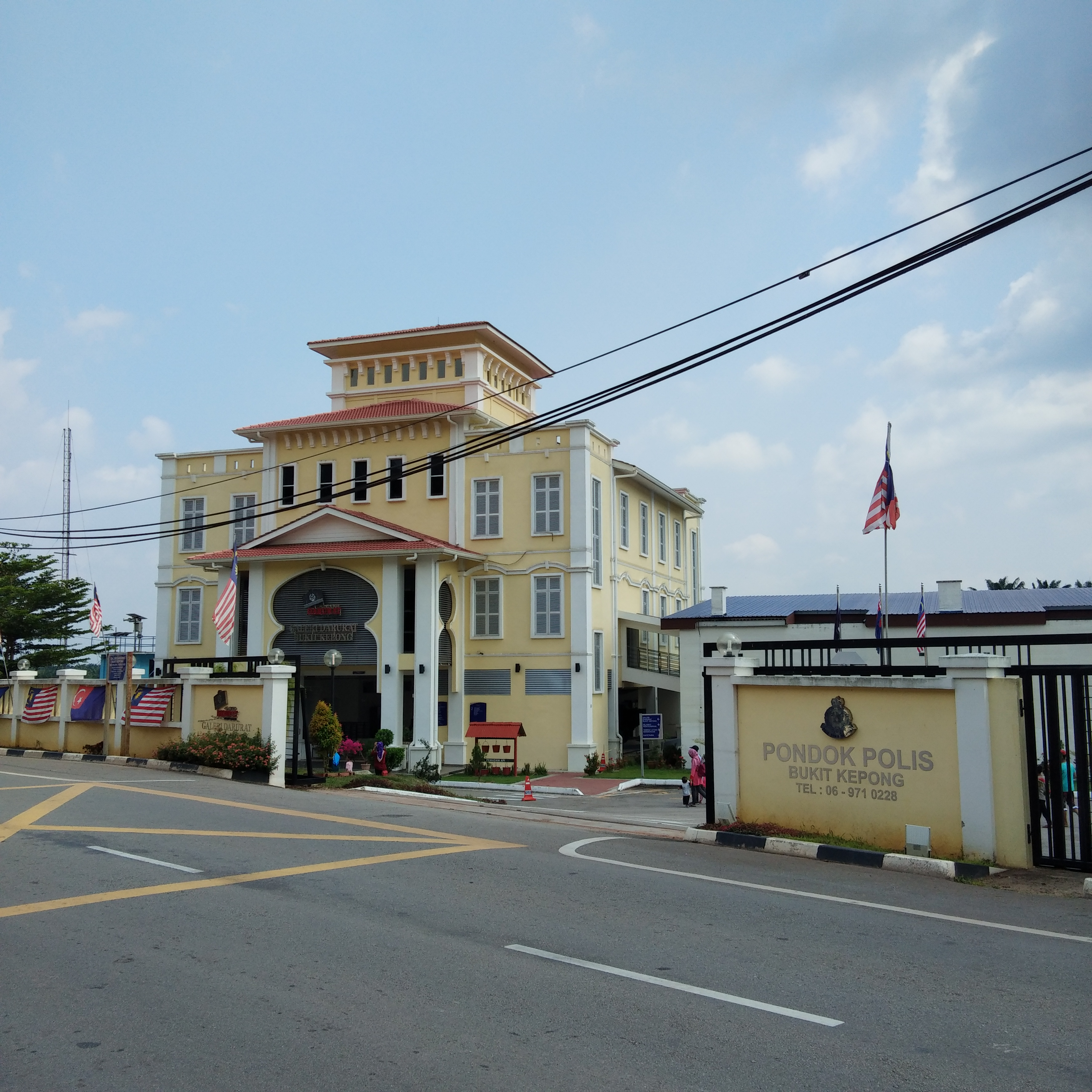
Emergency Gallery, Bukit Kepong

Going further upstream, the hamlet of Bukit Kepong is infamous for being the site of the tragic Bukit Kepong incident, where the ill-fated old Bukit Kepong Police Station witnessed a gruesome guerilla between the Federation of Malaya Police and the Malayan National Liberation Army of the Malayan Communist Party. The incident ended with victory being on the latter's side, and rendered around 66 people KIA. The Emergency Gallery (Malay: Galeri Darurat) was built next to the rebuilt Bukit Kepong Police Station and the cemetery of the fallen, to commemorate the incident.

On the Negri stretch of the river, the town of Bahau is located at the midpoint of the Laluan Penarikan, where traders will have to pull their boats off the Muar heading to the Serting River (a tributary of the Pahang) to get to the east coast.

== See also ==
- Laluan Penarikan
- List of rivers of Malaysia
