= Muar District =

District in Johor, Malaysia

- District of Johor
- Daerah Muar
- Flag

- Location of Muar District in Johor
- Interactive map of Muar District
- Location of Muar District in Malaysia
- Coordinates: 2°9′N 102°40′E
- Country: Malaysia
- State: Johor
- Seat: Muar
- Local area government(s): Muar Municipal Council

Government
  - District officer: Tuan Haji Mustaffa Kamal bin Haji Shamsudin

Area
  - Total: 1,354 km^{2} (523 sq mi)

Population (2010)
  - Total: 233,779
  - Density: 172.7/km^{2} (447.2/sq mi)
- Time zone: UTC+08:00 (MST)
  - Summer (DST): UTC+08:00 (Not observed)
- Postcode: 84xxx
- Calling code: +6-06
- Vehicle registration plates: J

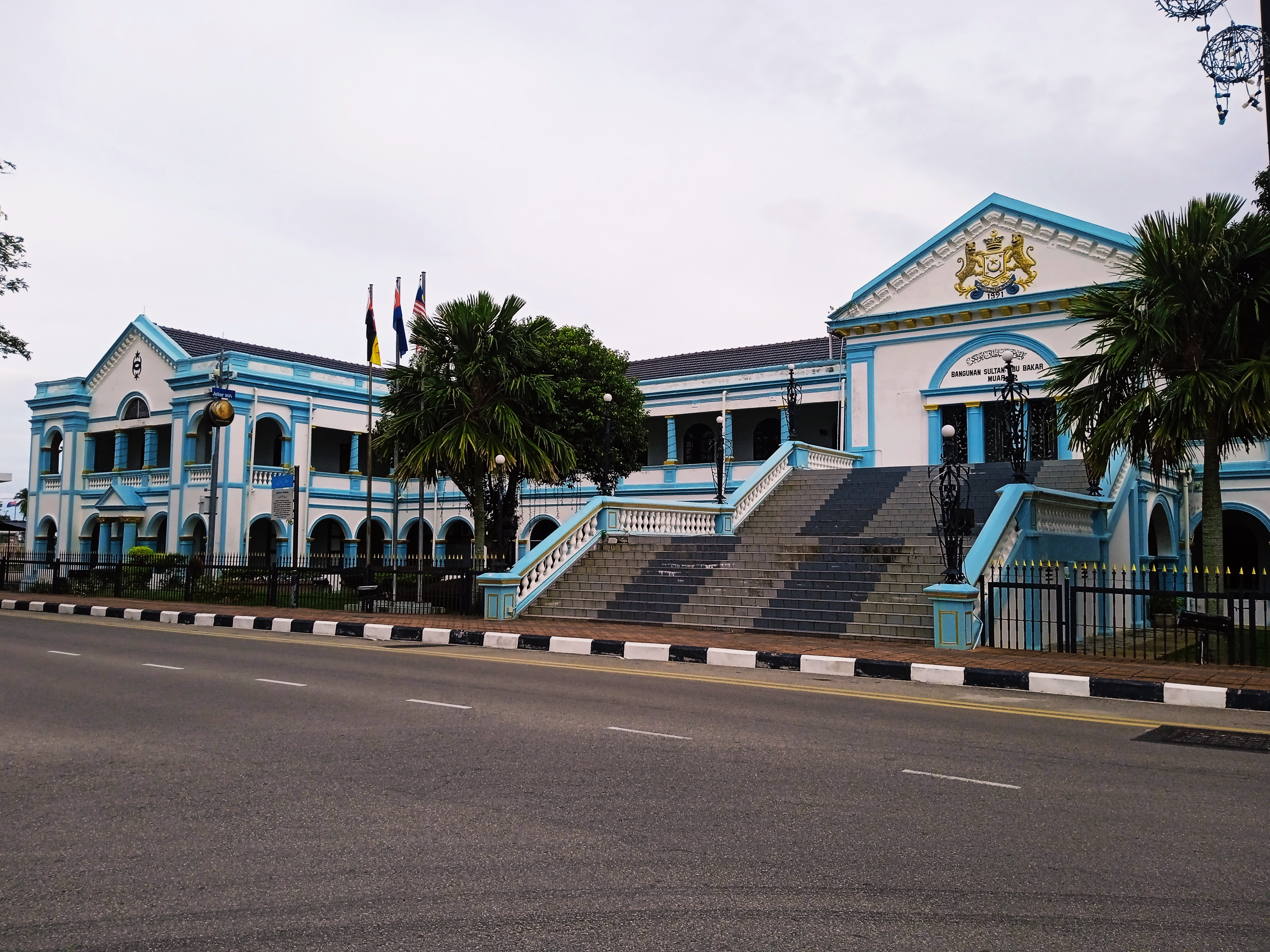
Sultan Abu Bakar Building which houses the Muar District Office

The Muar District is a district in Johor, Malaysia. Muar is located at the mouth of the Muar River, on the coast of the Straits of Malacca. The Muar District covers 1,354 km^{2} (523 sq mi), with a population of 233,779 (2010).

The district borders Tangkak District to the west, Segamat District to the north, and Batu Pahat District to the east.

== History ==
The district was formerly divided administratively into Bandar Maharani municipality and Tangkak township. Upon upgrade of Tangkak sub-district to full-fledged Tangkak District (initially Ledang), Bandar Maharani is now administered by Muar Municipal Council (formerly South Muar Town Council, later Muar Town Council) under the Muar District Office, while Tangkak of Ledang is administered by Tangkak Town Council (formerly North Muar Town Council) under the Tangkak (formerly Ledang) District Office.

A new administration hub and transportation hub integrated with bus terminal and market called Maharani Sentral are being planned to be built at the location near Muar Bypass in between Jalan Haji Kosai and Jalan Temenggung.

== Administrative divisions ==

Muar District is divided into 12 mukims, which are:

- Ayer Hitam (Note: Not to be confused by a town of the same name in Batu Pahat District.)
- Bukit Kepong
- Jalan Bakri
- Jorak
- Lenga
- Muar Town
- Parit Bakar
- Parit Jawa
- Seri Menanti
- Sungai Balang
- Sungai Raya
- Sungai Terap

== Towns ==
- Muar
- Pagoh
- Parit Jawa
- Sungai Balang
- Bukit Kepong
- Bukit Pasir
- Panchor
- Lenga
- Pekan Bakri, Jalan Bakri
- Bukit Naning

== Demographics ==
Historical population
Year	Pop.	±%
1991	301,804	—
2000	330,355	+9.5%
2010	239,027	−27.6%
2020	314,776	+31.7%
Figures before 2008 includes Tangkak District. Source:

== Federal Parliament and State Assembly Seats ==
=== List of Muar district representatives in the Federal Parliament (Dewan Rakyat) ===
Parliament	Seat Name	Member of Parliament	Party
P143	Pagoh	Muhyiddin Yassin	PN - BERSATU
P145	Bakri	Tan Hong Pin	PH - DAP
P146	Muar	Syed Saddiq Syed Abdul Rahman	MUDA

=== List of Muar district representatives in the State Legislative Assembly (Dewan Negeri) ===
Parliament	State	Seat Name	State Assemblyman	Party
P143	N7	Bukit Kepong	Sahruddin Jamal	PN - BERSATU
P143	N8	Bukit Pasir	Mohamad Fazli Mohamad Salleh	BN - UMNO
P145	N12	Bentayan	Ng Yak Howe	PH - DAP
P145	N13	Simpang Jeram	Nazri Abdul Rahman	PH - AMANAH
P145	N14	Bukit Naning	Mohd Fuad Tukirin	BN - UMNO
P146	N15	Maharani	Abdul Aziz Talib	PN - PAS
P146	N16	Sungai Balang	Selamat Takim	BN - UMNO

== Economy ==
The main economy activities in the district are education, trading, furniture manufacturing, historical tourism and agritourism.

== See also ==
- Districts of Malaysia
