= Malaysia Federal Route 5 =

Road in Malaysia

Federal Route 5

Route information
- Maintained by Malaysian Public Works Department
- Length: 655.85 km (407.53 mi)
- Existed: 1887–present
- History: Completed in 1988

Major junctions
- North end: Jelapang, Perak
- Roads: FT 317 Jalan Kledang; FT 73 Federal Route 73; FT 109 Federal Route 109; FT 72 Federal Route 72; FT 71 Federal Route 71; FT 60 Sitiawan Bypass; FT 100 Lumut Bypass; FT 18 Federal Route 18; FT 312 Federal Route 312; FT 58 Federal Route 58; FT 69 Federal Route 69; FT 54 Federal Route 54; FT 3217 Federal Route 3217; FT 20 North Klang Straits Bypass; FT 2 Federal Route 2; FT 53 Federal Route 53; FT 219 Federal Route 219; FT 363 Federal Route 363; FT 138 Federal Route 138; FT 139 Federal Route 139; FT 140 Federal Route 140; FT 141 Federal Route 141; FT 33 SPA Highway; FT 192 Federal Route 192; FT 264 Federal Route 264; FT 144 Federal Route 144; FT 19 (AMJ Highway) / FT 5; FT 23 Federal Route 23; FT 24 Federal Route 24; FT 224 Muar Bypass; FT 85 Federal Route 85; FT 50 Federal Route 50; FT 96 Federal Route 96; FT 95 Federal Route 95; FT 1 Federal Route 1; Expressways: West Coast Expressway; New North Klang Straits Bypass / AH141; Shah Alam Expressway
- South end: Skudai, Johor

Location
- Country: Malaysia
- Primary destinations: Perak: Ipoh; Lumut; Teluk Intan; Selangor: Sabak Bernam; Kuala Selangor; Klang; Banting; Negeri Sembilan: Port Dickson; Malacca: Malacca; Johor: Muar; Batu Pahat; Senggarang; Rengit; Benut; Ayer Baloi; Pontian Kechil; Pekan Nanas; Kangkar Pulai; Skudai

Highway system
- Highways in Malaysia; Expressways; Federal; State

Federal Route 5 is one of the three north–south oriented backbone federal roads running along the west coast of Peninsular Malaysia, Malaysia. The 655.85 kilometres (408 mi) federal highway runs from Jelapang, Perak in the north to Skudai, Johor in the south.

== Route background ==
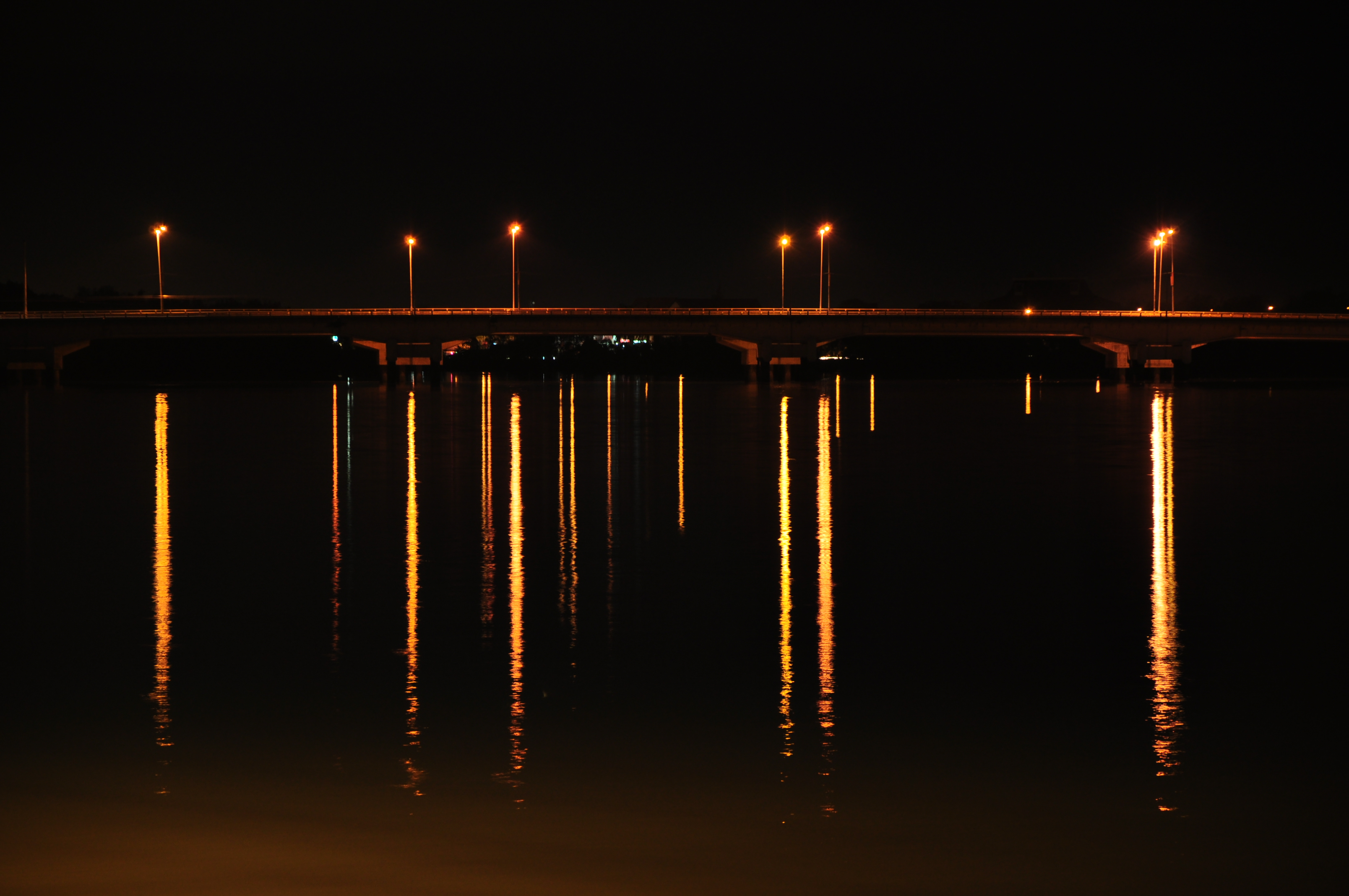
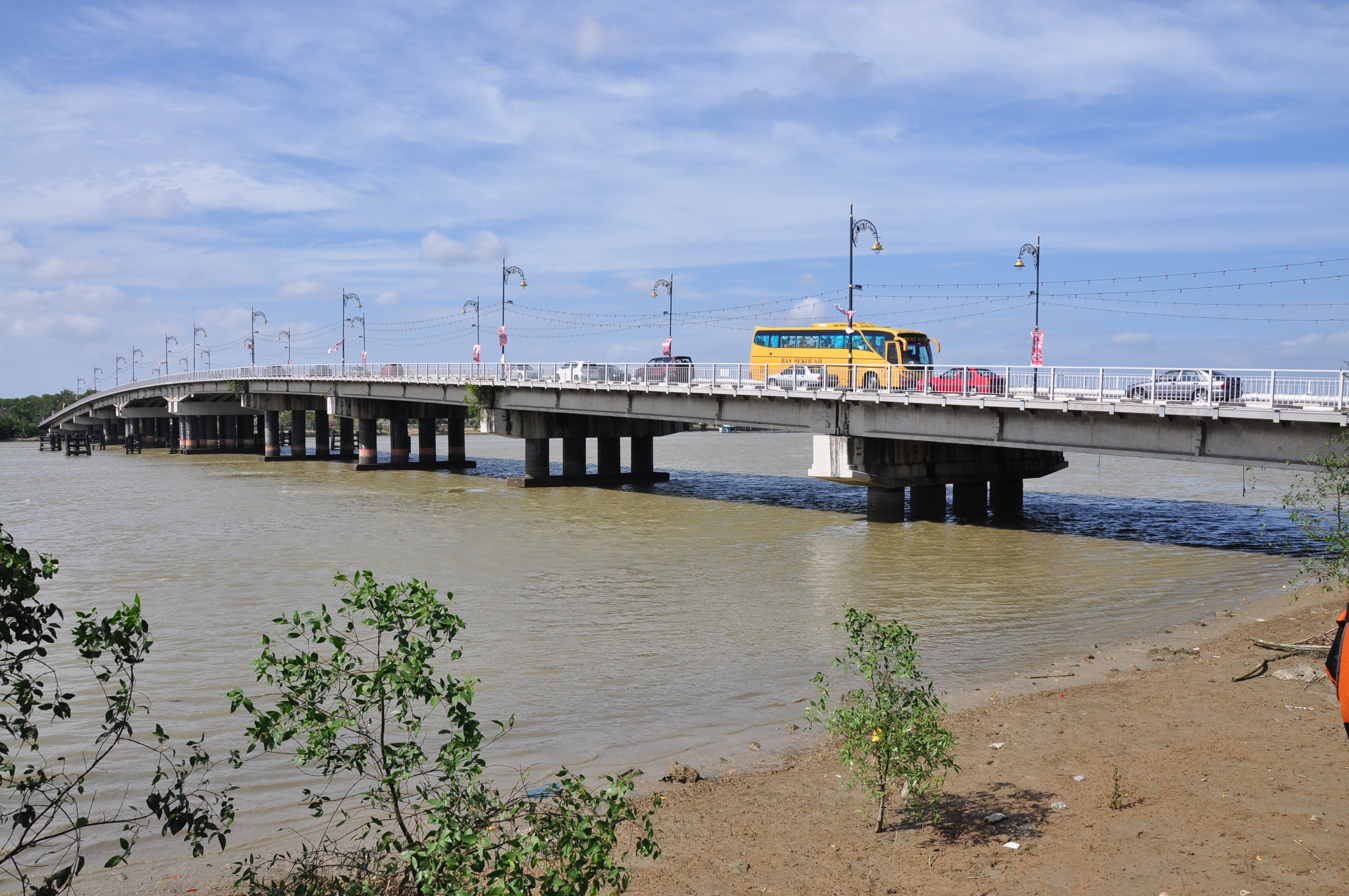
Sultan Salahuddin Abdul Aziz Shah Bridge (Kuala Selangor) (left) and Sultan Ismail Bridge (Muar)(right), two major bridges along the Federal Route 5

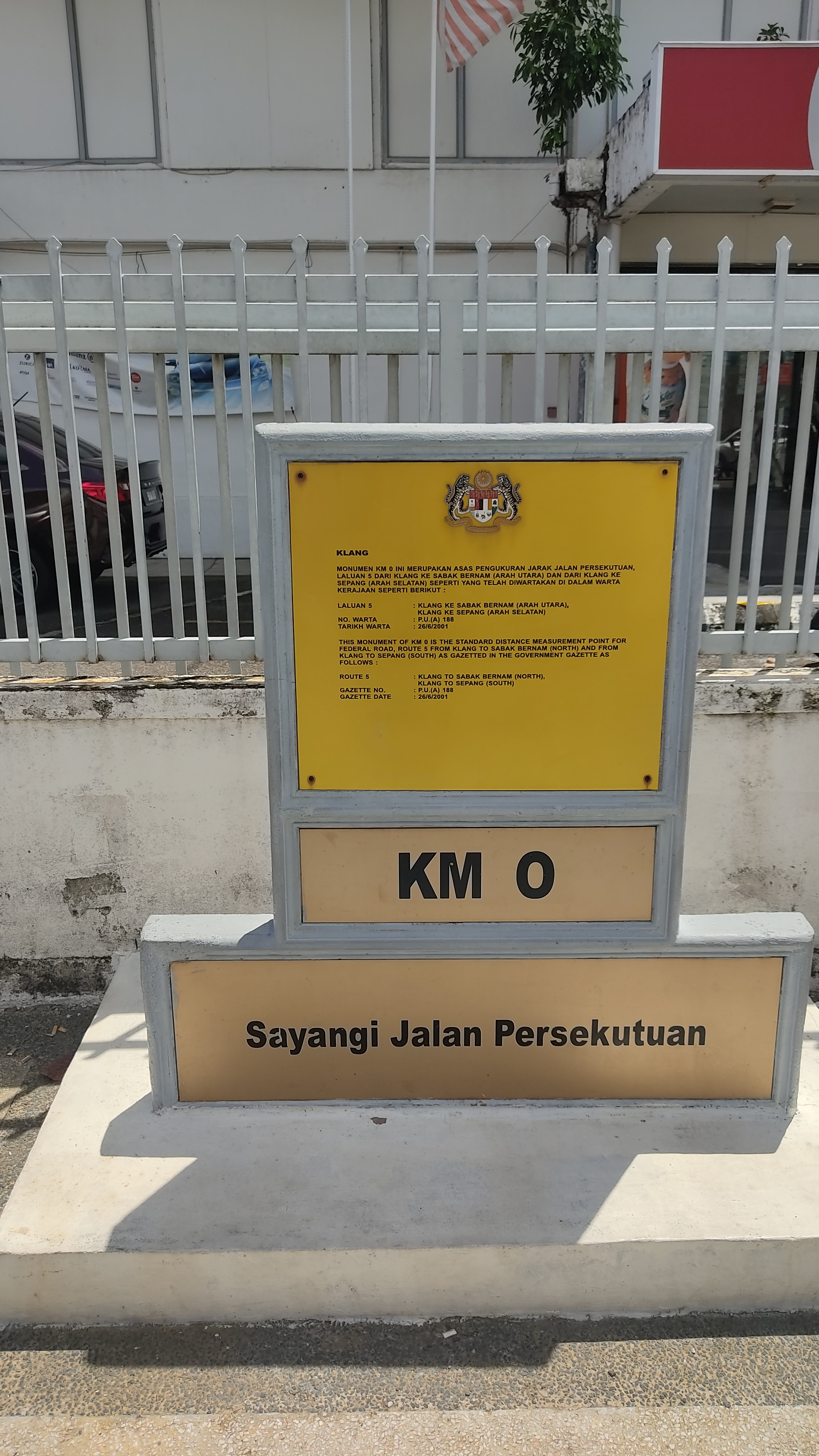
FR5 KM0 Monument in Klang, Selangor

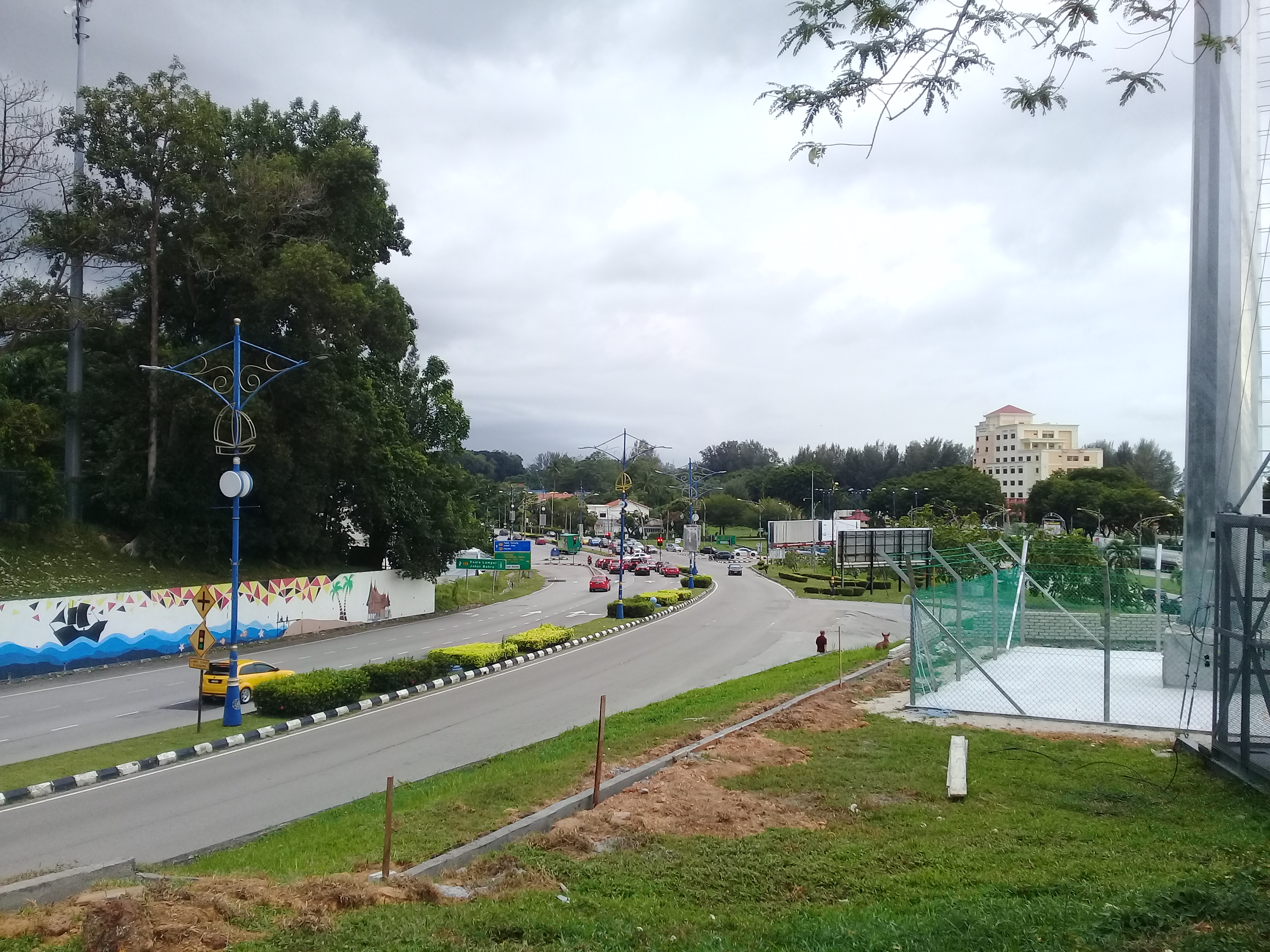
Near Port Dickson, Negeri Sembilan

The Federal Route 5 is one of the three north–south backbone federal highways in Peninsular Malaysia; the other two are the Federal Routes 1 and 3. The FT5 highway is also the shortest among the three backbone federal highways. Generally, the Federal Route 5 runs mostly along the west coast of Peninsular Malaysia.

The Kilometre Zero of the Federal Route 5 is located at Skudai, Johor, at its interchange with the Federal Route 1, the main trunk road of the central of Peninsular Malaysia. It begins as an east–west highway from Skudai to Pontian Kechil. Starting from Pontian Kechil, it becomes the main west coastal trunk road of Peninsular Malaysia. At Batu Pahat, the FT5 highway forms a part of the Batu Pahat–Kluang Road from Banang Roundabout to Mount Soga Intersection, but was signed as FT5; the Batu Pahat–Kluang Road assumes the FT50 designation from Mount Soga Intersection onwards. At Mount Soga Intersection, the FT5 highway is diverted to Jalan Peserai FT5 that forms the Muar–Batu Pahat Road FT5 to Parit Jawa. At Parit Jawa, the FT5 route is diverted to Jalan Abdul Rahman FT5 to Muar, where it passes three roundabouts (Khalidi Roundabout, Sulaiman Roundabout and Bentayan Roundabout) before the FT5 route is diverted once again to Jalan Bakri FT5 at Bentayan Roundabout, which later continues as the Sultan Ismail Bridge FT5 and Jalan Kesang FT5.

At Parit Bunga Interchange, the FT5 route is once again diverted to the left to become AMJ Highway FT5. At Kesang Interchange, the FT5 route is diverted to the two-lane Melaka–Muar Road FT5, while the AMJ Highway itself changes its route number to FT19. Muar–Melaka Road FT5 ends at Duyong Intersection where it overlaps with the AMJ Highway FT19 to Semabok Interchange, where the FT5 route is diverted to Jalan Semabok FT5. At Malacca City, the Federal Route 5 passes through a maze of old streets before it becomes Jalan Tengkera FT5 where it forms a part of the Melaka–Port Dickson Road FT5. The Melaka–Port Dickson Road FT5 ends at Lukut, where the FT5 route is rerouted to Jalan Sepang FT5, while the road itself continues as the Seremban–Port Dickson Road FT53.

At Sepang, the Federal Route 5 is rerouted twice to new route FT5 and Jalan Morib FT5. At Morib, the route is diverted twice to Jalan Kelanang FT5 and then Jalan Sultan Alam Shah FT5 to Banting. At Banting, the FT5 road is rerouted to Jalan Langat FT5 to Klang. At Klang, it overlaps with the Federal Route 2 at Jalan Jambatan Kota FT2/FT5 from Simpang Lima Roundabout Interchange to Simpang Tujuh Roundabout Interchange, where the Federal Route 5 is diverted to Jalan Kapar FT5 which forms a part of the Klang–Teluk Intan Road FT5, while Jalan Jambatan Kota itself continues as the Federal Highway Route 2.

At Mile 5, Klang–Teluk Intan Road FT5 near Batak Rabit, the Federal Route 5 is diverted to Sultan Yusuf Bridge FT5 to Sitiawan, while the Klang–Teluk Intan Road changes its route number to FT58. Starting from Sitiawan, Perak to its northern terminus at Ipoh, the Federal Route 5 ceases to be the main coastal trunk road; its role is taken by Federal Route 60 and Federal Route 1. From Sitiawan, the Federal Route 5 is rerouted for the last time to Ipoh–Lumut Highway FT5 to its northern terminus at Jelapang near Ipoh, where the road is linked to the North–South Expressway E1 and Jalan Kuala Kangsar FT1 via Jalan Jelapang A1.

== History ==
The Federal Route 5 started as a short road from Malacca City to Merlimau, constructed in 1887. About a decade later, another road from Ipoh to Lumut was constructed, featuring the Bota Bridge that crossed the Perak River. In 1911, the state government of Johor collaborated with the British colonial government to develop a road network from Johor Bahru to Batu Pahat and Muar. As a result, the Batu Pahat–Kluang–Mersing Road was completed in 1919, where the section of the Banang Roundabout to Mount Soga Intersection formed a part of the present-day Federal Route 5.

The next completed section was the Muar–Batu Pahat Road FT5, completed in 1929. At the same time, the Melaka–Merlimau Road FT5 was extended to Muar as well. Also completed at the same time was the Melaka–Port Dickson Road FT5, which was built as an extension of the Seremban–Port Dickson Road which was completed earlier in 1910. In 1939, the coastal road sections in Selangor from Klang to Sepang and from Klang and Teluk Anson was opened to motorists. The Skudai–Pontian Road FT5 and Batu Pahat–Pontian Road FT5 were also completed in the same year.

In 1967, the old Bota Bridge FT5 was collapsed due to a huge flood, effectively cutting off the transportation link between Ipoh and Lumut. As a result, a new replacement bridge known as the Sultan Idris Shah II Bridge FT5 was constructed with the total cost of RM3.1 million. The new Sultan Idris Shah II Bridge FT5 was completed in 1973 and was opened to motorists in February 1973.

Also in 1967, two bridges at Muar and Batu Pahat were opened to motorists as toll bridges. Funded by a RM9 million loan from Chase Manhattan Bank, the federal government began the construction of both bridges in 1965 and was completed in early 1967. The bridge in Muar was named as Sultan Ismail Bridge. Two toll plazas were erected at Tanjung Agas and Peserai respectively. However, due to numerous protests by motorists, the toll rate was reduced in 1971, before the toll collection was fully abolished in 1975.

In 1970, the Kuala Selangor Bridge FT5 was proposed. However, the project sparked a controversy due to delays caused by the failure of the original contractor to complete the job. As a result, a new tender was opened in 1976 to get a new contractor to complete the abandoned Kuala Selangor Bridge construction job. Meanwhile, the construction of the Sabak Bernam Bridge FT5 was started in 1977. The Kuala Selangor Bridge FT5, together with the Sabak Bernam Bridge FT5, were completed in 1980. The bridge in Kuala Selangor was named as Sultan Salahuddin Abdul Aziz Shah Bridge.

The final section being completed was the Teluk Intan–Sitiawan section. Dubbed as the Sungai Perak–Lumut West Coastal Road Project, the final section of the Federal Route 5 was constructed as a project under the Fifth Malaysia Plan. The project included the 1.3-km Sultan Yusuf Bridge FT5, the longest bridge along the Federal Route 5. Before the bridge was built, villagers from the opposite of the Perak River such as Telok Selandang and Kampung Lekir had to use a river ferry service operated by a nearby oil palm estate. Construction of the Sultan Yusuf Bridge began in April 1986 with the total cost of RM27 million for the entire road project. The bridge was completed in 1988 and was opened to motorists on 17 November 1988, resulting in the full completion of the FT5 highway.

The Federal Route 5 remains heavily used by travellers and commuters along the west coast of Peninsular Malaysia and is unaffected by the presence of the North–South Expressway E1 and E2, as the FT5 highway is located far from the E1 and E2 expressways, besides the fact that the FT5 highway passes through the most populated regions in Peninsular Malaysia. As a result, many sections of the FT5 highway have been upgraded either as divided highways or what are termed super four highways (which can be characterized as superstreets or left-in/left-out expressways). For example, the Klang–Teluk Intan Road has been upgraded to a super four highway, while the Ipoh–Lumut Highway FT5, Jalan Langat FT5 and Pontian Highway are all being upgraded to divided highways, in order to handle the increasing amount of traffic.

On 25 May 2015, the long-anticipated West Coast Expressway E32 began its construction after numerous delays. The 233-km controlled-access expressway from Changkat Jering to Banting was built as a coastal alternative to the North–South Expressway E1 and E2 that becomes congested during holidays and festive seasons. However, the expressway construction sparked yet another controversy, as the Tanjong Karang–Hutan Melintang and Teluk Intan–Lekir sections will be using the existing Federal Route 5, heavily violating the controlled-access expressway standards defined in Arahan Teknik 8/86: A Guide on Geometric Design of Roads by Malaysian Public Works Department (JKR), hence the completed expressway may endanger the lives of local villagers and expressway users as well. As a result, the Malaysian Ministry of Works is considering to re-evaluate the alignment of the expressway, especially along the Tanjong Karang–Hutan Melintang section.

The Sungai Rambai bridge FT5 (known as old bridge) connecting Johor and Malacca is cracked on the three pillars. As the result, the JKR decided to closed the bridge.

=== Selangor ===
==== Sepang ====
The FT5 in Sepang town is rerouted to new upgraded road part as Sepang town bypass in conjunction of B48 Jalan Besar Salak and junctions upgrading.

== Route features ==
=== Overlaping ===
State	Road shield	Road Name	Sections
Perak	West Coast Expressway		Lekir–Teluk Intan
Selangor	West Coast Expressway		Sabak–Tanjong Karang
Selangor	FT 2 (Jalan Jambatan Kota)		Klang
Negeri Sembilan	FT 53	Malaysia Federal Route 53	Lukut–Port Dickson
Malacca	FT 19 (AMJ Highway)		Malacca City–Duyong
Johor	FT 19 (AMJ Highway)		Kesang–Parit Bunga

== Junction lists ==
Legend:

- I/C - Interchange, I/S - Intersection, RSA - Rest and service area, OBR - Overhead bridge restaurant, R/R - Restaurant and rest plaza, L/B - Layby, V/P - Vista point, TN - tunnel, T/P - Toll plaza, BR - Bridge
- C - Cloverleaf, S - Stack, T-A - Trumpet-A, T-B - Trumpet-B, DT - Directional-T/Y, SDT - Semi-Directional-T/Y, P-Y - Partial-Y, D - Diamond, P-C - Partial cloverleaf, D-D - Diverging diamond, D-R - Direct ramp

State	District	Location	km	mi	Exit	Name	Destinations	Notes
Perak	Manjung	Sitiawan				Ipoh–Lumut	see also Ipoh–Lumut Highway	
Perak	Manjung	Sitiawan				Sitiawan East	FT 100 Lumut Bypass – Lumut, Pantai Remis, Pangkor Island, Teluk Batik, TLDM Lumut Naval Base; West Coast Expressway – Alor Setar, George Town, Taiping, Beruas, Klang, Kuala Lumpur, Banting	T-junctions
Perak	Manjung	Sitiawan				Kampung Deralik		
Perak	Manjung	Sitiawan				Kampung Serdang		
Perak	Manjung	Sitiawan				Sitiawan	Jalan Lapangan Terbang Sitiawan – Sitiawan Airport	
Perak	Manjung	Sitiawan				Sitiawan	FT 3145 Malaysia Federal Route 3145 – Kampung Acheh; FT 60 Dinding Bypass – Damar Laut, Pantai Remis, Kuala Kangsar, Taiping; FT 18 Malaysia Federal Route 18 – Seri Manjung, Lumut, Pangkor Island, Teluk Batik, TLDM Lumut Naval Base	Junctions
Perak	Manjung	Sitiawan				Sitiawan	Unnamed Road – Taman Ilmu, Manjung Parade, Seri Manjung	Junctions
Perak	Manjung	Sitiawan				Kampung Koh	A176 Jalan Pasir Panjang – Seri Manjung, Hospital Seri Manjung, Manjung power plant, Teluk Rubiah; A125 Perak State Route A125 – Pekan Gurney	Junctions
Perak	Manjung	Sitiawan				Sitiawan Bypass	FT 60 Sitiawan Bypass – Changkat Jering, Taiping, Pantai Remis, Damar Laut, Seri Manjung, Lumut, Pangkor Island, Teluk Batik, Teluk Rubiah, TLDM Lumut Naval Base, Seri Manjung Hospital, Manjung power plant West Coast Expressway – Alor Setar, George Town, Taiping, Beruas, Klang, Kuala Lumpur, Banting	T-junctions
Perak	Manjung	Sitiawan				Parit Besar Sitiawan		
Perak	Manjung	Lekir				Kilang Kelapa Sawit Lekir	Jalan Kilang Kelapa Sawit Lekir; West Coast Expressway – Alor Setar, George Town, Ipoh, Taiping, Trong, Beruas, Teluk Intan, Sabak Bernam, Tanjong Karang, Kuala Selangor, Klang, Kuala Lumpur, Banting	T-junctions
Perak	Manjung	Lekir			Lekir–Teluk Intan see also West Coast Expressway			
Perak	Perak Tengah	Lekir			Lekir–Teluk Intan see also West Coast Expressway			
Perak	Hilir Perak	Teluk Intan			Lekir–Teluk Intan see also West Coast Expressway			
Perak	Hilir Perak	Teluk Intan				Teluk Intan-WCE I/C	FT 58 Malaysia Federal Route 58 – Teluk Intan, Bidor; North–South Expressway Northern Route / AH2 – Bukit Kayu Hitam, Ipoh, Kuala Lumpur; West Coast Expressway – Sabak Bernam, Tanjong Karang, Kuala Selangor, Klang, Kuala Lumpur, Banting	Diamond interchange
Perak	Bagan Datuk	Jendarata				Jendarata		
Perak	Bagan Datuk	Hutan Melintang				Simpang Empat Hutan Melintang	FT 69 Malaysia Federal Route 69 – Bagan Datuk; A123 Jalan Hutan Melintang – Hutan Melintang	Junctions
Perak	Bagan Datuk	Hutan Melintang				Hutan Melintang Estate		
Perak	Bagan Datuk	Hutan Melintang				Kampung Tanjung Buloh		
Perak	Bagan Datuk	Hutan Melintang				Hutan Melintang I/C (WCE)	West Coast Expressway – Teluk Intan, Sitiawan, Taiping, George Town, Alor Setar; Jalan Sungai Samak – Kampung Sungai Samak	Diamond interchange
Perak	Bagan Datuk	Hutan Melintang				Kampung Teluk Kerdu		
Perak–Selangor border					Bernam River bridge			
Selangor	Sabak Bernam	Sabak				U-Turn	U-Turn – Sabak, Tanjong Karang, Kuala Selangor	U-turn
Selangor	Sabak Bernam	Sabak				Sabak	B53 Jalan Raja Chulan – Sabak town centre, Masjid Jamek Sultan Hishamuddin, Sabak Bernam Waterfront, Sabak Bernam Museum	Junctions
Selangor	Sabak Bernam	Sabak				Sabak	Jalan Hospital – Hospital Tengku Ampuan Jemaah	T-junctions
Selangor	Sabak Bernam	Sabak				Sabak	Jalan Menteri – Sabak town centre, Masjid Jamek Sultan Hishamuddin, Sabak Bernam Waterfront, Sabak Bernam Museum	Junctions
Selangor	Sabak Bernam	Sabak				Kampung Batu Tiga Puluh Sembilan		
Selangor	Sabak Bernam	Sungai Besar				Kampung Tebok Pulai	B55 Selangor State Route B55 – Bagan Nakhoda Omar, Sungai Ayer Tawar, Bagan Nakohda Omar Recreational Park (Bagan Nakhoda Omar Beach); Jalan Angkasa – Kampung Parit Enam	Junctions
Selangor	Sabak Bernam	Sungai Besar				Sungai Besar	Jalan Sungai Limau Dua; B51 Jalan Lembaga Padi Negara	Junctions
Selangor	Sabak Bernam	Sungai Besar				Jalan Sabak Bernam–Hulu Selangor	B44 Selangor State Route B44 – Sungai Panjang, Tanjung Malim; North–South Expressway Northern Route / AH2 – Bukit Kayu Hitam, Ipoh, Kuala Lumpur	T-junctions
Selangor	Sabak Bernam	Sungai Besar				Kampung Sungai Limau	B53 Jalan Lama Kuala Selangor	T-junctions
Selangor	Sabak Bernam	Sungai Besar				Kampung Simpang Lima	Jalan Sungai Haji Dorani – Kampung Sungai Haji Dorani	Junctions
Selangor	Sabak Bernam	Sungai Besar				Jalan Pasir Panjang	B110 Jalan Pasir Panjang	T-junctions
Selangor	Sabak Bernam	Sekinchan				Sungai Burong		
Selangor	Sabak Bernam	Sekinchan				Sekinchan		
Selangor	Sabak Bernam	Sekinchan				Kampung Pasir Panjang	B110 Jalan Pasir Panjang	T-junctions
Selangor	Kuala Selangor	Tanjong Karang				Kampung Parit Empat		
Selangor	Kuala Selangor	Tanjong Karang				Tanjong Karang	Tanjong Karang Bus Station	T-junctions
Selangor	Kuala Selangor	Tanjong Karang			Sungai Tengi Bridge			
Selangor	Kuala Selangor	Tanjong Karang				Tanjong Karang	Tanjong Karang Hospital	
Selangor	Kuala Selangor	Tanjong Karang				Jalan Tanjong Karang–Bestari Jaya	B42 Selangor State Route B42 – Bestari Jaya, University of Selangor (UNISEL)	T-junctions
Selangor	Kuala Selangor	Tanjong Karang				Kuala Selangor Fish Salt Stalls	Kuala Selangor Fish Salt Stalls	T-junctions
Selangor	Kuala Selangor	Tanjong Karang				Kampung Belimbing		
Selangor	Kuala Selangor	Tanjong Karang				Jalan Bukit Belimbing	B37 Jalan Bukit Belimbing – Bukit Belimbing	T-junctions
Selangor	Kuala Selangor	Tanjong Karang				Pasir Penambang		
Selangor	Kuala Selangor	Kuala Selangor			Selangor River Bridge; Sultan Salahuddin Abdul Aziz Shah Bridge			
Selangor	Kuala Selangor	Kuala Selangor				Kuala Selangor	Old town centre, Bukit Melawati	T-junctions
Selangor	Kuala Selangor	Kuala Selangor				Kuala Selangor	Kuala Selangor new town, Kuala Selangor District and Land Office, Sultan Ibrahim Mosque, Kuala Selangor Mangrove Forest Reserve; B33 Selangor State Route B33 – Bestari Jaya (Batang Berjuntai), Rawang, Universiti Industri Selangor (UNISEL), Kampung Kuantan fireflies	Junctions
Selangor	Kuala Selangor	Kuala Selangor				Lotus's Hypermarket Kuala Selangor		
Selangor	Kuala Selangor	Kuala Selangor				Kampung Baharu		
Selangor	Kuala Selangor	Kuala Selangor				Taman Rhu		
Selangor	Kuala Selangor	Kuala Selangor				Kampung Tengah		
Selangor	Kuala Selangor	Assam Jawa				Taman Raja Udang		
Selangor	Kuala Selangor	Assam Jawa				Assam Jawa	FT 54 Malaysia Federal Route 54 – Kuala Lumpur, Sungai Buloh, Ijok; Kuala Lumpur–Kuala Selangor Expressway – Kuantan, Rawang, Shah Alam, Kuala Lumpur International Airport, Kuala Lumpur, Sungai Buloh, Kundang, Bandar Tasik Puteri, Puncak Alam	T-junctions
Selangor	Kuala Selangor	Assam Jawa				Taman Selesa		
Selangor	Kuala Selangor	Assam Jawa				Api-Api		
Selangor	Kuala Selangor	Jeram				Kuala Sungai Buloh	Sungai Buloh Fish Market	T-junctions
Selangor	Kuala Selangor	Jeram			Sungai Buloh Bridge			
Selangor	Kuala Selangor	Jeram				Kuala Sungai Buloh	B104 Jalan Sasaran	T-junctions
Selangor	Kuala Selangor	Jeram				Rantau Panjang Beach		T-junctions
Selangor	Kuala Selangor	Jeram				Jeram	B107 Jalan Pantai Jeram; B104 Jalan Simpang 3 Jeram	Junctions
Selangor	Kuala Selangor	Jeram				Sungai Sembilang		
Selangor	Kuala Selangor	Jeram				Sungai Janggut		
Selangor	Klang	Kapar				Jalan Tok Muda	Jalan Tok Muda – Kampung Tok Muda, Sultan Salahuddin Abdul Aziz Power Station, TNB Staff Quarters	T-junctions
Selangor	Klang	Kapar				Jalan Sementa	Jalan Sementa – Kampung Sementa	T-junctions
Selangor	Klang	Kapar				Kapar		
Selangor	Klang	Kapar			Sungai Kapar bridge			
Selangor	Klang	Kapar				Kapar	FT 3217 Malaysia Federal Route 3217 – Meru, Setia Alam; West Coast Expressway – Alor Setar, George Town, Taiping, Beruas, Klang, Kuala Lumpur, Banting	T-junctions
Selangor	Klang	Kapar				TNB Staff Quarters		
Selangor	Klang	Kapar				Kampung Perepat		
Selangor	Klang	Kapar				Sementa	Jalan Sementa – Kampung Sementa	T-junctions
Selangor	Klang	Kapar				Taman Kapar Indah		
Selangor	Klang	Kapar				Jalan Haji Sirat	B4 Selangor State Route B4 – Meru	T-junctions
Selangor	Klang	Kapar				Kapar-NNKSB I/C	New North Klang Straits Bypass / AH141 – Shah Alam, Kuala Lumpur, Port Klang, Bandar Sultan Sulaiman, Tanjung Harapan	Parclo interchange
Selangor	Klang	Kapar				Kapar-NKSB	FT 20 North Klang Straits Bypass – Port Klang, Bandar Sultan Sulaiman, Tanjung Harapan, Shah Alam, Kuala Lumpur, Johor Bahru	Junctions
Selangor	Klang	Klang				Klang	see also FT 2 Jalan Jambatan Kota	
Selangor	Klang–Kuala Langat district border				Klang–Banting see also Klang–Banting Highway			
Selangor	Kuala Langat	Banting				Banting	B58 Selangor State Route B58 – Jugra, Permatang Pasir, Istana Bandar, Masjid Alaeddin, Sultan Abdul Samad Mausoleum	T-junctions
Selangor	Kuala Langat	Morib				Kampung Kanchong Darat	B123 Jalan Sungai Lang – Kampung Sungai Kelambu, National Space Centre (Angkasa)	Junctions
Selangor	Kuala Langat	Morib				Kampung Kanchong Darat	Sidek's Family Badminton Monument	
Selangor	Kuala Langat	Morib				Kampung Kanchong Darat		
Selangor	Kuala Langat	Morib				Jalan Kanchong	B121 Jalan Kanchong – Kanchong Laut, Tanjung Sepat; Jalan Kampung Tali Air – Kampung Tali Air	Junctions
Selangor	Kuala Langat	Morib				Simpang Jugra	B59 Jalan Kelanang – Bandar Jugra, Istana Bandar, Masjid Alaeddin, Sultan Abdul Samad Mausoleum	T-junctions
Selangor	Kuala Langat	Morib				Tongkah		
Selangor	Kuala Langat	Morib				Morib	Morib Beach V, Morib Landing Memorial	T-junctions
Selangor	Kuala Langat	Morib				Morib Golf and Country Club		
Selangor	Kuala Langat	Morib				Jalan Kampung Tali Air	Jalan Kampung Tali Air – Kampung Tali Air	T-junctions
Selangor	Kuala Langat	Morib				Kampung Kanchong Laut		
Selangor	Kuala Langat	Tanjung Sepat				Jalan Ibrahim Merican	B121 Jalan Ibrahim Merican – Kanchong Darat, Banting	T-junctions
Selangor	Kuala Langat	Tanjung Sepat				Jalan Kampung Batu Lapan	B323 Jalan Kampung Batu Lapan – Kampung Batu Lapan	T-junctions
Selangor	Kuala Langat	Tanjung Sepat				Kampung Darat Bali	B120 Jalan Kampung Darat Bali – Kampung Darat Bali	T-junctions
Selangor	Kuala Langat	Tanjung Sepat				Tanjung Sepat	B120 Jalan Kampung Darat Bali – Kampung Darat Bali	T-junctions
Selangor	Sepang	Sungai Pelek				Tanjung Tumbok Estate		
Selangor	Sepang	Sungai Pelek				Jalan Hulu Chuchoh	B119 Jalan Hulu Chuchoh – Kampung Hulu Chuchoh	T-junctions
Selangor	Sepang	Sungai Pelek				Jalan Bagan Lalang	Jalan Bagan Lalang – Bagan Lalang Beach	T-junctions
Selangor	Sepang	Sungai Pelek				Sungai Pelek		
Selangor	Sepang	Sepang				Jalan Hulu Chuchoh	B119 Jalan Hulu Chuchoh – Kampung Hulu Chuchoh	T-junctions
Selangor	Sepang	Sepang				Sepang	B48 Selangor State Route B48 – Dengkil, Salak Tinggi, Nilai, Kuala Lumpur International Airport (KLIA), Sepang F1 Circuit; North–South Expressway Central Link / AH2 – Kuala Lumpur, Johor Bahru; Old road – Town centre	Junctions
Selangor–Negeri Sembilan border					Sungai Sepang bridge			
Negeri Sembilan	Port Dickson	Lukut				Tanah Merah Estate		
Negeri Sembilan	Port Dickson	Lukut				Tanah Merah		
Negeri Sembilan	Port Dickson	Lukut				Jalan Kampung Chuah	N4 Jalan Kampung Chuah – Kampung Chuah, Kuala Lukut	T-junctions
Negeri Sembilan	Port Dickson	Lukut				Tanah Merah Estate		
Negeri Sembilan	Port Dickson	Lukut				Kampung Baharu Tanah Merah	N4 Jalan Kampung Chuah – Kampung Chuah, Kuala Lukut	T-junctions
Negeri Sembilan	Port Dickson	Lukut			Sungai Lukut Besar bridge			
Negeri Sembilan	Port Dickson	Lukut				Lukut Chinese Cemetery		
Negeri Sembilan	Port Dickson	Lukut				Jalan Seremban–Port Dickson	FT 53 Malaysia Federal Route 53 – Seremban, Mambau; Seremban–Port Dickson Highway – Seremban, Kuala Lumpur, Johor Bahru	T-junctions
Negeri Sembilan	Port Dickson	Lukut				Lukut	Lukut Health Clinic	
Negeri Sembilan	Port Dickson	Lukut				Lukut	Jalan Industri 1 – Taman Perindustrian Lukut	
Negeri Sembilan	Port Dickson	Lukut				Lukut	Selangor Royal Mausoleum (Makam Raja Jumaat)	
Negeri Sembilan	Port Dickson	Lukut				Lukut	Kota Lukut, Muzium Lukut,	T-junctions
Negeri Sembilan	Port Dickson	Lukut				Jalan Kampung Kuala Lukut	N159 Jalan Kampung Kuala Lukut – Kampung Kuala Lukut	Junctions
Negeri Sembilan	Port Dickson	Lukut			Sungai Lukut Kechil Bridge			
Negeri Sembilan	Port Dickson	Port Dickson				Sime Darby's Port Dickson Power Plant		
Negeri Sembilan	Port Dickson	Port Dickson				Port Dickson (North)	FT 53 Jalan Seremban – Town Centre, Tuanku Jaafar Power Station	Junctions
Negeri Sembilan	Port Dickson	Port Dickson				Port Dickson North–Port Dickson South	see also Port Dickson Bypass	concur
Negeri Sembilan	Port Dickson	Port Dickson				Port Dickson (South)	Jalan Dato' Haji Abdul Samad (Jalan Pantai) – Town Centre, PD Waterfront City; Jalan Shell – Shell Oil Refinery	Junctions
Negeri Sembilan	Port Dickson	Port Dickson				Jalan Esso	Jalan Esso – Esso Oil Refinery	T-junctions
Negeri Sembilan	Port Dickson	Port Dickson				Corus Beach Resort	Corus Beach Resort, Paradise Lagoon Apartment	
Negeri Sembilan	Port Dickson	Port Dickson				Bagan Pinang	Beaches	
Negeri Sembilan	Port Dickson	Port Dickson				Hotel Seri Malaysia		
Negeri Sembilan	Port Dickson	Port Dickson				Si Rusa	Beaches	
Negeri Sembilan	Port Dickson	Port Dickson			Sungai Si Rusa bridge			
Negeri Sembilan	Port Dickson	Port Dickson				Jalan Sungai Menyala	N8 Negeri Sembilan State Route N8 – Rantau; Seremban–Port Dickson Highway – Seremban, Kuala Lumpur, Johor Bahru; Port Dickson, Bandar Tentera Darat (The Army Town) – Malaysian Army Parade Ground, Port Dickson Army Camp, Malaysian Army Museum, Malaysian Army Cemetery	T-junctions
Negeri Sembilan	Port Dickson	Port Dickson				Port Dickson Army Camp		
Negeri Sembilan	Port Dickson	Port Dickson				Royal Port Dickson Yacht Club		
Negeri Sembilan	Port Dickson	Port Dickson			Si Rusa RSA			
Negeri Sembilan	Port Dickson	Port Dickson				Selesa Beach Resort		
Negeri Sembilan	Port Dickson	Port Dickson				Port Dickson Army Camp		
Negeri Sembilan	Port Dickson	Port Dickson				Marina Bay Port Dickson		
Negeri Sembilan	Port Dickson	Port Dickson				Perdana Condo Resort		
Negeri Sembilan	Port Dickson	Port Dickson				Port Dickson Golf and Country Club		
Negeri Sembilan	Port Dickson	Port Dickson				Port Dickson Hospital	Port Dickson Hospital	
Negeri Sembilan	Port Dickson	Port Dickson				Bandar Baru Sunggala	Bandar Baru Sunggala	T-junctions
Negeri Sembilan	Port Dickson	Port Dickson				Port Dickson Nursing College	Port Dickson Nursing College	
Negeri Sembilan	Port Dickson	Teluk Kemang				Sunggala Roundabout	FT 219 Malaysia Federal Route 219 – Sua Betong; Seremban–Port Dickson Highway – Seremban, Kuala Lumpur, Johor Bahru	Roundabout
Negeri Sembilan	Port Dickson	Teluk Kemang				Teluk Kemang; Bandar Baru Teluk Kemang	Bandar Baru Teluk Kemang	T-junctions
Negeri Sembilan	Port Dickson	Teluk Kemang				Teluk Kemang		
Negeri Sembilan	Port Dickson	Teluk Kemang				Taman Politeknik	Jalan Politeknik 10 – Taman Politeknik, Politeknik Port Dickson; FT 363 Malaysia Federal Route 363 – Sua Betong; Seremban–Port Dickson Highway – Seremban, Kuala Lumpur, Johor Bahru	T-junctions
Negeri Sembilan	Port Dickson	Teluk Kemang				Malaysian Army College	Malaysian Army College), Malaysian Peacekeeping Training Centre (MPTC)	T-junctions
Negeri Sembilan	Port Dickson	Teluk Kemang				Jalan Tanjung Tuan	N167 Negeri Sembilan State Route N167 – Pantai Cermin, Tanjung Biru, Pusat Latihan Rejimen Artileri Diraja (Royal Artillery Regiment Training Centre); Tanjung Tuan (Malacca) (Cape Rachado) – Tanjung Tuan Forest Recreational Area, Tanjung Tuan Lighthouse	T-junctions
Negeri Sembilan	Port Dickson	Teluk Kemang				Royal Armour Regiment Training Centre	Royal Armour Regiment Training Centre, Port Dickson Methodist Centre (PDMC)	T-junctions
Negeri Sembilan	Port Dickson	Teluk Kemang				Port Dickson	MES Greysands PDRM (Royal Malaysian Police), Kompleks Peranginan Bank Negara Malaysia (Bank Negara Resort), Brunwell / Anexxe, Bunga Raya and Seri Mesra, EPF (KWSP) Bunglow	T-junctions
Negeri Sembilan	Port Dickson	Teluk Pelanduk				Negeri Sembilan State Rest House	Negeri Sembilan State Rest House	
Negeri Sembilan	Port Dickson	Teluk Pelanduk				Kampung Tanjung Pelanduk	Rumah Rakyat Teluk Pelanduk	
Negeri Sembilan	Port Dickson	Teluk Pelanduk				Kampung Baru Teluk Pelanduk		
Negeri Sembilan	Port Dickson	Teluk Pelanduk				Jalan Baru Teluk Pelanduk	FT 365 Jalan Baru Teluk Pelanduk – Taman Politeknik, Politeknik Port Dickson; Seremban–Port Dickson Highway – Seremban, Kuala Lumpur, Johor Bahru	T-junctions
Negeri Sembilan	Port Dickson	Teluk Pelanduk			Sungai Menyala bridge			
Negeri Sembilan	Port Dickson	Teluk Pelanduk				Primaland Port Dickson Resort and Convention Centre		
Negeri Sembilan	Port Dickson	Teluk Pelanduk				Royal Palm Springs Resort	Persiaran Palm Springs – Royal Palm Springs Resort	T-junctions
Negeri Sembilan	Port Dickson	Teluk Pelanduk				Sunggala–Pasir Panjang Road	FT 363 Malaysia Federal Route 363 – Sua Betong, Eagle Ranch Resort; Seremban–Port Dickson Highway – Seremban, Kuala Lumpur, Johor Bahru	T-junctions
Negeri Sembilan	Port Dickson	Pasir Panjang				Pasir Panjang		
Negeri Sembilan	Port Dickson	Pasir Panjang				Kampung Sungai Raya	FT 138 Malaysia Federal Route 138 – Kuala Sungai Baru, Malacca, Akademi Laut Malaysia (ALAM)	T-junctions
Negeri Sembilan	Port Dickson	Pasir Panjang				Pengkalan Kempas Historical Complex (Fort Kempas)	Pengkalan Kempas Historical Complex (Fort Kempas), Batu Bersurat Pengkalan Kempas (Pengkalan Kempas Inscription Stone), Makam Ulama Sheikh Ahmad Makhtum (Tomb)	Historical site T-junctions
Negeri Sembilan	Port Dickson	Pasir Panjang				Pengkalan Kempas		
Negeri Sembilan	Port Dickson	Linggi			Linggi River Bridge			
Negeri Sembilan	Port Dickson	Linggi				Linggi	N7 Negeri Sembilan State Route N7 – Ayer Kuning, Rantau, Seremban	T-junctions
Negeri Sembilan	Port Dickson	Linggi				Jalan Pedas–Linggi	N9 Negeri Sembilan State Route N9 – Rembau, Pedas; North–South Expressway Southern Route – Seremban, Kuala Lumpur, Johor Bahru	T-junctions
Negeri Sembilan	Rembau	Kampung Semin				Kampung Pengkalan Durian		
Negeri Sembilan	Rembau	Kampung Semin				Jalan Lubuk Kuali	N116 Jalan Lubuk Kuali – Lubuk Kuali, Kampung Sungai Timun	T-junctions
Negeri Sembilan	Rembau	Kampung Semin				Kampung Semin	N12 Jalan Kota – Kota, Rembau	T-junctions
Negeri Sembilan	Rembau	Kampung Semin				Jalan Titian Akar	N103 Jalan Titian Akar – Kampung Titian Akar	T-junctions
Negeri Sembilan–Malacca border					Sungai Rembau bridge			
Malacca	Alor Gajah	Lubuk China				Lubuk China	M131 Jalan Lubuk China – Titian Bitangor, Brisu	Roundabout
Malacca	Alor Gajah	Lubuk China				Lubuk China		
Malacca	Alor Gajah	Lubuk China				Kampung Pengkalan Paoh	M10 Malacca State Route M10 – Brisu, Simpang Ampat, Alor Gajah, Tampin, Gemas, Segamat; North–South Expressway Southern Route / AH2 – Kuala Lumpur, Johor Bahru	Roundabout
Malacca	Alor Gajah	Lubuk China				Kampung Teluk Berembang		
Malacca	Alor Gajah	Lubuk China				Ramuan China Kechil	M161 Jalan Ramuan China–Kuala Sungai Baru – Kuala Sungai Baru; M10 Malacca State Route M10 – Brisu, Simpang Ampat, Alor Gajah, Tampin, Gemas, Segamat	Junctions
Malacca	Alor Gajah	Lubuk China				Ramuan China Besar		
Malacca	Alor Gajah	Lubuk China				Kampung Jeram	FT 138 Malaysia Federal Route 138 – Kuala Sungai Baru, Port Dickson. Malacca Islamic University (UNIMEL), Akademi Laut Malaysia (ALAM)	T-junctions
Malacca	Alor Gajah	Masjid Tanah				Taman Tamby Chik Karim		
Malacca	Alor Gajah	Masjid Tanah				Kampung Tengah		
Malacca	Alor Gajah	Masjid Tanah				Masjid Tanah	FT 139 Malaysia Federal Route 139 – Lendu, Alor Gajah; North–South Expressway Southern Route / AH2 – Kuala Lumpur, Johor Bahru	T-junctions
Malacca	Alor Gajah	Masjid Tanah				Masjid Tanah; Jalan Londang	M157 Malacca State Route M157 – Pengkalan Balak, Tanjung Bidara, Malacca Matriculation College (KMM)	T-junctions
Malacca	Alor Gajah	Masjid Tanah				Masjid Tanah	M155 Jalan Kampung Ayer Limau – Brisu, Lubuk China	T-junctions
Malacca	Alor Gajah	Masjid Tanah				Masjid Tanah		
Malacca	Alor Gajah	Masjid Tanah				Kampung Solok Duku		
Malacca	Alor Gajah	Masjid Tanah			Sungai Solok Duku bridge			
Malacca	Alor Gajah	Masjid Tanah				Jalan Padang Kambing	Jalan Padang Kambing – Padang Kambing, Pengkalan Balak, Tanjung Bidara	T-junctions
Malacca	Alor Gajah	Masjid Tanah				Kampung Solok Duku		
Malacca	Alor Gajah	Masjid Tanah				Taman Masjid Tanah		
Malacca	Alor Gajah	Sungai Udang				Sungai Udang Army Camp		
Malacca	Alor Gajah	Sungai Udang				Sungai Udang Army Training Forest Ground		
Malacca	Alor Gajah	Sungai Udang				Sungai Udang Combat Training Facilities		
Malacca	Alor Gajah	Sungai Udang			Sungai Udang Forest Recreational Area			
Malacca	Alor Gajah	Sungai Udang				RELA Corps Training Academy		
Malacca	Alor Gajah	Sungai Udang				SPA Highway	FT 33 SPA Highway – Paya Rumput, Alor Gajah, Ayer Keroh; North–South Expressway Southern Route / AH2 – Kuala Lumpur, Johor Bahru	T-junctions
Malacca	Melaka Tengah	Sungai Udang				Sungai Udang	Jalan Kem Terendak – Terendak Army Camp	T-junctions
Malacca	Melaka Tengah	Sungai Udang				Petronas Oil Refinery		
Malacca	Melaka Tengah	Tangga Batu				Jalan Pantai Kundor	FT 140 Malaysia Federal Route 140 – Pantai Kundor, Pantai Dusun, Pantai Puteri	T-junctions
Malacca	Melaka Tengah	Tangga Batu				Tangga Batu	FT 140 Malaysia Federal Route 140 – Bukit Rambai, Batu Berendam, Alor Gajah	T-junctions
Malacca	Melaka Tengah	Tangga Batu				Tanjung Kling	FT 141 Malaysia Federal Route 141 – Pelabuhan Beruas, Tanjung Kling Power Station, Pantai Kundor, Pantai Dusun, Pantai Puteri, Hang Tuah's Mausoleum	T-junctions
Malacca	Melaka Tengah	Tangga Batu				Jalan Bukit Rambai	M9 Jalan Bukit Rambai – Bukit Rambai	T-junctions
Malacca	Melaka Tengah	Tangga Batu				Kampung Balang Tiga	M7 Jalan Pulau Gadong – Pulau Gadong, Alor Gajah, Batu Berendam	T-junctions
Malacca	Melaka Tengah	Klebang				Jalan Pokok Mangga	M5 Jalan Pokok Mangga – Pokok Mangga	T-junctions
Malacca	Melaka Tengah	Klebang			Klebang Beach			
Malacca	Melaka Tengah	Klebang				Klebang	M3 Malacca State Route M3 – Alor Gajah, Batu Berendam	T-junctions
Malacca	Melaka Tengah	Klebang				Jalan Syed Abdul Aziz	FT 192 Malaysia Federal Route 192 – Melaka Raya, Padang Temu, Muar, Historical Places of Malacca (UNESCO World Heritage Sites)	T-junctions
Malacca	Melaka Tengah	Malacca City				Kampung Tengkera	Tranquerah Mosque	
Malacca	Melaka Tengah	Malacca City				Kota Laksamana		
Malacca	Melaka Tengah	Malacca City				Malacca City		
Malacca	Melaka Tengah	Malacca City				Malacca City	Jonker Walk	
Malacca	Melaka Tengah	Malacca City				Malacca City; Semabok	Jalan Ayer Leleh – Bukit Serindit; Lorong Bukit Senjuang – Banda Hilir, St John's Fort, Historical Places of Malacca (UNESCO World Heritage Sites)	Junctions
Malacca	Melaka Tengah	Malacca City				Malacca City–Duyung	see also FT 19 AMJ Highway	
Malacca	Melaka Tengah	Duyung				Duyung	FT 19 AMJ Highway – Jasin, Muar, Batu Pahat	T-junctions
Malacca	Melaka Tengah	Duyung			Sungai Duyung Bridge			
Malacca	Melaka Tengah	Duyung				Kandang	FT 144 Malaysia Federal Route 144 – Ayer Molek, Bemban, Jasin	T-junctions
Malacca	Melaka Tengah	Telok Mas				Kampung Alai		
Malacca	Melaka Tengah	Telok Mas				Jalan Padang Temu	M100 Malacca State Route M100 – Padang Temu, Bandar Hilir, Malacca City Centre, Portuguese Square, Historical Places of Malacca (UNESCO World Heritage Sites)	T-junctions
Malacca	Melaka Tengah	Telok Mas			Sungai Punggur Bridge			
Malacca	Melaka Tengah	Telok Mas				Sempang Bugis	M103 Jalan Sempang Bugis – Kampung Sempang Bugis, Kampung Bukit Batu, Kampung Balik Bukit	T-junctions
Malacca	Melaka Tengah	Telok Mas			Telok Mas L/B – Craft stalls			
Malacca	Melaka Tengah	Telok Mas				SMK(A) Sharifah Rodziah	Sekolah Menengah Kebangsaan (Agama) Sharifah Rodziah	
Malacca	Melaka Tengah	Telok Mas				Taman Emas	Jalan Emas – Taman Emas	T-junctions
Malacca	Melaka Tengah	Telok Mas				Kampung Telok Mas	M103 Jalan Sempang Bugis – Kampung Sempang Bugis, Kampung Bukit Batu, Kampung Balik Bukit	T-junctions
Malacca	Melaka Tengah	Telok Mas				Kampung Telok Mas		
Malacca	Melaka Tengah	Telok Mas				Telok Mas	Taman Telok Mas, Henry Gurney School	Junctions
Malacca	Melaka Tengah	Telok Mas				Pernu		
Malacca	Melaka Tengah	Telok Mas				Medan Ikan Bakar Umbai		T-junctions
Malacca	Melaka Tengah–Jasin district border				Sungai Umbai bridge			
Malacca	Jasin	Umbai				Umbai	M105 Jalan Paya Dalam – Paya Dalam, Tiang Dua	T-junctions
Malacca	Jasin	Umbai				Umbai Ferry Terminal; Medan Ikan Bakar Umbai		T-junctions
Malacca	Jasin	Umbai				Masjid Umbai	Masjid Umbai, Makam (Mausoleum) Sultan Ali of Johor	Historical site
Malacca	Jasin	Serkam				Jalan Serkam Pantai	M108 Jalan Serkam Pantai – Serkam Pantai, Serkam Ferry Terminal (Ferry to Pulau Besar)	T-junctions
Malacca	Jasin	Serkam				Jalan Pulai Pantai	M169 Jalan Pulai Pantai – Pulai Pantai	T-junctions
Malacca	Jasin	Serkam				Jalan Bemban	M109 Malacca State Route M109 – Tiang Dua, Bemban, Jasin	T-junctions
Malacca	Jasin	Serkam				Serkam	M109 Malacca State Route M109 – Tiang Dua, Bemban, Jasin; M108 Malacca State Route M108 – Serkam Pantai, Medan Ikan Bakar Serkam	Junctions
Malacca	Jasin	Serkam				Tedong		
Malacca	Jasin	Serkam				Sempang	M111 Jalan Sempang Pantai – Sempang Pantai	T-junctions
Malacca	Jasin	Merlimau				Merlimau Industrial Area		T-junctions
Malacca	Jasin	Merlimau				Merlimau	M14 Malacca State Route M14 – Merlimau Darat	T-junctions
Malacca	Jasin	Merlimau				Merlimau Rest House		
Malacca	Jasin	Merlimau				Taman Merlimau Jaya		
Malacca	Jasin	Merlimau			Sungai Merlimau Bridge			
Malacca	Jasin	Merlimau				Merlimau	M25 Malacca State Route M25 – Jasin, Rim; North–South Expressway Southern Route / AH2 – Kuala Lumpur, Johor Bahru	T-junctions
Malacca	Jasin	Merlimau				Jalan Serkam Pantai	M108 Malacca State Route M108 – Serkam Pantai, Solok Pantai, Penghulu Nattar's House	T-junctions
Malacca	Jasin	Merlimau				Jalan Pahlawan	M113 Jalan Pahlawan – Merlimau Pasir	T-junctions
Malacca	Jasin	Merlimau				Kampung Ayer Tawar	M115 Jalan Merlimau Pasir – Merlimau Pasir, Batu Gajah	T-junctions
Malacca	Jasin	Merlimau				Sebatu	M117 Malacca State Route M117 – Pekan Pasir, Permatang Tulang	Junctions
Malacca	Jasin	Sungai Rambai				Jalan Permatang Tulang	M117 Malacca State Route M117 – Permatang Tulang	T-junctions
Malacca	Jasin	Sungai Rambai				Malacca Barter Trade Port	Malacca Barter Trade Port	T-junctions
Malacca	Jasin	Sungai Rambai				Parit Putat	M19 Jalan Parit Putat – Parit Putat	T-junctions
Malacca	Jasin	Sungai Rambai				Sungai Rambai	M14 Malacca State Route M14 – Parit Perawas	T-junctions
Malacca	Jasin	Sungai Rambai			Kesang Recreational Area (Malacca side)			
Malacca–Johor border					Kesang River bridge			
Johor	Tangkak	Kesang			Kesang Recreational Area (Johor side)			
Johor	Tangkak	Kesang				Kesang	FT 19 AMJ Highway – Jasin, Malacca City, Alor Gajah	T-junctions
Johor	Tangkak	Kesang				Kesang–Parit Bunga	see also FT 19 AMJ Highway	
Johor	Tangkak	Parit Bunga				Parit Bunga; SMK Parit Bunga	Sekolah Menengah Kebangsaan Parit Bunga	
Johor	Tangkak	Tanjung Agas				Jalan Kesang Laut	J134 Jalan Kesang Laut – Kesang Laut	T-junctions
Johor	Tangkak	Tanjung Agas			Tanjung Agas RSA (Muar bound)			
Johor	Tangkak	Tanjung Agas			Parit Haji Osman bridge			
Johor	Tangkak	Tanjung Agas				SMS Muar	Jalan Tiong Batu – Kampung Kenangan Tun Syed Nasir, Sekolah Menengah Sains Muar (SMS Muar)	Junctions
Johor	Tangkak	Tanjung Agas				Tanjung Agas Muslim Cemetery		
Johor	Tangkak	Tanjung Agas				KIP Mart		
Johor	Tangkak	Tanjung Agas				Tanjung Agas	Jalan Seri Tanjung Indah 1 – Kampung Kenangan Tanjung Agas; Jalan Perindustrian – Tanjung Agas Industrial Area	Junctions
Johor	Tangkak	Tanjung Agas			Tanjung Agas RSA (Malacca bound)			
Johor	Tangkak	Tanjung Agas				ST Microelectronics factory	ST Microelectronics factory (formerly known as STS Thompson)	T-junctions
Johor	Tangkak	Tanjung Agas				Tanjung Agas Industrial Area	Tanjung Agas Industrial Area, Bandar Baru Tanjung Agas, NSK Hypermarket Muar	Muar bound
Johor	Tangkak	Tanjung Agas			Parit Keliling Sungai Muar bridge			
Johor	Tangkak	Tanjung Agas				Sultan Ismail Mosque	Masjid Sultan Ismail, Muar (Muar Second Mosque)	
Johor	Tangkak–Muar district border				Sungai Muar bridge Jambatan Sultan Ismail; Length: 385 m			
Johor	Muar	Muar			Bandar Maharani Gateway Arch			
Johor	Muar	Muar				Muar; Jalan Maharani-Jalan Salleh	J24 Johor State Route J24 – Labis, Pagoh, Bukit Pasir; North–South Expressway Southern Route / AH2 – Kuala Lumpur, Johor Bahru	Junctions
Johor	Muar	Muar				Muar; Jalan Abdullah	Jalan Abdullah – Town Centre, Tanjung Emas, Rest House, Bangunan Sultan Abu Bakar, Istana Tanjung, Masjid Jamek Sultan Ibrahim	Junctions
Johor	Muar	Muar				Muar; Bentayan Roundabout	FT 24 Malaysia Federal Route 24 – Bakri, Parit Sulong, Yong Peng	Roundabout
Johor	Muar	Muar				Muar; Jubli Intan Roundabout	Jalan Ibrahim – Tanjung Emas, Rest House, Memorial Tun Dr Ismail; Jalan Sulaiman – Town Centre, Bangunan Sultan Abu Bakar, Istana Tanjung, Masjid Jamek Sultan Ibrahim, Malaysian Public Works Department (JKR) Muar district Headquarters; J31 Johor State Route J31 – Parit Jawa, Parit Bakar	Roundabout
Johor	Muar	Muar				Muar; Khalidi Roundabout	Jalan Abdul Rahman – Tanjung Emas, Rest House, Memorial Tun Dr Ismail; Jalan Khalidi – Jalan Joned	Roundabout
Johor	Muar	Muar				Parit Haji Baki	Jalan Sultan Ibrahim – Jalan Temenggong Ahmad, Stadium Sultan Ibrahim, Taxi and Bus Terminal; Jalan Parit Haji Baki – Jalan Joned	Junctions
Johor	Muar	Muar			Bandar Maharani Gateway Arch			
Johor	Muar	Parit Sakai				Parit Sakai	FT 224 Muar Bypass (Muar Second Bridge) – Malacca, Tangkak, Segamat, Pagoh; North–South Expressway Southern Route / AH2 – Kuala Lumpur, Johor Bahru	T-junctions
Johor	Muar	Parit Sakai				Parit Raja		
Johor	Muar	Parit Bakar				Parit Bakar	J132 Johor State Route J132 – Parit Bakar Darat	T-junctions
Johor	Muar	Parit Bakar				Parit Ahmad	J59 Johor State Route J59 – Parit Ahmad Laut	T-junctions
Johor	Muar	Parit Bakar				Parit Unas Chinese Temple		
Johor	Muar	Parit Bakar				Parit Unas		
Johor	Muar	Parit Jawa				Parit Keliling Parit Jawa	Kampung Parit Jawa Laut, Medan Asam Pedas Parit Jawa (Fish hot sour stalls)	Corner T-junctions
Johor	Muar	Parit Jawa				Parit Jawa	J131 Jalan Bukit Mor – Bukit Mor, Bakri, Parit Sulong, Yong Peng; J31 Johor State Route J31 – Parit Bakar	Junctions
Johor	Muar	Parit Jawa				Parit Jamil	J27 Jalan Parit Jamil – Kampung Parit Jamil	T-junctions
Johor	Muar	Parit Jawa				Parit Pechah		
Johor	Muar	Parit Jawa				Parit Bulat		
Johor	Muar	Parit Jawa				Kampung Seri Menanti		
Johor	Muar	Parit Jawa				Sungai Gerisek	J142 Jalan Sungai Gerisek – Kampung Sungai Gerisek, Gerisek Hot Springs; Jalan Tanjung Tohor – Tanjung Tohor	Junctions
Johor	Muar	Sungai Balang				Sungai Sudah		
Johor	Muar	Sungai Balang				Sungai Balang		
Johor	Muar	Sungai Balang				Pekan Baru Parit Yusuf	FT 85 Malaysia Federal Route 85 – Parit Sulong, Pagoh, Yong Peng; North–South Expressway Southern Route / AH2 – Kuala Lumpur, Johor Bahru	T-junctions
Johor	Muar	Sungai Balang			Sungai Sarang Buaya Bridge			
Johor	Muar	Sungai Balang			Sungai Sarang Buaya Recreational Area			
Johor	Muar	Semerah				Semerah		
Johor	Batu Pahat	Semerah				Semerah		
Johor	Batu Pahat	Semerah				Jalan Sungai Nibong	J203 Jalan Sungai Nibong – Kampung Sungai Nibong	T-junctions
Johor	Batu Pahat	Semerah				Simpang Lima	J19 Johor State Route J19 – Parit Sulong, Pagoh, Yong Peng; North–South Expressway Southern Route / AH2 – Kuala Lumpur, Johor Bahru	T-junctions
Johor	Batu Pahat	Batu Pahat				Peserai		
Johor	Batu Pahat	Batu Pahat				The Southern Hospital		South side
Johor	Batu Pahat	Batu Pahat			Parit Keliling Sungai Batu Pahat Bridge			
Johor	Batu Pahat	Batu Pahat			Batu Pahat R/R – Nasi Briyani Mat Shah Batu Pahat (North side)			
Johor	Batu Pahat	Batu Pahat			Sungai Batu Pahat Bridge			
Johor	Batu Pahat	Batu Pahat				Batu Pahat; The Summit Batu Pahat	J13 Johor State Route J13 – Tongkang Pechah, Parit Sulong, Yong Peng; North–South Expressway Southern Route / AH2 – Kuala Lumpur, Johor Bahru	Junctions
Johor	Batu Pahat	Batu Pahat				Batu Pahat; Mount Soga	FT 50 Malaysia Federal Route 50 – Parit Raja, Ayer Hitam, Kluang, Mersing; North–South Expressway Southern Route / AH2 – Kuala Lumpur, Johor Bahru	T-junctions
Johor	Batu Pahat	Batu Pahat				Batu Pahat; Banang Roundabout	J17 Jalan Minyak Beku – Kampung Minyak Beku; Batu Pahat District and Land Office	Roundabout
Johor	Batu Pahat	Batu Pahat				Banang Golf and Country Resort		
Johor	Batu Pahat	Senggarang				Jalan Sungai Suloh	J124 Jalan Sungai Suloh – Kampung Minyak Beku	T-junctions
Johor	Batu Pahat	Senggarang				Kampung Asrakal		
Johor	Batu Pahat	Senggarang				Jalan Bukit Kelicap	J207 Jalan Bukit Kelicap	T-junctions
Johor	Batu Pahat	Senggarang				Taman Kelicap		
Johor	Batu Pahat	Senggarang				Jalan Bukit Kelicap	J207 Jalan Bukit Kelicap	T-junctions
Johor	Batu Pahat	Senggarang				Koris		
Johor	Batu Pahat	Senggarang				Senggarang	J127 Jalan Bukit Batu	T-junctions
Johor	Batu Pahat	Senggarang				Taman Senggarang		
Johor	Batu Pahat	Senggarang				Jalan Parit Kemang	J122 Jalan Parit Kemang – Parit Botak	T-junctions
Johor	Batu Pahat	Senggarang				Parit Botak; Kampung Ceruk	J9 Johor State Route J9 – Parit Botak, Parit Hamid, Parit Raja, Ayer Hitam, Kluang; North–South Expressway Southern Route / AH2 – Kuala Lumpur, Johor Bahru	T-junctions
Johor	Batu Pahat	Rengit			Sungai Rengit Bridge			
Johor	Batu Pahat	Rengit				Rengit	J120 Jalan Jaya Diri – FELDA Ulu Rengit	T-junctions
Johor	Batu Pahat	Rengit				Kampung Sungai Kluang		
Johor	Batu Pahat	Rengit				Kampung Sungai Bagan		
Johor	Batu Pahat	Rengit				Kampung Sungai Merlong	Kampung Tengah	
Johor	Batu Pahat	Rengit				Kampung Parit Belahan Tampok		
Johor	Batu Pahat	Rengit				Tampok	J117 Jalan Parit Betak – Parit Betak; Jalan Tampok Laut – Tampok Laut	Junctions
Johor	Pontian	Benut			Sungai Benut Bridge			
Johor	Pontian	Benut				Benut	Jalan Jaafar – Benut town centre, Jetty to Pulau Pisang; FT 96 Malaysia Federal Route 96 – Simpang Renggam; North–South Expressway Southern Route / AH2 – Kuala Lumpur, Johor Bahru	Junctions
Johor	Pontian	Benut			Sungai Pinggan Bridge			
Johor	Pontian	Benut				Kampung Parit Marjunit		
Johor	Pontian	Benut				Sanglang		
Johor	Pontian	Benut			Sungai Sanglang Bridge			
Johor	Pontian	Ayer Baloi				Jelutong	Kampung Parit Jelutong Laut	
Johor	Pontian	Ayer Baloi				Kampung Parit Panjang		
Johor	Pontian	Ayer Baloi				Ayer Baloi	J107 Johor State Route J107 – FELDA Bukit Batu, Sedenak; North–South Expressway Southern Route / AH2 – Kuala Lumpur, Johor Bahru	T-junctions
Johor	Pontian	Ayer Baloi			Sungai Ayer Baloi Bridge			
Johor	Pontian	Ayer Baloi				Kampung Jawa		
Johor	Pontian	Ayer Baloi				Kampung Api-Api		
Johor	Pontian	Ayer Baloi				Jalan Parit Sikom	J115 Jalan Parit Sikom – Kampung Kayu Ara Pasong	T-junctions
Johor	Pontian	Pontian Kechil			Sungai Pontian Besar Bridge			
Johor	Pontian	Pontian Kechil				Pontian Municipal Council		
Johor	Pontian	Pontian Kechil				Pontian Besar	Jalan Ismail – Pontian District and Land Office, Pontian Esplanade; J112 Jalan Wan Hussein	Junctions
Johor	Pontian	Pontian Kechil			Sungai Pontian Kechil Bridge			
Johor	Pontian	Pontian Kechil				Pontian Kechil	FT 95 Malaysia Federal Route 95 – Kukup, Tanjung Piai, Kukup Golf Resort	Junctions
Johor	Pontian	Pontian Kechil				Pontian–Skudai	see also Skudai–Pontian Highway	
1.000 mi = 1.609 km; 1.000 km = 0.621 mi: Concurrency terminus

== See also ==
- West Coast Expressway – an controlled-access expressway that runs in parallel with the Federal Route 5
- Malaysia Federal Route 3 – the east coastal counterpart of the Federal Route 5
