= Jalan Abdullah (Muar) =

Road in Malaysia

Major junctions
- Northeast end: Jalan Hashim junctions
- Jalan Hashim; FT 5 Jalan Bakri; Jalan Sulaiman; Jalan Othman; Jalan Majidi
- Southwest end: Jalan Othman junctions

Location
- Country: Malaysia

Highway system
- Highways in Malaysia; Expressways; Federal; State

Jalan Abdullah (Jawi: جالن عبدالله) is a major road in Bandar Maharani Muar, Johor, Malaysia. It was named after Dato Abdullah bin Jaafar, the State Commissioner from 1906 to 1912 and Dato' Menteri Besar (Chief Minister) of Johor from 1926.

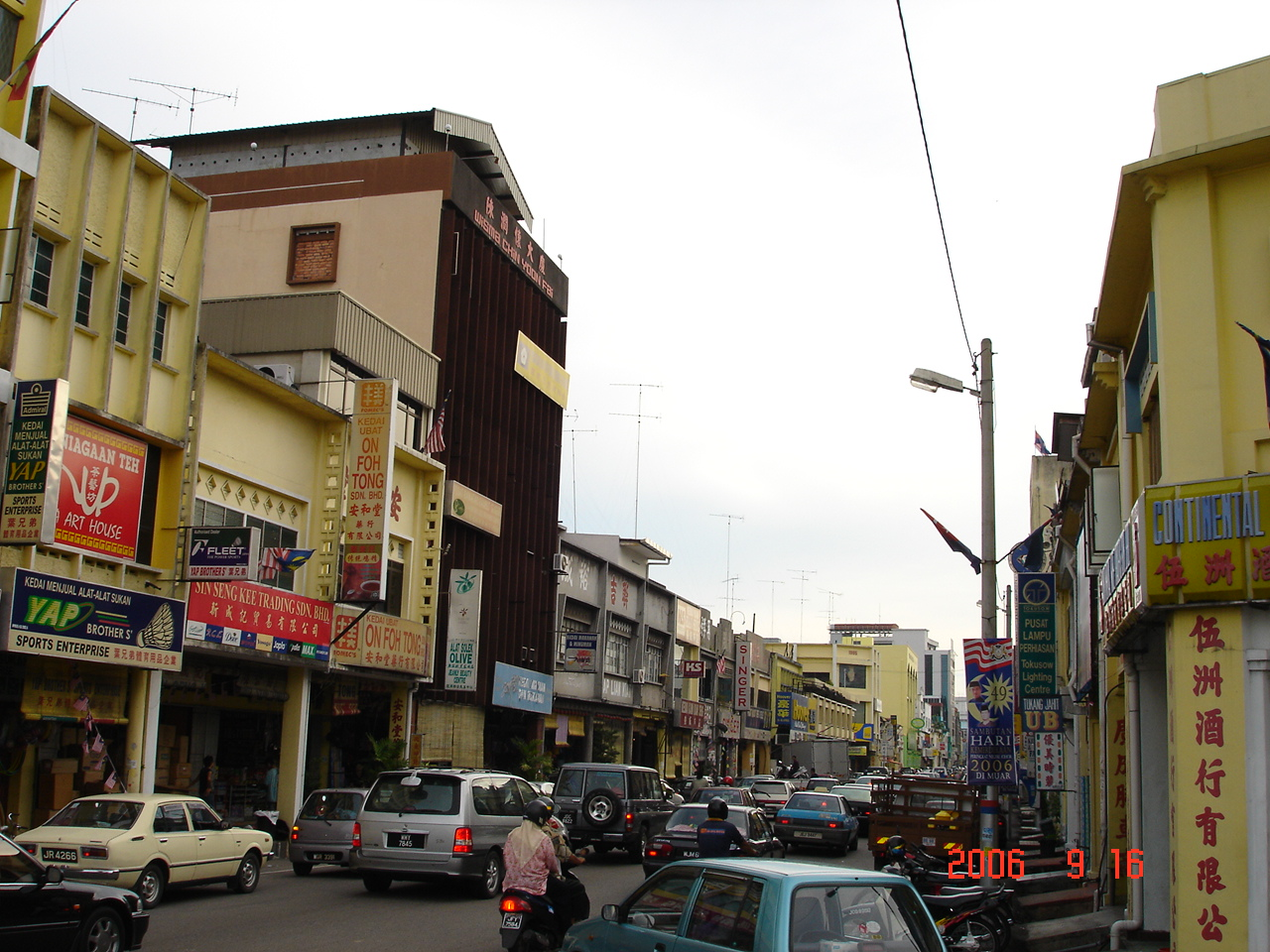
Jalan Abdullah street view in Muar

== Attractions ==
=== Landmarks ===
- Padang Nyiru and Muar Clock Tower
- Fung Seng Bakery
- Arked Muar

=== Maharani Uptown ===
Located at Jalan Sisi.

== List of junctions along the road ==
km	Exit	Junctions	To	Remarks
		Jalan Hashim	Jalan Hashim	No entry From Jalan Hashim only
جالن عبدالله; Jalan Abdullah
		Jalan Bentayan	Southeast; Jalan Bentayan; FT 24 Yong Peng; FT 24 Parit Sulong; FT 5 Batu Pahat	Junctions
		Sungai Bentayan bridge		
		SJKC Chung Hwa 2A & 2B		
		Leong Hup headquarters		
		Padang Nyiru	Northwest; FT 5 Jalan Bakri; Sultan Ismail Bridge; FT 5 Melaka; FT 23 Tangkak; FT 23 Segamat; North–South Expressway Southern Route AH2 North–South Expressway Southern Route; Kuala Lumpur Southeast; FT 24 Yong Peng; FT 24 Parit Sulong; FT 5 Batu Pahat U-turn; J24 Jalan Salleh; J32 Labis; J32 Bukit Kepong; J32 Pagoh; North–South Expressway Southern Route AH2 North–South Expressway Southern Route; Johor Bahru; Hospital Pakar Sultanah Fatimah	Junctions
		Padang Nyiru; Muar Clock Tower		
		Jalan Yahya	Jalan Yahya	Junctions
		Jalan Haji Abu	Northwest; Jalan Haji Abu; Jalan Maharani	Junctions
		Jalan Sayang	Southeast; Jalan Sayang; Jalan Meriam; Jalan Ali; FT 5 Jalan Arab	Junctions
		Jalan Sisi	Jalan Sisi; Maharani Walk	Junctions
		Arked Muar		
جالن عبدالله; Jalan Abdullah
		Jalan Sulaiman	Southeast; Jalan Sulaiman; J31 Parit Jawa; J31 Parit Bakar; FT 5 Batu Pahat; Dewan Jubli Intan	Junctions
جالن مجيدي; Jalan Majidi
		Jalan Othman	Jalan Othman; Northwest; Jalan Maharani; Jalan Petrie; Muar Trade Centre; Bangunan Sultan Abu Bakar; Istana Tanjung; Masjid Jamek Sultan Ibrahim; Dataran Tanjung Emas Southeast; Jalan Ibrahim; Jalan Khalidi	Junctions
		Parit Othman bridge		
			Southwest; Jalan Majidi; J59 Jalan Joned; Tanjung Emas; Rest House; Memorial Tun Dr Ismail	
