= Muar State Railway =

Former railway operator in Malaya

Muar State Railway Keretapi Kerajaan Muar كريتاڤي كراجأن موار
- Muar State Railway (MSR) train locomotive

Overview
- Status: Ceased operation
- Locale: Johor, Malaya (now Malaysia).
- Termini: Bandar Maharani (town), (Muar), Johor.; Parit Pulai, Johor.
- Stations: 5 permanent stations and 8 temporary stations.

Service
- Type: Passenger and freight light rail
- Services: 1
- Operator(s): Muar district government
- Rolling stock: >3 steam locomotive; unknown number of railroad cars.

History
- Opened: 1890
- Closed: 1929

Technical
- Number of tracks: 1
- Track gauge: 1,000 mm (3 ft 3 3/8 in)

The Muar State Railway (MSR) (Malay: Keretapi Kerajaan Muar; Jawi: كريتاڤي كراجأن موار) was a railroad operating in the district of Muar in Johor, Malaya (now Malaysia). Significantly, the MSR was the second railway line to operate in Johor after the short-lived Johore Wooden Railway (JWR), and began operation in 1890, five years after the opening of Perak Railway's Taiping-Port Weld line. In comparison to the JWR, the MSR was more successful commercially, operating for 39 years before facing closure under stiff competition coupled with rising operation costs.

== Rationale ==
The district of Muar enjoyed significant economic growth during the late 19th century as a result of a boom in the agricultural industry around the newly formed town of Bandar Maharani (also known as Muar town). As a result, Muar was economically important in Johor.

The need for a railway arose when Parit Jawa, an area under Muar south of Bandar Maharani, required safe passage for the transportation of crops such as gambiers, coconuts and Pinangs. As Parit Jawa was inaccessible to Bandar Maharani via land, transport of goods would have to be conducted by river and sea, which were exposed to pirate attacks.

On 13 November 1887, a discussion was held between Resident Tungku Sulaiman and the head for the Land Office and Agriculture Affairs of Muar district, Dato' Bentara Luar, which concluded with an agreement to construct a railway line between Bandar Maharani and Parit Jawa for dual uses: To transport passengers between the two localities, and to improve transportation of goods.

== Construction and extensions ==
Early construction work on the Muar State Railway line were conducted mostly by Malay and Javanese workers, the latter having migrated in masses to the Malay Peninsula, with low pay and no permanent jobs. Construction of the MSR commenced early 1889 with materials entirely supplied from Europe, the line from Jalan Sulaiman (Sulaiman Road) in Bandar Maharani to Parit Jawa completed in 1890. In 1894, the line was extended another 3 miles (4.8 km) to Sungai Pulai.

By 1915, the profitability of the MSR motivated the Sultan of Johor to suggest an extension of railway services up to the Batu Pahat river, but never materialised due to financial factors and geographical conditions.

== Stations ==
The Muar State Railway included a total of 13 stations, of which 5 were permanent and 8 were temporary.

Permanent stations:

1. Bandar Maharani (Muar town)
2. Parit Bakar
3. Parit Jawa
4. Parit Pecah
5. Parit Pulai

Temporary stations:

1. Parit Perupok
2. Parit Keroma
3. Parit Raja
4. Parit Unas
5. Parit Samsu
6. Parit Jamil
7. Parit Bulat
8. Parit Seri Menanti

== Rolling stock ==
In its first years of operation, the Muar State Railway was estimated to own 3 steam locomotives: On 28 January 1889, as construction of the railroad was underway, the first two locomotives were ordered from Black, Hawthorn & Co bearing works numbers 962 and 963; the third Black, Hawthorn & Co locomotive bearing works number 1017 was ordered later on 5 July 1890. During World War I, new locomotives from the United States were procured.

The trainsets of the MSR were originally planned for mixed use, consisting of an engine, 5 passenger coaches with outward facing seats (divided into first class, second class and third class), three goods vans and two further vans. This gave each trainset the ability to transport both freights and passengers, which partially contributed to the MSR's initial success.

The fare for passengers was five cents per mile. As agreed in 1887, free transportation was to be given to school children who went to Bandar Maharani's English school.

== Operation and decline ==
The Muar State Railway was financially successful due largely to high demand. In 1915, income for the MSR reached $ 86,701.92 compared to an expenditure of $63,216.77.

Numerous factors were attributed to the increase in demand. As the MSR was operational during its early years, the growth of economic activities in Muar, coupled with a cessation of sea transport, fueled demands for MSR's train services. In addition, the MSR's decision to utilise train sets accommodating both freights and passengers helped improve frequency of services and maximised each locomotive's potential. By the time the MSR was extended to Sungai Pulai in 1894, the MSR train ran five times a day.

The MSR suffered several technical difficulties throughout its service. In its later years, it became known soft ground under the line left parts of the MSR line vulnerable to collapse, resulting in the need to pile the ground each time a train passed through the areas and contributing to the line's increasing expenditure.

By the 1920s, profitability of the MSR declined as the MSR's rolling stock were aging while maintenance costs on the railway and stations were increasing. The MSR also faced competition from newly introduced road transport: Jalan Abdul Rahman, currently Jalan Temenggong Ahmad, a road between Bandar Maharani and Parit Jawa, opened in 1925 and rendered the MSR redundant. Lagging behind road-based vehicles, the MSR finally ceased operation in 1929.

== Legacy ==
The Muar State Railway was the last state-run railway to operate in Johor. By 1915, other state run railway operators such as Perak Railway and Selangor Railway have consolidated to form the Federated Malay States Railways (FMSR), which went on to extend its existing lines in Perak and Selangor to the north, south and east in Malaya. Under an agreement with the FMSR, the Johor state government participated in the development of the FMSR line by forming Johore Railway (JR), which undertook the construction of the Johor segment of the mainline from its boundary with Negeri Sembilan to Johor Bahru, before allowing itself to be absorbed into the FMSR in 1912. While Johor received FMSR train services upon completion of the line in 1909, the FMSR line bypassed all urban centres in Muar, leaving the MSR line unconnected to the wider FMSR network. Following the absorption of JR into the FMSR, the MSR remained in service for an additional 17 years before its closure.

Little remains of the MSR line and stations. Following its closure, most of the railway system were demolished or paved over. While the fate of the MSR's rolling stock is largely unknown; only one MSR locomotive of unknown specification serves as a permanent display in a park in Muar town. Close inspection reveals this to be a crude fabrication using steel sheeting mounted on concrete stands, the only genuine parts being some wheels and couplings, put together as a children's toy.

To date, Muar today has no railway service; the closest station is in Segamat. A stop in Muar was planned for the Kuala Lumpur-Singapore high speed railway before its eventual cancellation in 2021.

== See also ==
- Johore Wooden Railway
- Rail transport in Malaysia
