= Sultan Yusuf Bridge =

Bridge in Hilir Perak, Perak, Malaysia

Sungai Perak Bridge Jambatan Sultan Yusuf
- Coordinates: 3°58′05″N 100°58′26″E
- Carries: Motor vehicles
- Crosses: Perak River
- Locale: Part of West Coast Expressway (formerly Federal Route 5 Jalan Teluk Intan-Lumut, Batak Rabit)
- Official name: Sultan Yusuf Bridge
- Maintained by: Konsortium Lebuhraya Pantai Barat; Malaysian Public Works Department (JKR) Hilir Perak; Belati Wangsa Sdn Bhd

Characteristics
- Design: box girder
- Total length: 1,300 m
- Width: --
- Longest span: --
- No. of lanes: Double carriageway with 2 lanes each

History
- Designer: Government of Malaysia; Malaysian Public Works Department (JKR)
- Constructed by: Malaysian Public Works Department (JKR)
- Opened: 17 November 1988

Part of West Coast Expressway and Federal Route 5
- Sultan Yusuf Bridge

Route information
- Maintained by Konsortium Lebuhraya Pantai Barat; Malaysian Public Works Department (JKR) Hilir Perak; Belati Wangsa Sdn Bhd

Location
- Country: Malaysia

Highway system
- Highways in Malaysia; Expressways; Federal; State

The Sultan Yusuf Bridge (Malay: Jambatan Sultan Yusuf) on Perak River is the main bridge in Hilir Perak District, Perak, Malaysia. It is located on West Coast Expressway and Federal Route 5, crossing the river between Batak Rabit and Kota Setia. It is the third longest river bridge in Malaysia and was named after the 32nd Sultan of Perak, Almarhum Sultan Yusuf Izzuddin Shah Ghafarulahu-Lah.

== History ==
=== Early Construction ===
The Sultan Yusuf Bridge was one of the components of the missing link of the Federal Route 5 from Teluk Intan to Sitiawan, which was constructed as one of the infrastructure project under the Fifth Malaysia Plan. Before the bridge was built, villagers from the opposite of the Perak River Kampung such as Telok Selandang and Kampung Lekir had to use a river ferry service operated by a nearby oil palm estate. Construction of the Sultan Yusuf Bridge began in April 1986 with the total cost of RM27 million for the entire road project. The bridge was completed in 1988 and was opened to motorists on 17 November 1988, resulting in the full completion of the FT5 highway.

=== Expanding Bridge ===
In 2011, the West Coast Expressway was initiated with some of the expressway route taking over some of Federal Route 5, including this bridge. The bridge was expanded to a dual carriageway road with 2 lanes going each direction (total 4 lanes) to cater the expanding traffic. The new carriageway was constructed with the same design.

== Features ==
=== Batak Rabit Restaurant and Rest Plaza ===
Near the bridge is the Batak Rabit Restaurant and Rest Plaza. It was opened in 1990. Facilities are available here such as parking area, toilets, food courts, surau and playground. As of now, it is only accessible from Federal Route 5 and 58 towards Ipoh and Lumut due to the West Coast Expressway.

== See also ==
- Malaysia Federal Route 5
- West Coast Expressway
- Teluk Intan
