= J59 =

J59 may refer to:

- County Route J59 (California)
- HMS Peterhead (J59), a minesweeper of the Royal Navy
- Jalan Joned, Johor State Route J59, in Malaysia
- Parabiaugmented dodecahedron
