= Johor State Route J132 =

Road in Malaysia

Johor Route 132
- Jalan Parit Bakar

Route information
- Length: 5.00 km (3.11 mi)

Major junctions
- Southwest end: Parit Bakar Laut
- FT 5 Federal Route 5 J31 State Route J31; J140 State Route J140; J133 State Route J133
- Northeast end: Parit Bakar Darat

Location
- Country: Malaysia
- Primary destinations: Parit Bakar

Highway system
- Highways in Malaysia; Expressways; Federal; State

Johor State Route J132, Jalan Parit Bakar is a major road in Johor, Malaysia.

== Junction lists ==
The entire route is located in Muar District, Johor.

Legend:

- I/C - Interchange, I/S - Intersection, RSA - Rest and service area, OBR - Overhead bridge restaurant, R/R - Restaurant and rest plaza, L/B - Layby, V/P - Vista point, TN - tunnel, T/P - Toll plaza, BR - Bridge
- C - Cloverleaf, S - Stack, T-A - Trumpet-A, T-B - Trumpet-B, DT - Directional-T/Y, SDT - Semi-Directional-T/Y, P-Y - Partial-Y, D - Diamond, P-C - Partial cloverleaf, D-D - Diverging diamond, D-R - Direct ramp

Location	km	mi	Name	Destinations	Notes
Parit Bakar	0.0	0.0	Parit Bakar Laut	FT 5 Malaysia Federal Route 5 – Muar, Malacca, Parit Jawa, Batu Pahat, Johor Bahru	T-junctions
Parit Bakar			Parit Bakar	J31 Johor State Route J31 – Muar, Parit Jawa	Junctions
Parit Bakar			Jalan Dato' Haji Kosai	J140 Jalan Dato' Haji Kosai – Muar, Bakri	T-junctions
Parit Bakar			Parit Bakar Darat	J133 Johor State Route J133 – Muar, Bakri, Parit Jawa	Junctions
1.000 mi = 1.609 km; 1.000 km = 0.621 mi
