= Negeri Sembilan State Route N9 =

Road in Malaysia

Negeri Sembilan Route 9
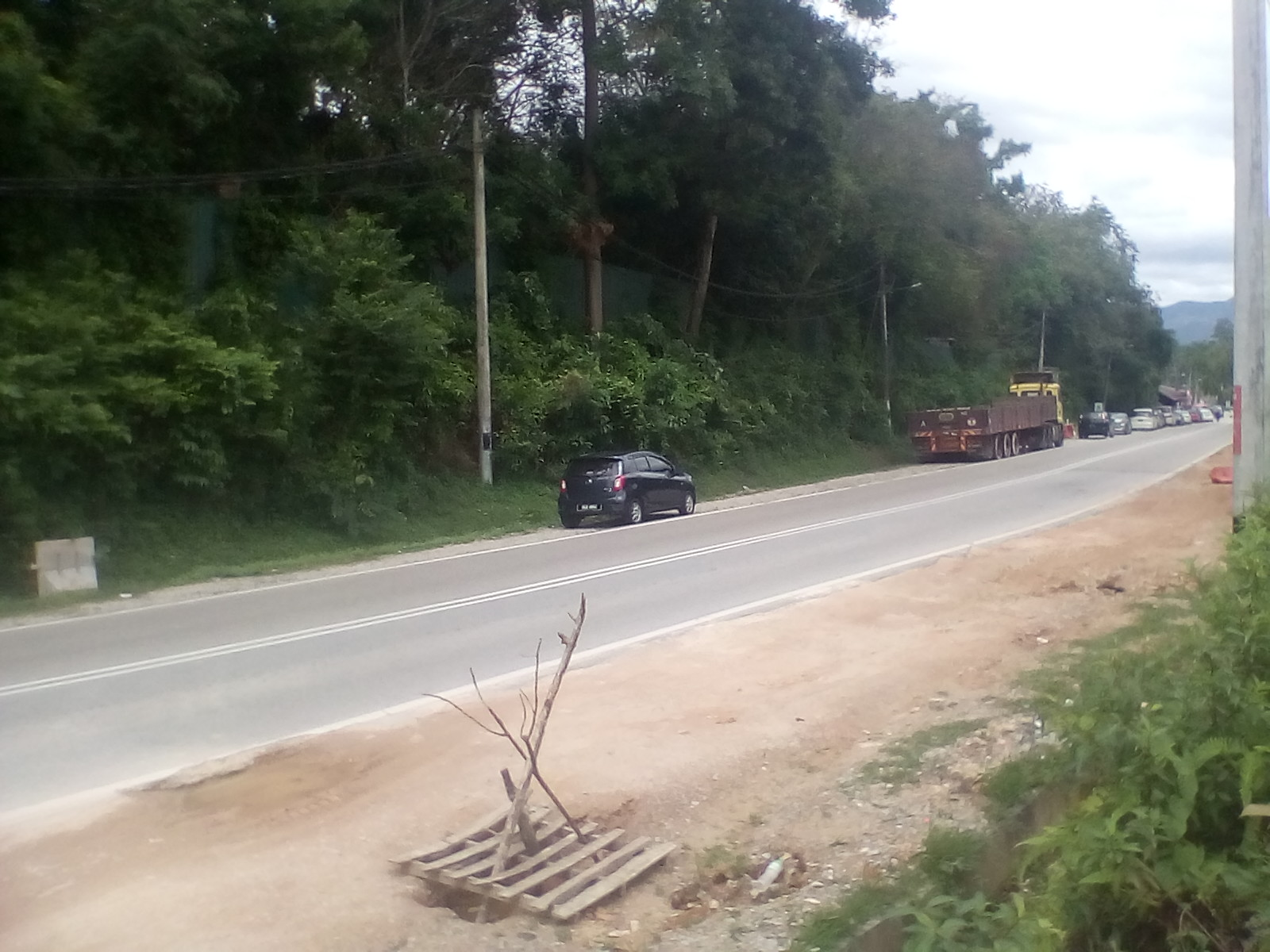

Major junctions
- North end: Pedas
- FT 1 Federal Route 1 North–South Expressway Southern Route / AH2; FT 5 Federal Route 5
- South end: Linggi

Location
- Country: Malaysia
- Primary destinations: Rembau, Rantau, Seremban, Port Dickson

Highway system
- Highways in Malaysia; Expressways; Federal; State

Negeri Sembilan State Route N9, Jalan Pedas–Linggi is a major road in Negeri Sembilan, Malaysia. It is also a main route to North–South Expressway Southern Route via Pedas/Linggi Interchange.

== Junction lists ==
The entire route is located in Negeri Sembilan.

Legend:

- I/C - Interchange, I/S - Intersection, RSA - Rest and service area, OBR - Overhead bridge restaurant, R/R - Restaurant and rest plaza, L/B - Layby, V/P - Vista point, TN - tunnel, T/P - Toll plaza, BR - Bridge
- C - Cloverleaf, S - Stack, T-A - Trumpet-A, T-B - Trumpet-B, DT - Directional-T/Y, SDT - Semi-Directional-T/Y, P-Y - Partial-Y, D - Diamond, P-C - Partial cloverleaf, D-D - Diverging diamond, D-R - Direct ramp

District	Location	km	mi	Name	Destinations	Notes
Rembau	Pedas			Pedas	FT 1 Malaysia Federal Route 1 – Seremban, Senawang, Rembau, Tampin	T-junctions
Rembau	Pedas			Kampung Sungai Batu		
Rembau	Pedas			Kampung Pedas Tengah		
Rembau	Pedas			Kampung Pedas Gedang	N102 Jalan Rantau–Pedas – Rantau, Silau, Rembau	Roundabout
Rembau	Pedas			Kampung Pedas Hilir		
Rembau	Pedas			Kampung Serdang	Kampung Minching	
Rembau	Pedas			Kampung Merbau Sembilan	Kampung Merbau Sembilan	T-junctions
Rembau	Pedas			Pedas/Linggi-NSE	North–South Expressway Southern Route / AH2 – Kuala Lumpur, Seremban, Senawang, Alor Gajah, Malacca, Johor Bahru	T-junctions
Rembau	Kundur			Kampung Solok Ayer Murai		
Rembau	Kundur			Kampung Solok Ayer Kuning	Kampung Kundur Hulu	T-junctions
Rembau	Kundur			Kampung Dato' Abdul Samad		
Rembau	Kundur			Kampung Kundur Hulu		
Rembau	Kundur			Sungai Kundur bridge		
Rembau	Kundur			Kampung Kundur Tengah		
Rembau	Kundur			Jalan Kundur	N33 Jalan Kundur – Kampung Paya Lebar	T-junctions
Rembau	Kundur			Kampung Kundur Hilir	N114 Jalan Kundur Hilir – Kampung Kundur Hilir	T-junctions
Rembau	Kundur			KKTM Rembau	Kolej Kemahiran Tinggi MARA (KKTM) Rembau	
Port Dickson	Linggi			Linggi	FT 5 Malaysia Federal Route 5 – Port Dickson, Rantau, Linggi, Lubuk China, Alor Gajah, Malacca	T-junctions
1.000 mi = 1.609 km; 1.000 km = 0.621 mi
