= Sultan Salahuddin Abdul Aziz Shah Bridge =

Sungai Selangor Bridge Jambatan Sultan Salahuddin Abdul Aziz Shah
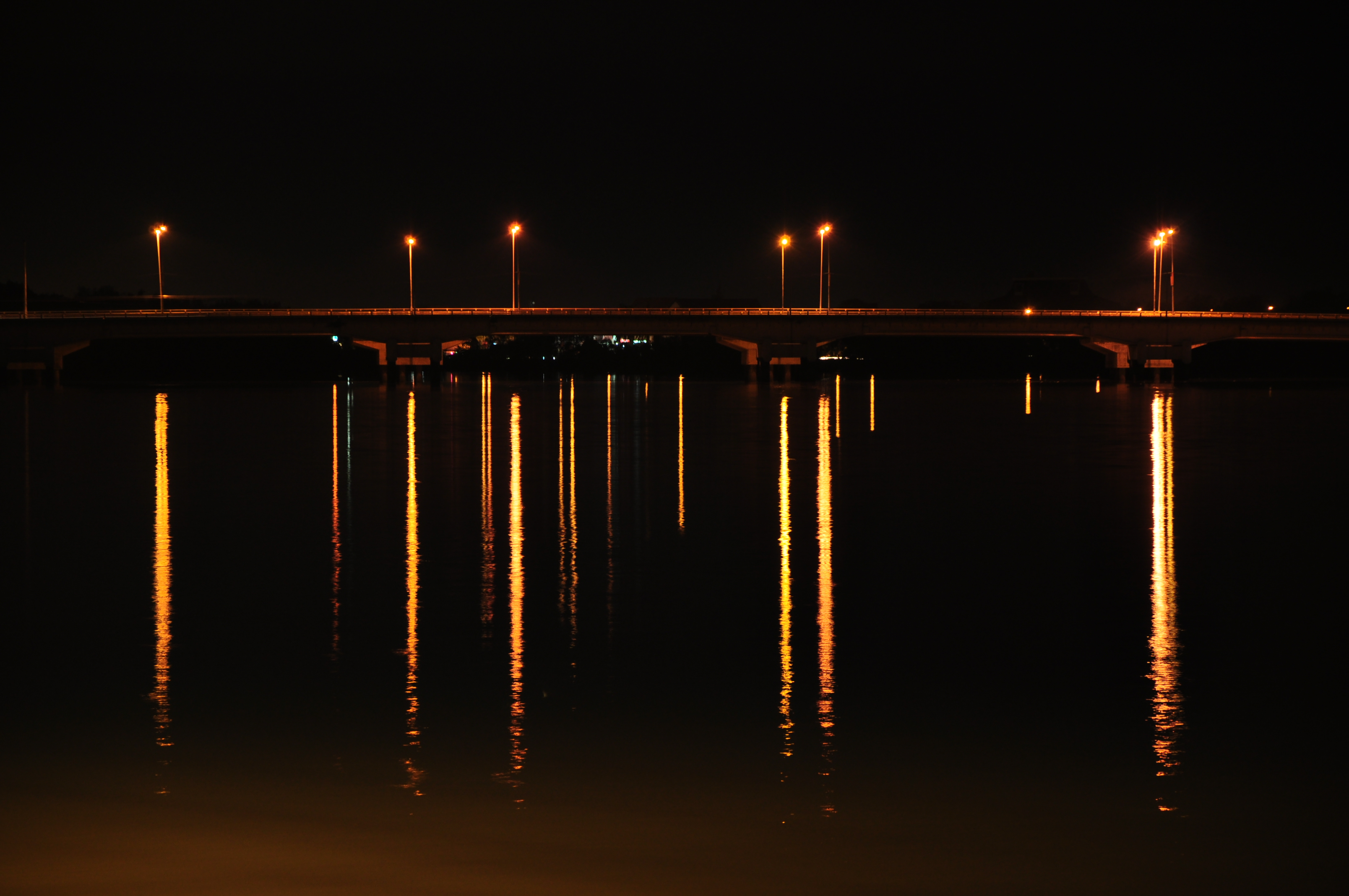
- Coordinates: 3°20′28″N 101°15′11″E
- Carries: Motor vehicles, Pedestrians
- Crosses: Selangor River
- Locale: Federal Route 5 Jalan Kuala Selangor-Sabak Bernam
- Official name: Sultan Salahuddin Abdul Aziz Shah Bridge
- Maintained by: Malaysian Public Works Department (JKR) Kuala Selangor; Roadcare Sdn Bhd; Majlis Daerah Kuala Selangor (MDKS)

Characteristics
- Design: box girder
- Total length: --
- Width: --
- Longest span: --

History
- Designer: Government of Malaysia; Malaysian Public Works Department (JKR)
- Constructed by: Malaysian Public Works Department (JKR)
- Opened: 1979

Location
- Interactive map of Sungai Selangor Bridge

The Sultan Salahuddin Abdul Aziz Shah Bridge (Malay: Jambatan Sultan Salahuddin Abdul Aziz Shah) is a main bridge in Kuala Selangor District, Selangor, Malaysia crossing Selangor River.

== History ==
Before the bridge was built, the people who wanted to cross (call for the Pasir Penambang and Tanjung Karang) had crossed the Selangor river using the ferry facility called Penambang.

In 1970, the Kuala Selangor Bridge FT5 was proposed. However, the project sparked a controversy due to delays caused by the failure of the original contractor to complete the job. As a result, a new tender was opened in 1976 to get a new contractor to complete the abandoned Kuala Selangor Bridge construction job. The Kuala Selangor Bridge FT5, together with the Sabak Bernam Bridge FT5, were completed in 1980.

The bridge was officially opened on 24 April 1979 by the late Almarhum Sultan Salahuddin Abdul Aziz Shah of Selangor and was named as Sultan Salahuddin Abdul Aziz Shah Bridge. Originally, the bridge was a two-lane bridge before being upgraded to 4-lane dual-carriageway bridge.

== See also ==
- Malaysia Federal Route 5
