= Johor State Route J112 =

Road in Malaysia

Johor Route 112
- Jalan Parit Semerah

Major junctions
- West end: Pontian Besar
- FT 5 Federal Route 5 J116 Jalan Parit Selangor; J229 Jalan Parit Basilam
- East end: Parit Selangor

Location
- Country: Malaysia
- Primary destinations: Taman Saujana

Highway system
- Highways in Malaysia; Expressways; Federal; State

Jalan Parit Semerah (Johor State Route 112) is a major road in Pontian District, Johor, Malaysia. It connects Pontian Besar until Parit Selangor.

== Junction lists ==
The entire route is located in Pontian District, Johor.

Location	km	mi	Destinations	Notes
Pontian Besar			FT 5 Malaysia Federal Route 5 – Malacca, Muar, Batu Pahat, Rengit, Benut, Ayer Baloi, Pontian Kechil; North–South Expressway Southern Route / AH2 – Kuala Lumpur, Malacca, Johor Bahru, Singapore	T-junctions
Parit Selangor			J116 Jalan Parit Selangor – Kampung Parit Kassim, Pekan Nanas, Ulu Choh, Pulai, Skudai, Pasir Gudang, Johor Bahru Second Link Expressway / AH143 – Kuala Lumpur, Malacca, Johor Bahru, Singapore; J229 Jalan Parit Basilam – Parit Haji Adnan	Junctions
1.000 mi = 1.609 km; 1.000 km = 0.621 mi
