= Johor State Route J31 =

Road in Malaysia

Johor Route 31
- Jalan Temenggong Ahmad (Jalan Parit Jawa)

Route information
- Length: 12.7 km (7.9 mi)
- Existed: 1925–present
- History: Built on the former site of the Muar State Railway (MSR) service until 1925.

Major junctions
- Northwest end: Muar (Bandar Maharani); Bulatan Jubli Intan
- FT 5 Federal Route 5 FT 224 Muar Bypass; J132 State Route J132; J131 State Route J131
- Southeast end: Parit Jawa

Location
- Country: Malaysia
- Primary destinations: Parit Bakar

Highway system
- Highways in Malaysia; Expressways; Federal; State

Johor State Route J31 (Jawi: جالن تمڠݢوڠ احمد) is a major road in Johor, Malaysia. The road was built on the former site of the Muar State Railway (MSR) service until 1925. The road is very straight without any bends. There are many parit (canals) along this road.

At most sections, the State Route J31 was built under the JKR R3 road standard, allowing maximum speed limit of up to 60 km/h (37 mph).

== Junction lists ==
The entire route is located in Muar District, Johor.

Legend:

- I/C - Interchange, I/S - Intersection, RSA - Rest and service area, OBR - Overhead bridge restaurant, R/R - Restaurant and rest plaza, L/B - Layby, V/P - Vista point, TN - tunnel, T/P - Toll plaza, BR - Bridge
- C - Cloverleaf, S - Stack, T-A - Trumpet-A, T-B - Trumpet-B, DT - Directional-T/Y, SDT - Semi-Directional-T/Y, P-Y - Partial-Y, D - Diamond, P-C - Partial cloverleaf, D-D - Diverging diamond, D-R - Direct ramp

Location	km	mi	Name	Destinations	Notes
Muar	0.0	0.0	Muar; Jubli Intan Roundabout (Gerbang Mahkota Roundabout)	Jalan Sulaiman – Town centre, Bangunan Sultan Abu Bakar, Istana Tanjung, Masjid Jamek Sultan Ibrahim, Malaysian Public Works Department (JKR) Muar district Headquarters; Jalan Ibrahim – Tanjung Emas, Rest House; FT 5 Malaysia Federal Route 5 (Jalan Khalidi/Jalan Arab) – Batu Pahat, Johor Bahru, Parit Sulong, Yong Peng, Pagoh, Labis, Malacca, Tangkak, Segamat; North–South Expressway Southern Route / AH2 – Kuala Lumpur, Johor Bahru	Roundabout
Muar			Jalan Daud	Jalan Daud	T-junctions
Muar			Jalan Sultan Ibrahim	Jalan Sultan Ibrahim – Muar District Stadium, Bus and taxi terminal, Jalan Parit Haji Baki, Jalan Joned	T-junctions
Muar			TNB Muar	TNB Muar district branch office	
Muar			Kampung Dato' Bentara Luar		
Muar			Jalan Tunku Bendahara	Jalan Tunku Bendahara – Jalan Haji Jaib, Sungai Abong	T-junctions
Muar			Parit Perupok		
Muar			Bandar Maharani Gateway Arch		
Muar			Muar Bypass	FT 224 Muar Bypass – Parit Sulong, Yong Peng, Pagoh, Labis, Malacca, Tangkak, Segamat, Batu Pahat, Johor Bahru; North–South Expressway Southern Route / AH2 – Kuala Lumpur, Johor Bahru	Junctions
Parit Sakai			Parit Sakai		
Parit Sakai			Parit Keroma		
Parit Sakai			Parit Besar		
Parit Sakai			Parit Raja		
Parit Sakai			Parit Amal		
Parit Bakar			Parit Bakar	J132 Johor State Route J132 – Parit Bakar Laut, Parit Bakar Darat, Jalan Dato' Haji Kosai	Junctions
Parit Bakar			Puspakom Muar	Puspakom Muar	T-junctions
Parit Jawa			Parit Ahmad		
Parit Jawa			Parit Payong		
Parit Jawa			Parit Unas		
Parit Jawa			Parit Haji Ali		
Parit Jawa			Parit Punggor		
Parit Jawa			Parit Pinang Seribu		
Parit Jawa			Parit Samsu		
Parit Jawa			Parit Limbong		
Parit Jawa			Parit Kassim		
Parit Jawa			Parit Seri		
Parit Jawa			Parit Lapis		
Parit Jawa			Parit Jawa	J131 Jalan Bukit Mor – Bukit Mor, Bakri, Parit Sulong, Yong Peng; FT 5 Malaysia Federal Route 5 – Batu Pahat, Johor Bahru, Muar, Malacca, Medan Asam Pedas Parit Jawa	Junctions
1.000 mi = 1.609 km; 1.000 km = 0.621 mi
