= Assam Jawa =

Coordinates: 3.2998207°N 101.2766609°E

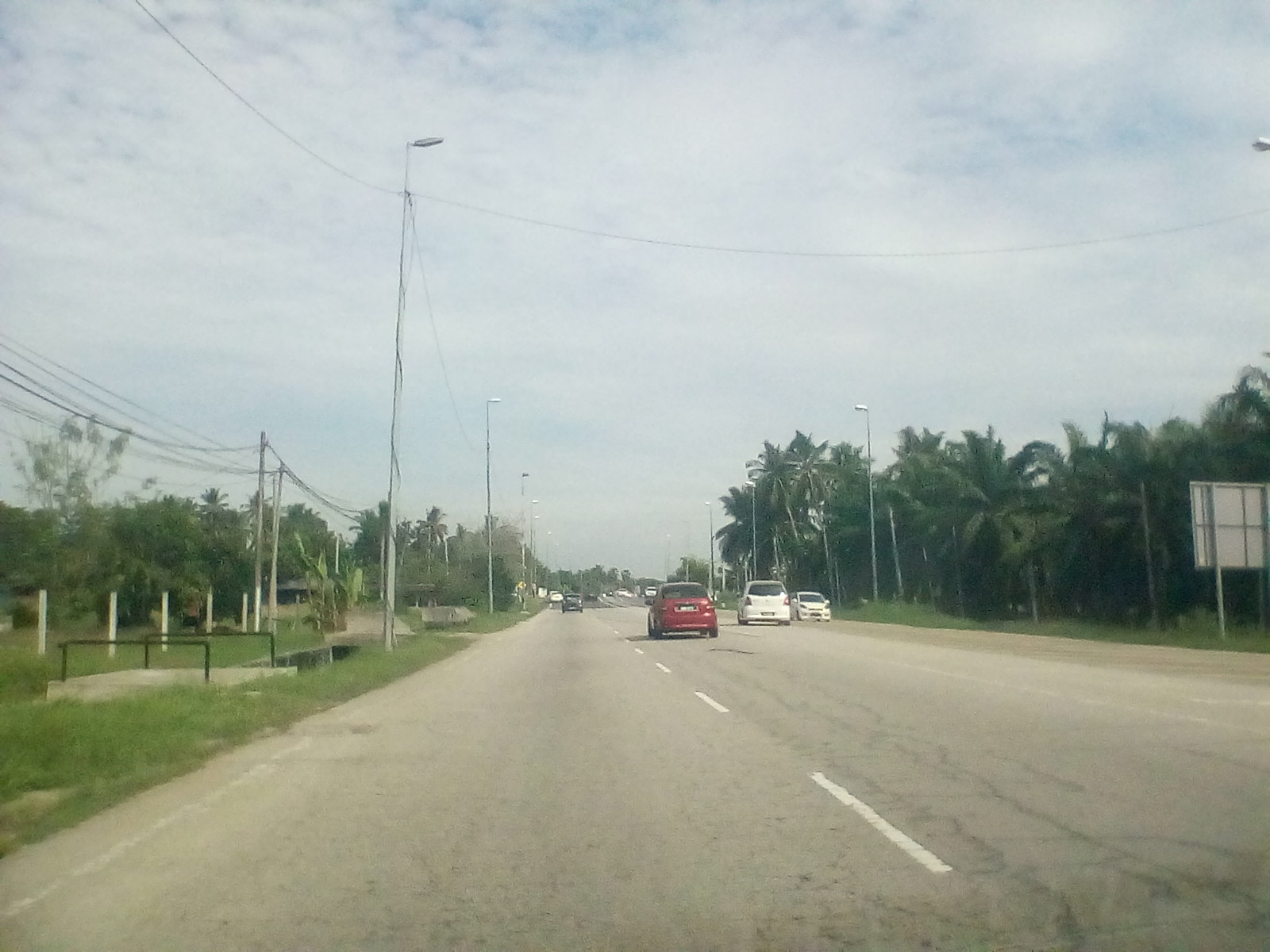
Assam Jawa

Assam Jawa in Kuala Selangor District

Assam Jawa is a small town in Kuala Selangor District, Selangor, Malaysia. This town has a T-junction which connects Kuala Selangor to Kuala Lumpur through Jalan Kuala Selangor Federal Route 54.

== Highway ==
In this town, there is a junction which connects Jalan Kapar Federal Route 5 and two expressways which are still under construction. The expressways which are under construction are the Kuala Lumpur–Kuala Selangor Expressway (KLKSE) and the West Coast Expressway (WCE). However, they were nearer to Ijok than Assam Jawa.
