= Malaysia Federal Route 96 =

Road in Malaysia

Federal Route 96
- Jalan Simpang Renggam–Benut

Route information
- Length: 19.56 km (12.15 mi)

Major junctions
- North end: Simpang Renggam
- FT 1 Federal Route 1 North–South Expressway Southern Route / AH2; FT 5 Federal Route 5
- South end: Benut

Location
- Country: Malaysia
- Primary destinations: Pontian

Highway system
- Highways in Malaysia; Expressways; Federal; State

Federal Route 96, or Jalan Simpang Renggam–Benut, is a main federal road in Johor, Malaysia. The road connects the town of Simpang Renggam to Benut in Johor. The road is also a main route to North–South Expressway Southern Route via Simpang Renggam Interchange.

== Route background ==
The Kilometre Zero of the Federal Route 96 starts at Benut, at its interchange with the Federal Route 5, the main trunk road of the west coast of Peninsular Malaysia.

== Features ==
At most sections, the Federal Route 96 was built under the JKR R5 road standard, with a speed limit of 90 km/h.

== Junction and town lists ==
The entire route is located in Johor.

Legend:

- I/C - Interchange, I/S - Intersection, RSA - Rest and service area, OBR - Overhead bridge restaurant, R/R - Restaurant and rest plaza, L/B - Layby, V/P - Vista point, TN - tunnel, T/P - Toll plaza, BR - Bridge

District	Subdistrict	Km	Exit	Name	Destinations	Notes
Kluang	Simpang Renggam	19.5		Simpang Renggam	FT 1 Malaysia Federal Route 1 – Segamat, Yong Peng, Ayer Hitam, Batu Pahat, Simpang Renggam, Kulai, Kota Tinggi, Senai, Skudai, Johor Bahru	T-junctions
Kluang	Simpang Renggam	19.0				
Kluang	Simpang Renggam			Simpang Renggam Industrial Area	Simpang Renggam Industrial Area	T-junctions
Kluang	Simpang Renggam			Simpang Renggam-NSE	North–South Expressway Southern Route / AH2 – Kuala Lumpur, Malacca, Machap, Sedenak, Kulai, Senai International Airport, Johor Bahru	T-junctions
Kluang	Simpang Renggam			Kampung Haji Abdul Salam		
Kluang	Simpang Renggam			Kampung Paya Simpang Renggam		
Pontian	Pontian			Kawasan Penempatan Ulu Benut		
Pontian	Pontian			Kampung Kasmani		
Pontian	Pontian			Kampung Batu Lima		
Pontian	Pontian			Kampung Parit Haji Yasin		
Pontian	Pontian			Kampung Parit Salleh		
Pontian	Pontian			Jalan Parit Wagiman	J108 Jalan Parit Wagiman – Parit Wagiman	T-junctions
Pontian	Pontian			Parit Wagiman	J208 Jalan Rejo Sari – Parit Botak, Parit Sikom	Junctions
Pontian	Pontian			Benut-WCE	West Coast Expressway	Under planning
Pontian	Pontian	0.0		Benut	FT 5 Malaysia Federal Route 5 – Malacca, Muar, Batu Pahat, Senggarang, Rengit, Pontian, Johor Bahru, Kukup; Jalan Jaafar – Town Centre, Jetty to Pulau Pisang	Junctions
