= Johor State Route J59 =

Road in Malaysia

Johor Route 59
- Jalan Joned/Jalan Junid

Route information
- Existed: --–present
- History: --

Major junctions
- Northwest end: Muar (Bandar Maharani, Bandar Diraja); Jalan Abdul Rahman
- FT 5 Federal Route 5 Jalan Khalidi; Jalan Abdul Rahman; Jalan Majidi
- Southeast end: Parit Amat

Location
- Country: Malaysia
- Primary destinations: Parit Sakai, Parit Bakar

Highway system
- Highways in Malaysia; Expressways; Federal; State

Johor State Route J59, Jalan Joned/Jalan Junid (Jawi: جالن جونيد) is a major road in Johor, Malaysia. There are many parit (canal) along this road.

== Features ==
- Joymon's - Known biscuit manufacturer brand in Muar, headquarters located in Jalan Junid

== Junction lists ==
The entire route is located in Muar District, Johor.

Legend:

- I/C - Interchange, I/S - Intersection, RSA - Rest and service area, OBR - Overhead bridge restaurant, R/R - Restaurant and rest plaza, L/B - Layby, V/P - Vista point, TN - tunnel, T/P - Toll plaza, BR - Bridge
- C - Cloverleaf, S - Stack, T-A - Trumpet-A, T-B - Trumpet-B, DT - Directional-T/Y, SDT - Semi-Directional-T/Y, P-Y - Partial-Y, D - Diamond, P-C - Partial cloverleaf, D-D - Diverging diamond, D-R - Direct ramp

Location	km	mi	Name	Destinations	Notes
Muar	0.0	0.0	Muar; Jalan Abdul Rahman	Jalan Abdul Rahman – Tanjung Emas, Tun Dr Ismail Memorial, Muar Rest House, District Office Residence, Jalan Ibrahim, Batu Pahat, Johor Bahru; Jalan Majidi – Town centre, Sultan Ibrahim Mosque, Sultan Abu Bakar Building	Junctions
Muar			Chung Hwa High School		
Muar			Jalan Timbalan	Jalan Timbalan – Tanjung Emas Golf Club	T-junctions
Muar			Sekolah Kebangsaan Dumpar		
Muar			Sekolah Kebangssan Jalan Joned		
Muar			Jalan Khalidi	Jalan Khalidi – Batu Pahat, Johor Bahru	Junctions
Muar			SMKA Maahad Muar		
Muar			Taman Tun Sulaiman Ninam Shah		
Muar			Jalan Parit Haji Baki	Jalan Parit Haji Baki – Jalan Sultan Ibrahim, Jalan Temenggong Ahmad, Muar Bypass, Batu Pahat, Johor Bahru, Sultan Ibrahim Stadium	Junctions
Parit Sakai			Taman Bahagia		
Parit Sakai			Taman Seri Cempaka		
Parit Sakai			Taman Cempaka Selatan		
Parit Sakai			Parit Perupok		
Parit Sakai			Taman Lembah Padang		
Parit Sakai			Parit Sakai	Parit Sakai Laut – Makam Panglima Lidah Hitam (A Famous Silat Master)	
Parit Sakai			Parit Keroma		
Parit Sakai			Parit Besar		
Parit Bakar			Parit Raja	Parit Raja Laut – Pusara 99 Mangsa Lembing Awang (The Grave of 99 Victims of Awang's Spear)	
Parit Bakar			Parit Amal		
Parit Bakar			Parit Bakar	Parit Bakar Laut	
Parit Bakar			Parit Amat Laut	Jalan Parit Amat Laut – Parit Payung	T-junctions
Parit Bakar			Parit Amat	FT 5 Malaysia Federal Route 5 – Muar, Malacca, Parit Jawa, Batu Pahat, Johor Bahru	T-junctions
1.000 mi = 1.609 km; 1.000 km = 0.621 mi
