= Negeri Sembilan State Route N167 =

Road in Malaysia

Negeri Sembilan Route 167
- Jalan Tanjung Tuan

Major junctions
- Northeast end: Port Dickson
- FT 5 Federal Route 5
- Southwest end: Tanjung Tuan (Malacca)

Location
- Country: Malaysia
- Primary destinations: Kampung Siginting

Highway system
- Highways in Malaysia; Expressways; Federal; State

Jalan Tanjung Tuan (Negeri Sembilan State Route N167) is a major road in Negeri Sembilan, Malaysia. It is a main route to Tanjung Tuan, an exclave in Malacca side.

== Junction lists ==
Legend:

- I/C - Interchange, I/S - Intersection, RSA - Rest and service area, OBR - Overhead bridge restaurant, R/R - Restaurant and rest plaza, L/B - Layby, V/P - Vista point, TN - tunnel, T/P - Toll plaza, BR - Bridge
- C - Cloverleaf, S - Stack, T-A - Trumpet-A, T-B - Trumpet-B, DT - Directional-T/Y, SDT - Semi-Directional-T/Y, P-Y - Partial-Y, D - Diamond, P-C - Partial cloverleaf, D-D - Diverging diamond, D-R - Direct ramp

| State | District | Location | km | mi | Name | Destinations | Notes |
|---|---|---|---|---|---|---|---|
| Negeri Sembilan | Port Dickson | Port Dickson | | | Port Dickson | FT 5 Malaysia Federal Route 5 – Port Dickson, Teluk Kemang, Seremban, Pasir Panjang, Linggi, Malacca | T-junctions |
| Negeri Sembilan | Port Dickson | Port Dickson | | | Tanjung Tuan Army Camp | | |
| Negeri Sembilan | Port Dickson | Port Dickson | | | Malaysian Peacekeeping Training Centre (MPTC) | Malaysian Peacekeeping Training Centre (MPTC) (Pusat Latihan Pengaman Malaysia) | |
| Negeri Sembilan | Port Dickson | Port Dickson | | | Kampung Siginting | | |
| Negeri Sembilan | Port Dickson | Port Dickson | | | Tanjung Biru Condominium | | |
| Negeri Sembilan | Port Dickson | Port Dickson | | | Tanjung Biru; Pantai Cermin | Unnamed road – Tanjung Biru, Pantai Cermin | Junctions |
| Malacca | Alor Gajah | Tanjung Tuan | | | Tanjung Tuan (Cape Rachado) | Tanjung Tuan (Cape Rachado) – Tanjung Tuan Forest Recreational Area, Tanjung Tuan Lighthouse | |
1.000 mi = 1.609 km; 1.000 km = 0.621 mi
