= Sungai Burong =

Coordinates: 3.4611392°N 101.1187376°E

- Interactive map of Sungai Burong
- Country: Malaysia
- State: Selangor
- Mukim: Tanjung Karang

Sungai Burong is a town in Tanjung Karang, Selangor, Malaysia.
