= Parit Unas =

Village in Malaysia

Coordinates: 1°59′34.5″N 102°36′52.4″E

Parit Unas is a fishing village in Muar District, Johor, Malaysia. This village is located about 2 km from Parit Bakar town.
