= Kuala Sungai Buloh =

Coordinates: 3.2699073°N 101.2898621°E

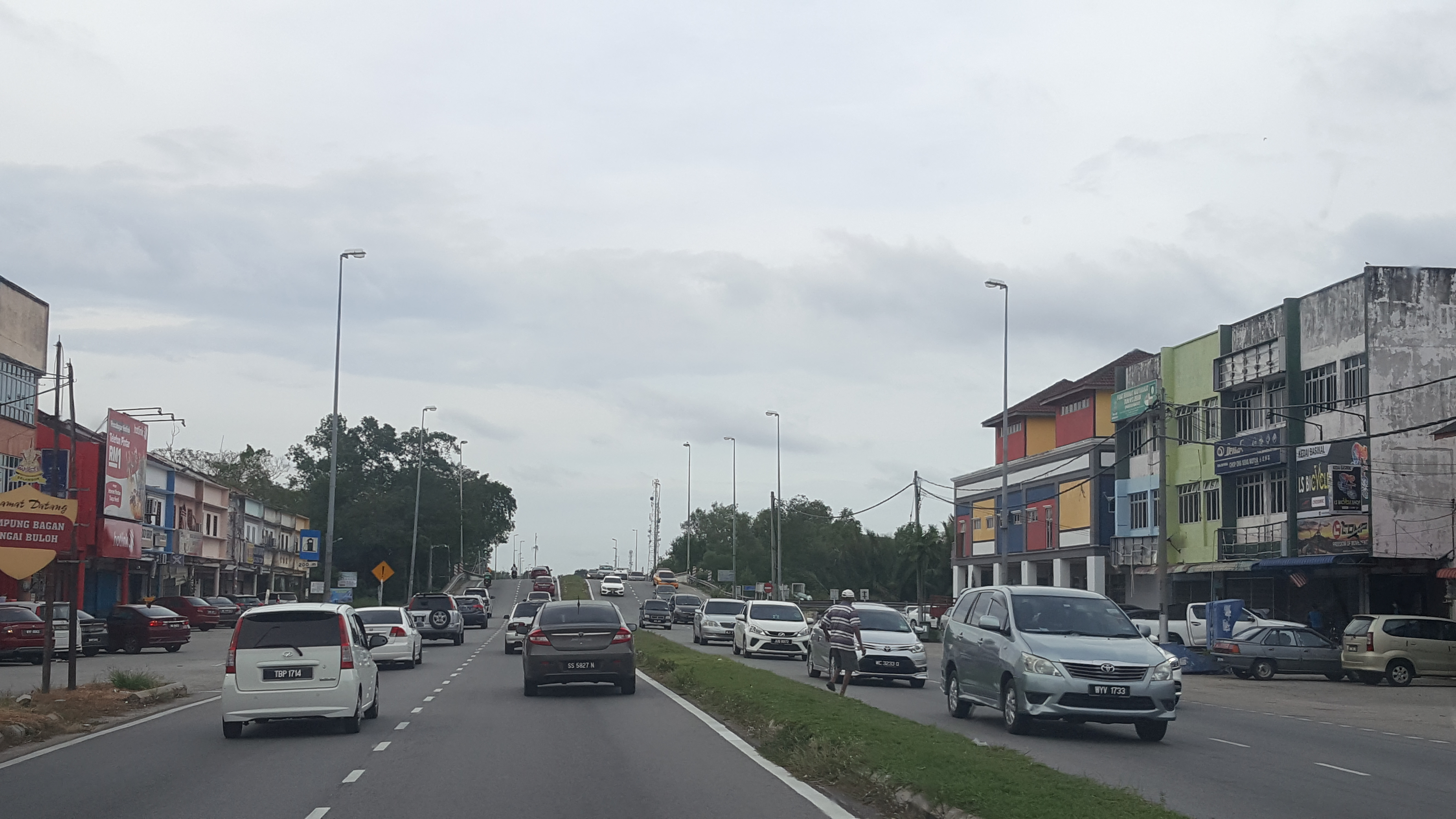
Kuala Sungai Buloh

Kuala Sungai Buloh in Kuala Selangor District

Kuala Sungai Buloh is a small fisherman's town in Kuala Selangor District, Selangor, Malaysia. This town is located about 10 kilometres south of Kuala Selangor town, near the mouth of the river named Sungai Buloh. The Town of Sungai Buloh near Kuala Lumpur is named after the same river.
