= Pasir Panjang, Negeri Sembilan =

Pasir Panjang
- Town
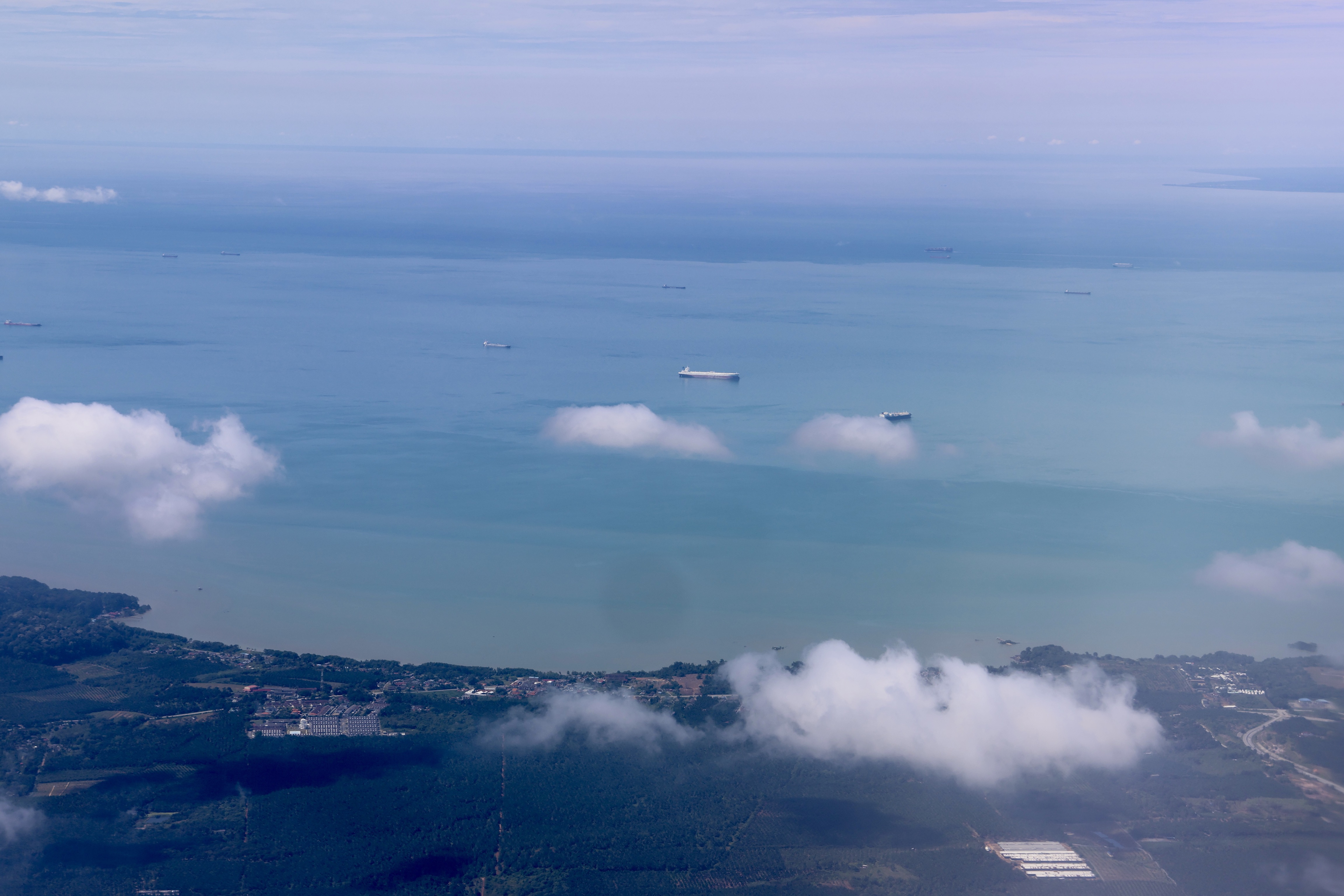
- Strait of Malacca coastline in Pasir Panjang

- Location of Pasir Panjang Pasir Panjang (Peninsular Malaysia) Pasir Panjang (Malaysia)
- Coordinates: 2.433°N 101.933°E
- Country: Malaysia
- State: Negeri Sembilan
- District: Port Dickson
- Luak: Sungai Ujong
- Elevation: 21 m (69 ft)
- Time zone: UTC+8 (MYT)
- Postal code: 71250

Pasir Panjang is a small town in Port Dickson District, Negeri Sembilan, Malaysia.
