= Pedas =

Mukim in Rembau, Negeri Sembilan, Malaysia

Coordinates: 2°37′N 102°04′E

Pedas Podeh (Negeri Sembilan Malay)
- Mukim
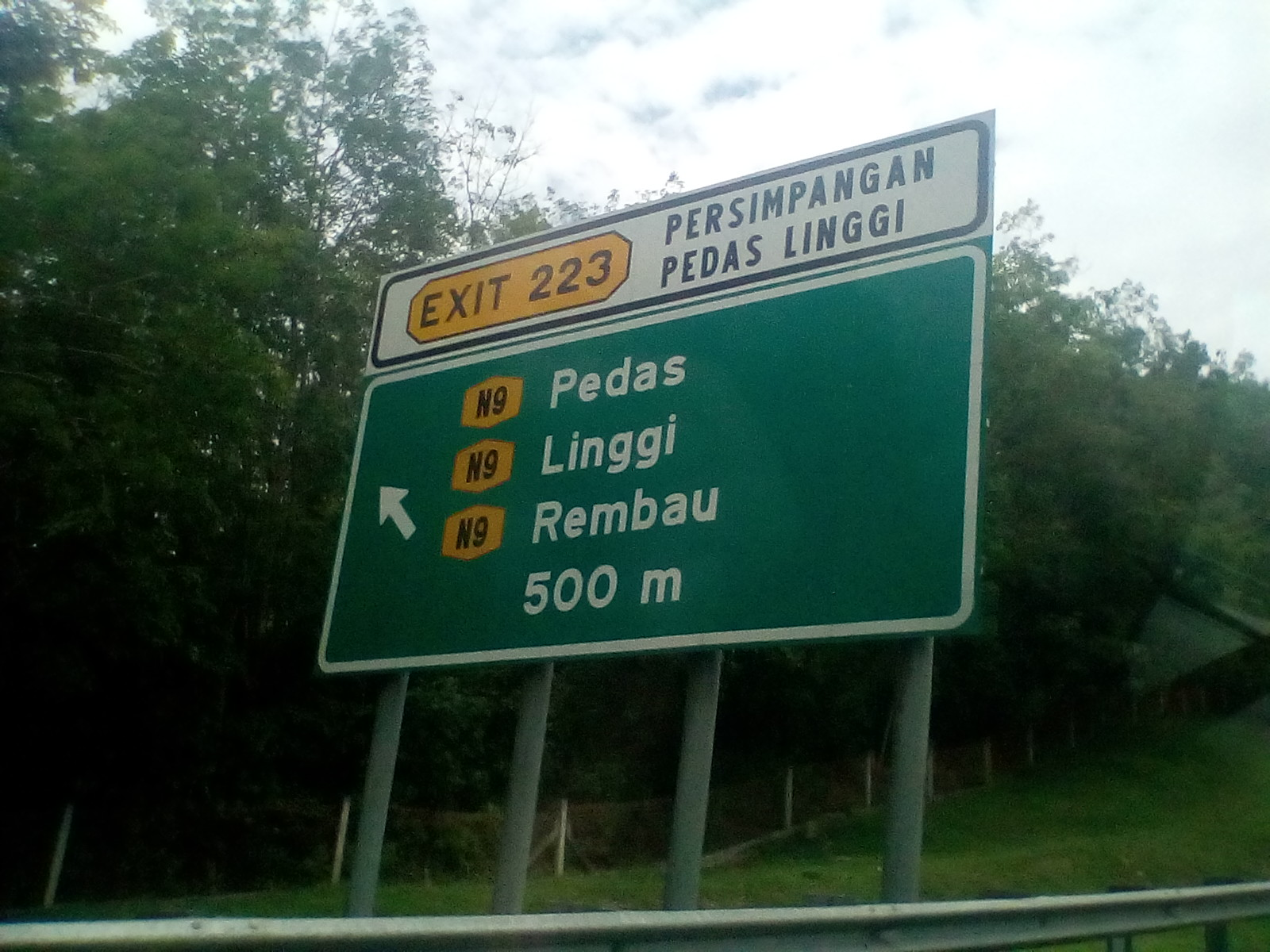
- Pedas/Linggi Interchange
- Interactive map of Pedas
- Country: Malaysia
- State: Negeri Sembilan
- District/Luak: Rembau

Pedas in Rembau District

Pedas (lit. 'spicy' in Malay, Negeri Sembilan Malay: Podeh) is a mukim in Rembau District, Negeri Sembilan, Malaysia. It has one main street with a police station, a post office and shops. A hot spring is located in the nearby village of Air Panas which is now developed into a water park and spa resort, known as Wet World Pedas Water Park and Hotspring.
