= Kampung Sungai Haji Dorani =

Kampung Sungai Haji Dorani is a small village in Sabak Bernam District, Selangor, Malaysia. It is located at Sungai Besar.
