= Sultan Ibrahim Mosque =

Mosque in Kuala Selangor, Selangor, Malaysia

- Masjid Sultan Ibrahim

Religion
- Affiliation: Sunni Islam

Location
- Location: Kuala Selangor, Selangor, Malaysia
- Interactive map of Sultan Ibrahim Mosque
- Coordinates: 3°19′42.6″N 101°15′27.9″E

Architecture
- Type: Mosque
- Completed: 1982

Sultan Ibrahim Mosque is the district mosque of Kuala Selangor, Selangor, Malaysia.

== History ==
The mosque's cost of construction was RM 10.7 million, which was fully borne by the state government. Construction began in 1980 and was completed in 1982. The mosque was officially opened in 1982 by Almarhum Sultan Salahuddin Abdul Aziz Shah of Selangor during his official visit to Kuala Selangor.

== Architecture ==
It was built in a Modernist style.

== See also ==
- Islam in Malaysia
