= Lekir =

Mukim in Manjung, Perak, Malaysia

Coordinates: 4°08′N 100°44′E

- Mukim
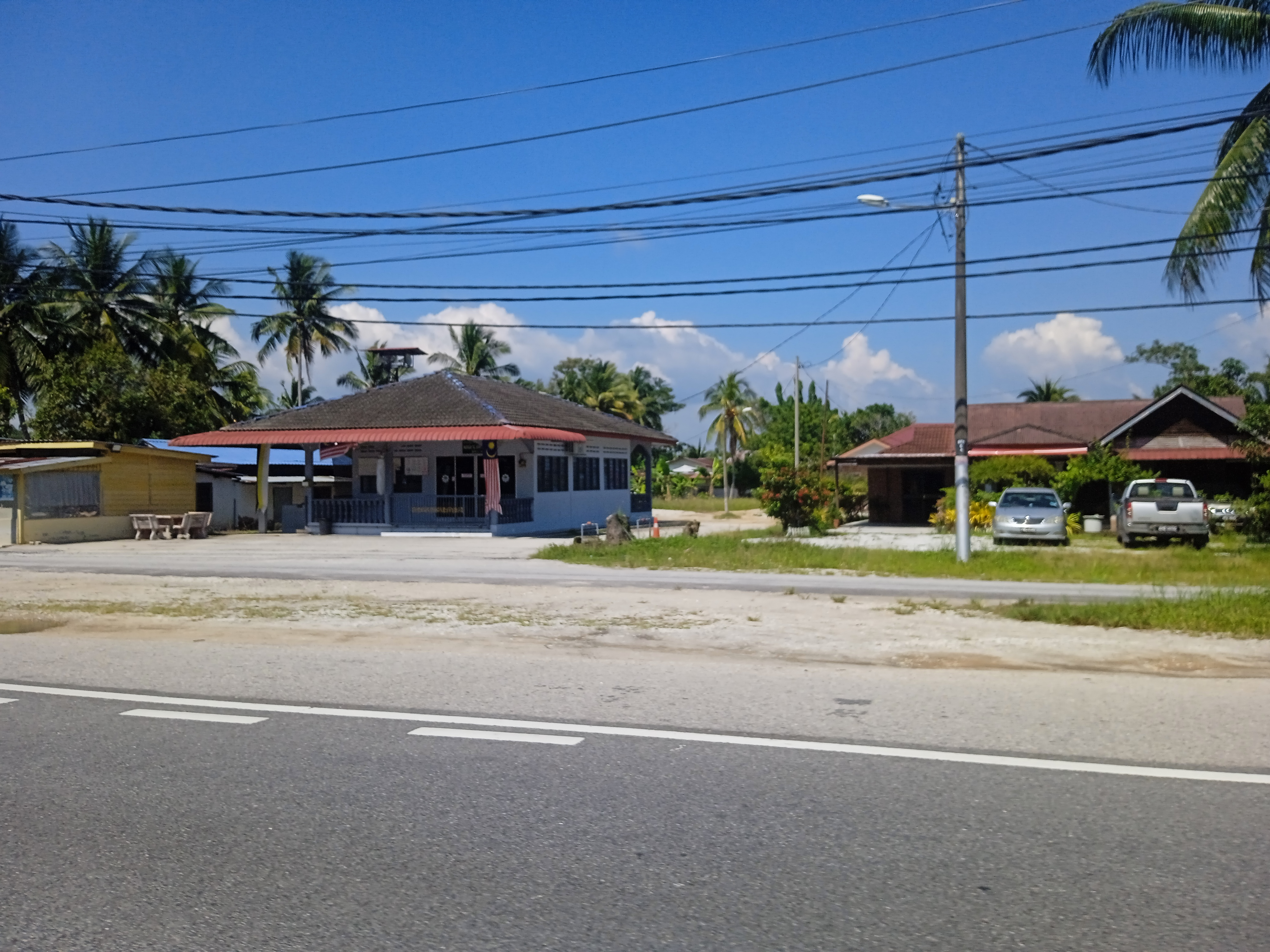
- Interactive map of Lekir

Population
  - Total: 14,576

Lekir (Jawi: لكير; Chinese: 力侨) is a mukim in Manjung District, Perak, Malaysia. Sufian Shukor is the Penghulu Mukim of Lekir. Gaining attention for the building of a new industrial park, Lekhir has been building up its industrial and agricultural industry. Lekir produces high amounts of Cockle, boosted by a government program to stabilize incomes of fishermen, leading them to be put into Malaysia's Book of Records. The industry & government has also focused on making halal items and manufacturing halal food items, especially gelatin.
