= Parit Jawa =

Human settlement in Malaysia

Coordinates: 1°57′N 102°39′E

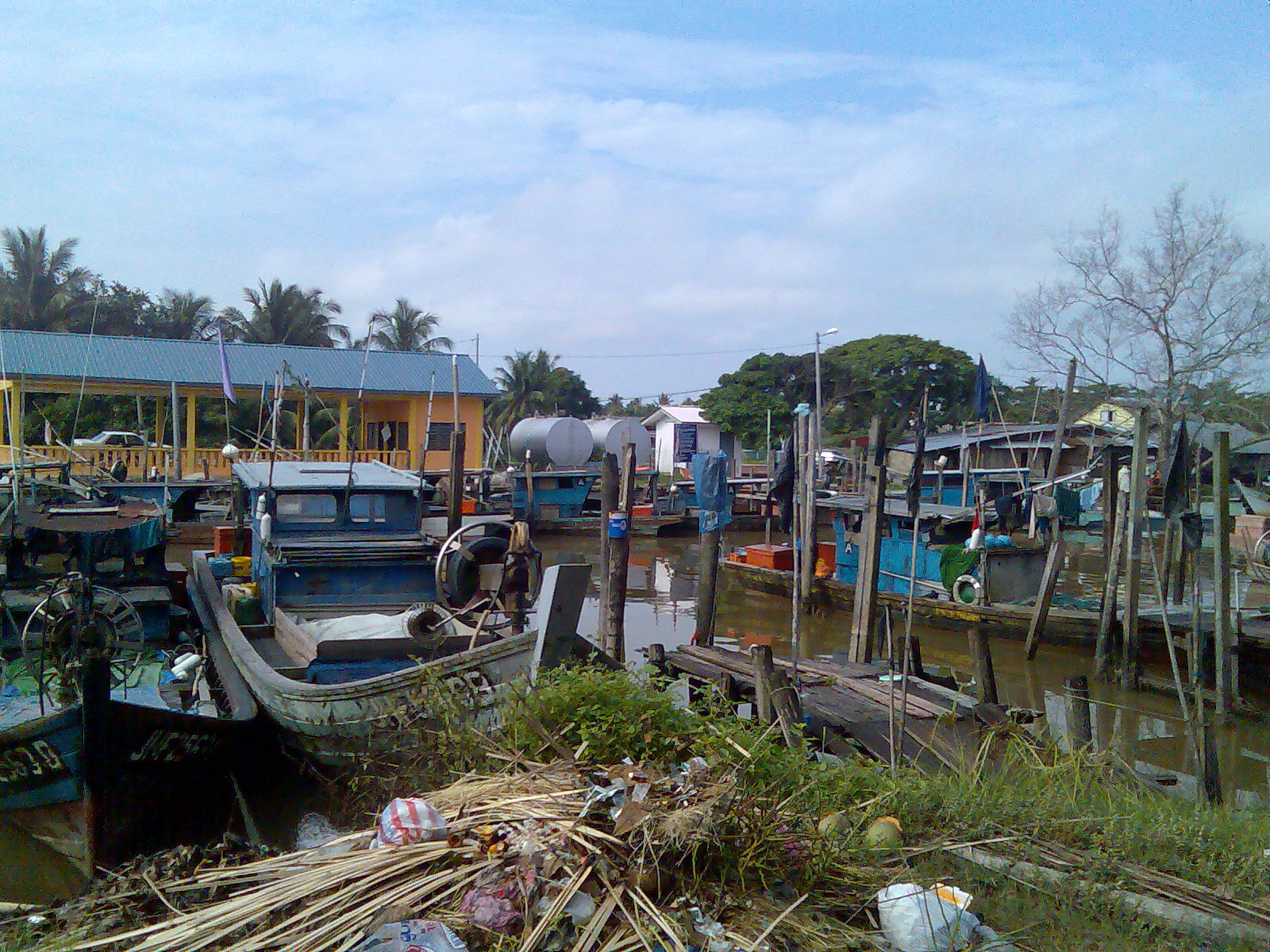
Parit Jawa

Parit Jawa in Muar District

Parit Jawa is a mukim in Muar District, Johor, Malaysia.

== Geography ==
Parit Jawa covers an area of 71 square kilometers and has a population of 11,319 residents. It is located along the Strait of Malacca. The main connecting roads are Jalan Jabbar, Jalan Mahmood, Jalan Temenggong Ahmad, and Jalan Omar.

== Demographics ==
The population is approximately 80% Malay (primarily of Javanese descent), 14% Chinese, and 6% Indian.

== See also ==
- Leka Beach
