= Parit Bakar =

Human settlement in Malaysia

- Town in Malaysia

Other transcription(s)
  - Chinese: 巴力峇九
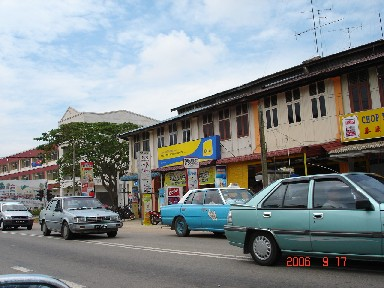
- Parit Bakar

- Parit Bakar in Johor, Malay Peninsular and Malaysia Parit Bakar (Peninsular Malaysia) Parit Bakar (Malaysia)
- Coordinates: 2°00′09.8″N 102°36′07.3″E
- Country: Malaysia
- State: Johor
- District: Muar

Area
  - Total: 40 km^{2} (15 sq mi)
- Elevation: 6.1 m (20 ft)
- Time zone: UTC+8 (MYT)
- Postal code: 84000

Parit Bakar in Muar District

Parit Bakar (Chinese: 巴力峇九) is a small town in Muar District, Johor, Malaysia. It is subdivided to "Parit Bakar Darat" and " Parit Bakar Laut". Parit Bakar Laut is 1 km towards the coastline from Parit Bakar town centre.

The centre of the township consists of a Chinese primary school, Chi Sin Primary School, a Chinese temple, Long Shan Yan Temple (龙山岩), and a few rows of shop.

At the junction of Jalan Abdul Rahman and Jalan Parit Bakar, is the new Parit Bakar Mosque, which was rebuilt in 2004. Its roof, which resembles a pagoda instead of the usual dome, is similar to the historic Tranquerah Mosque in Malacca.

== Geography ==
The town spans over an area of 40 km^{2}.

== Economy ==
The main industries of the town are small and medium enterprises.

== Transportation ==
Parit Bakar can be reached by travelling along Jalan Temenggung Ahmad (Temenggung Ahmad Road) for 10 minutes from Muar.
