= Johor State Route J32 =

Road in Malaysia

Johor Route 32
- Jalan Muar–Labis
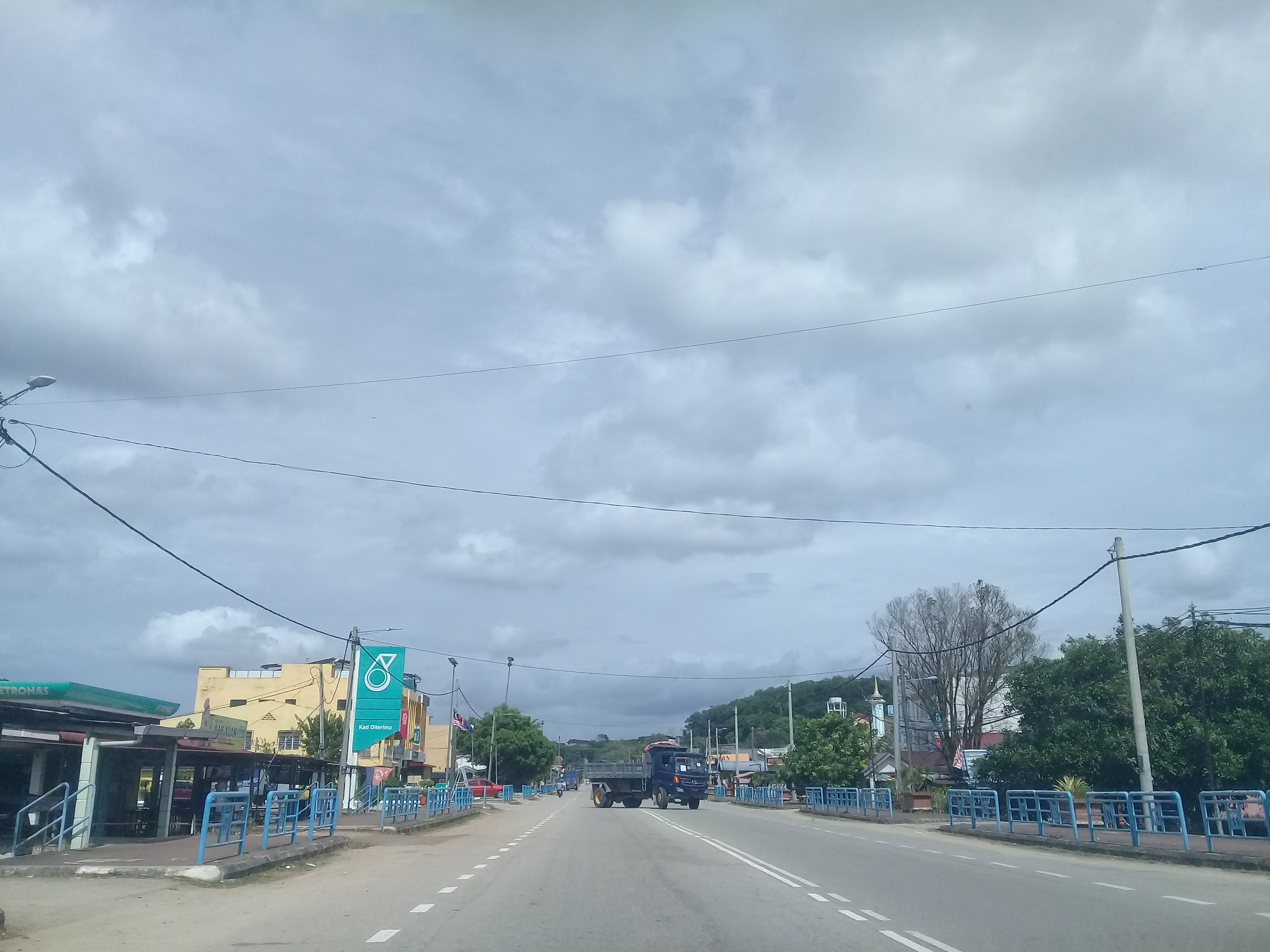

Route information
- Length: 87 km (54 mi)

Major junctions
- West end: Bukit Treh-Muar Bypass
- J24 State Route J24; FT 224 Muar Bypass; J29 State Route J29; J141 State Route J141; J135 State Route J135; J190 State Route J190; North–South Expressway Southern Route / AH2; J137 State Route J137; J139 State Route J139; J23 State Route J23; J34 State Route J34; J41 State Route J41 FT 1 / AH142 Federal Route 1
- East end: Labis

Location
- Country: Malaysia
- Primary destinations: Bukit Pasir, Panchor, Pagoh University Town, Pagoh, Lenga, Bukit Kepong, Bukit Serampang

Highway system
- Highways in Malaysia; Expressways; Federal; State

Johor State Route J32, Jalan Muar–Labis is a major road in Johor, Malaysia. It is the longest state road in Johor with the total distance of 87 km (54 mi). It connects the town of Bukit Treh in Muar to Labis via the Muar Bypass. It is also a main route to North–South Expressway Southern Route via Pagoh Interchange. Some of the maps still labelled J24 Jalan Salleh as J32 since the Jalan Salleh is connected to Jalan Muar–Labis. The Jalan Salleh formerly was part of State Route J32.

== Route background ==
The Kilometre Zero of State Route J32 is located at Labis.

== History ==
Originally, the road was only paved from Muar to Lenga and another section near Labis; however, the road was fully paved in the 1970s as a result of the opening of many FELDA settlements along Labis–Lenga stretch.

Due to the narrow T-junctions in Lenga that only allowed small vehicles passing, the Lenga bypass is built for heavier vehicles.

== Features ==
=== Notable features ===
- Main route to North–South Expressway Southern Route via Pagoh Interchange
- Pagoh University Town
- Bukit Kepong, the historical town during Malayan Emergency (1948–1960)
- Alternative route from Tangkak and Jementah bypassing Segamat to Labis and Chaah

At most sections, the Johor State Route J32 was built under the JKR R5 road standard, with a speed limit to 90 km/h.

=== Dual carriageway section ===
==== Four (4) lanes ====
- Pagoh Jaya intersections–Bandar Universiti Pagoh

=== Alternate routes ===
- Pagoh Jaya bypass
- Lenga bypass – For heavier vehicles

== Junction lists ==
The entire route is located in Johor.

Legend:

- I/C - Interchange, I/S - Intersection, RSA - Rest and service area, OBR - Overhead bridge restaurant, R/R - Restaurant and rest plaza, L/B - Layby, V/P - Vista point, TN - tunnel, T/P - Toll plaza, BR - Bridge
- C - Cloverleaf, S - Stack, T-A - Trumpet-A, T-B - Trumpet-B, DT - Directional-T/Y, SDT - Semi-Directional-T/Y, P-Y - Partial-Y, D - Diamond, P-C - Partial cloverleaf, D-D - Diverging diamond, D-R - Direct ramp

District	Subdistrict	km	Exit	Name	Destinations	Notes
Through to J24 Jalan Salleh
Muar	Muar		3B	Bukit Treh-Muar Bypass I/S	FT 224 Muar Bypass – Malacca, Tangkak, Jementah, Segamat, Sabak Awor fish grill, Parit Sulong, Yong Peng, Batu Pahat; North–South Expressway Southern Route / AH2 – Kuala Lumpur, Seremban	Interchange
Muar	Muar			Jalan Bukit Treh	Jalan Bukit Treh – Kampung Bukit Treh	T-junctions
Muar	Muar			Kampung Temiang		
Muar	Muar			Jalan Sungai Abong Baru	J-- Jalan Sungai Abong Baru – Sungai Abong, Malaysian Road Transport Department (JPJ) district branch office	T-junctions
Muar	Muar		BR	Sungai Terap bridge		
Muar	Muar			Sungai Terap	J141 Johor State Route J141 – Jorak, Tanjung Olak, Bukit Pasir Industrial Area, Kota Buruk Historical Site, Medan Ikan Bakar Tanjung Olak (Tanjung Olak fish grill spot); J135 Johor State Route J135 – Simpang Jeram, Sungai Abong	Junctions
Muar	Muar		L/B	Shell L/B	Shell	
Muar	Muar			Bukit Pasir	Masjid Bukit Pasir	
Muar	Muar		L/B	Petronas L/B	Petronas	
Muar	Muar			Bukit Pasir; Jalan Naib Kadir	J190 Jalan Naib Kadir – Kampung Naib Kadir	T-junctions
Muar	Muar			Bukit Pasir	Sekolah Kebangsaan Bukit Pasir	
Muar	Muar			Bukit Pasir	Jalan Masjid – Jorak, Tanjung Olak, Bukit Pasir Industrial Area, Kota Buruk Historical Site, Tanjung Olak fish grill spot	Junctions
Muar	Muar			Bukit Pasir Chinese Cemetery		
Muar	Muar		BR	Sungai Merbudu bridge		
Muar	Muar			Kampung Batu 10 Bukit Pasir	Craigella Estate	T-junctions
Muar	Muar			Kampung Paya Panjang		
Muar	Muar			Craigella Estate		T-junctions
Muar	Muar			Quarry mines	Quarry mines	T-junctions
Muar	Muar			Nasuha National Service Camp		T-junctions
Muar	Muar			Quarry mines	Quarry mines	T-junctions
Muar	Muar			Nasuha Herbs Spices Paradise	Nasuha Herbs Spices Paradise – Visitors centre, Chalet, Herbs & spices shop, Herbs Museum; V	T-junctions
Muar	Muar		L/B	Caltex L/B	Caltex	
Muar	Muar			Pagoh; Pagoh Jaya	Persiaran Pagoh Jaya – Pagoh Jaya	T-junctions
Muar	Muar			Pagoh; IKBN Pagoh	Institut Kemahiran Belia Negara (IKBN) Pagoh	T-junctions
Muar	Muar			Pagoh; Pagoh Industrial Area II	Jalan Kempas – Pagoh Industrial Area I	T-junctions
Muar	Muar		I/S	Pagoh; Pagoh-NSE	North–South Expressway Southern Route / AH2 – Kuala Lumpur, Malacca, Bukit Gambir, Yong Peng, Ayer Hitam, Johor Bahru	T-junctions
Muar	Muar			Pagoh; Pagoh University Town; Jalan Panchor	J137 Johor State Route J137 – Panchor, Gerisek, Bukit Gambir; Pagoh University Town –International Islamic University Malaysia (IIUM) Southern Campus, Tun Hussein Onn University of Malaysia (UTHM) Pagoh Campus, University of Technology Malaysia (UTM) Research Centre, Politeknik Pagoh	T-junctions
Muar	Muar			Pagoh; Pagoh University Town	Agro Bazzar, Kompleks Seri Pekembar	
Muar	Muar			Pagoh; Pagoh University Town	Pusat Komersil Pagoh	Junctions
Muar	Muar		BR	Sungai Pagoh bridge		
Muar	Muar			Pagoh; Pagoh University Town; Pagoh Industrial Area III	Pagoh Industrial Area III	Junctions
Muar	Muar			Pagoh; Jalan Kampung Raja	J139 Johor State Route J139 – Kampung Raja, Masjid Kampung Raja, Sultan Alauddin Riayat Syah I Mausoleum; Jalan Gelam – Kampung Sari Baharu	Junctions
Muar	Muar		L/B	Petronas L/B	Petronas	
Muar	Muar			Pagoh		
Muar	Muar		L/B	Shell L/B	Shell	
Muar	Muar			Pagoh		
Muar	Muar		12	Pagoh; Jalan Pagoh–Parit Sulong	J23 Johor State Route J23 – Kangka, Parit Sulong, Dusun Damai, Batu Pahat, Yong Peng	T-junctions
Muar	Muar			SMKSARS1	Sekolah Menengah Kebangsaan Sultan Alauddin Riayat Syah I, Pagoh (SMKSARS1)	
Muar	Muar			Kampung Paya Redan		
Muar	Muar		13	Jalan Renchong	J145 Johor State Route J145 – Renchong	T-junctions
Muar	Muar			Kampung Haji Sirat		
Muar	Muar			Jalan Renchong	J145 Johor State Route J145 – Renchong	T-junctions
Muar	Muar			Lenga	Masjid Jamek Lenga, Makam Kiyai Sheikh Fadhil Banten	
Muar	Muar			Lenga; Lenga Bypass	Lenga Bypass – Bukit Kepong, Labis; Lenga town centre	Junctions
Muar	Muar			Lenga		Town narrow T-junctions
Muar	Muar			Lenga; Lenga Bypass	Lenga Bypass – Pagoh, Bukit Pasir, Muar	T-junctions
Muar	Muar			Kampung Jawa		
Muar	Muar			Kampung Sungai Meda Luar		
Muar	Muar		BR	Sungai Meda Luar bridge		
Muar	Muar			Bukit Kepong	Bukit Kepong Historical Complex – Bukit Kepong Historical Police Station, Bukit Kepong Heroes Memorial, Bukit Kepong Police Museum	Historical site
Muar	Muar			Bukit Kepong	Masjid Jamek Bukit Kepong, Bukit Kepong Police's Heroes Mausoleum	
Muar	Muar			Bukit Kepong	J34 Johor State Route J34 – Bukit Serampang, Sagil, Tangkak, Jementah, Segamat	T-junctions
Muar	Muar			Bukit Kepong	J230 Johor State Route J230 – Kampung Raja, FELDA Maokil, Bekok, Chaah, Yong Peng	T-junctions
Muar	Muar			Jalan Pogoh	J41 Johor State Route J41 – Segamat, Kampung Pogoh, Kuantan	T-junctions
Muar	Muar			FELDA Bukit Kepong	FELDA Bukit Kepong	T-junctions
Muar–Segamat district border			BR	Sungai Labis bridge		
Segamat	Labis			FELDA Chemplak Barat	FELDA Chemplak Barat	T-junctions
Segamat	Labis			FELDA Chemplak	FELDA Chemplak	T-junctions
Segamat	Labis			Labis; Rumah Rakyat Labis	Rumah Rakyat Labis	T-junctions
Segamat	Labis			Labis; Kampung Temeroh		
Segamat	Labis	0.0	I/S	Labis	FT 1 / AH142 Malaysia Federal Route 1 – Labis town centre, Pekan Air Panas, Segamat, Gemas, Kuantan, Bekok, Paloh, Chaah, Yong Peng, Ayer Hitam; North–South Expressway Southern Route / AH2 – Johor Bahru, Singapore; Jalan Stesen Keretapi Labis – Labis railway station KTM ETS	Junctions
