= Johor State Route J135 =

Road in Malaysia

Johor Route 135
- Jalan Sungai Terap–Simpang Jeram
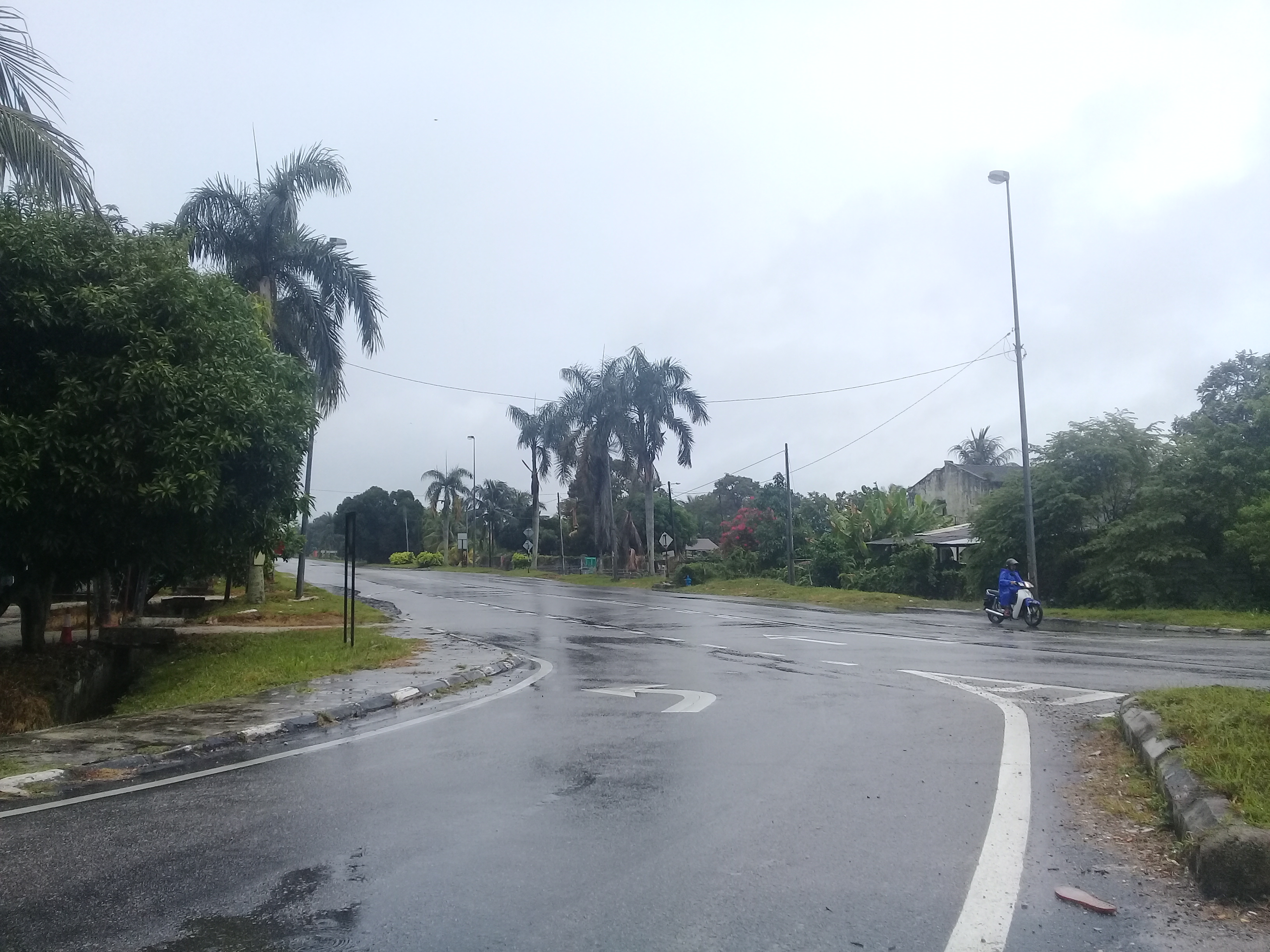

Major junctions
- North end: Sungai Terap
- J141 Jalan Jorak; J32 Jalan Muar–Labis; FT 24 Federal Route 24
- South end: Simpang Jeram

Location
- Country: Malaysia
- Primary destinations: Jorak, Bukit Pasir, Pagoh, Sungai Abong

Highway system
- Highways in Malaysia; Expressways; Federal; State

Johor State Route J135, Jalan Sungai Terap–Simpang Jeram is a major road in Johor, Malaysia.

== Junction lists ==
The entire route is located in Muar District, Johor.

Legend:

- I/C - Interchange, I/S - Intersection, RSA - Rest and service area, OBR - Overhead bridge restaurant, R/R - Restaurant and rest plaza, L/B - Layby, V/P - Vista point, TN - tunnel, T/P - Toll plaza, BR - Bridge
- C - Cloverleaf, S - Stack, T-A - Trumpet-A, T-B - Trumpet-B, DT - Directional-T/Y, SDT - Semi-Directional-T/Y, P-Y - Partial-Y, D - Diamond, P-C - Partial cloverleaf, D-D - Diverging diamond, D-R - Direct ramp

km	Exit	Name	Destinations	Notes
		Sungai Terap	J141 Jalan Jorak – Jorak, Tanjung Olak, Bukit Pasir Industrial Area, Kota Buruk Historical Site, Medan Ikan Bakar Tanjung Olak (Tanjung Olak fish grill spot); J32 Jalan Muar–Labis – Bandar Maharani Bandar Diraja (Muar) (Royal Town), Bukit Pasir, Bandar Universiti Pagoh, Pagoh, Bukit Kepong, Labis; North–South Expressway Southern Route / AH2 – Kuala Lumpur, Johor Bahru	Junctions
		Jalan Naib Kadir	J190 Jalan Naib Kadir – Bukit Pasir	T-junctions
		Kampung Teluk Kemang		
	BR	Sungai Terap bridge		
		Jalan Kampung Tengah	Jalan Kampung Tengah – Kampung Tengah, Sungai Abong, Kampung Jeram	Junctions
		Jalan Sungai Abong	Jalan Sungai Abong – Sungai Abong	T-junctions
		Kampung Jeram Tepi		
		Simpang Jeram	FT 24 Malaysia Federal Route 24 – Bandar Maharani Bandar Diraja (Muar) (Royal Town), Tangkak, Segamat, Malacca, Bakri, Parit Sulong, Yong Peng, Batu Pahat	T-junctions
