= Biawak Busuk =

Historic site in Malaysia

Kota Biawak Busuk, literally means "Fort of Smelly Monitor Lizard" in Malay is a historic site believed to be located near the site of another historic site the Kota Buruk, most possibly nearby or at today's Kampung Tanjung Selabu, Jorak, Sungai Terap, Bukit Pasir, Pagoh, Muar, Johor, Malaysia. The site of Kota Buruk is being preserved by the government and is open to the public for visit.

Biawak Busuk is a location unable to be exactly and specifically determined in the modern days but it was a place mentioned in the history of Malacca sultanate which Parameswara said to open after encountering many monitor lizards exposing a disgusting smell in large quantity. There are few version of history records as follow i.e.:

- João de Barros ("Decades of Asia"), (1553): João de Barros who wrote in 1553 in his 2nd Décadas da Ásia ("Decades of Asia"), a history of the Portuguese in India and Asia stated that Parameswara (Paramicura) who were driven away from Temasik after he killed the representative of the King of Siam, Temagi; had escaped in exile and stopped in Muar and built in rural areas of Muar called Pagoh.
- Tun Sri Lanang (Sejarah Melayu or Malay Annals) Shellabear version: In the Sejarah Melayu or Malay Annals states that Temasik during the reign of Parameswara (Sultan Iskandar Shah) was defeated by Majapahit Kingdom. But he and his family including his father and followers had fled to Pagoh, Muar and opened 2 areas on the banks of the Muar River; the Biawak Busuk and another fort called Kota Buruk before moved to Malacca and opened up Malacca. In 1488, Malacca's Sultan Alauddin Riayat Shah (1477–1488) has died and buried in Pagoh, Ulu Muar.
- Tomé Pires (Suma Oriental): This source highlighted the emergence of Parameswara replacing his father, Raja Sam Agi as the ruler of Palembang who had opened Malacca later. He was attacked by the king of Majapahit of Java, King Batara Tamavill for declaring himself as 'Mjeura' (those who dare) and fled to Temasik (Singapore). After killing Siamese King of Ayutthaya representative, Temagi there, he secretly ruled Temasik for 5 years. But fearing the revenge attacked by the King of Ayutthaya, he fled to Pagoh, Muar with his 1,000 followers and lived there for 6 years when the Seletar peoples were still occupying Malacca.
