= Johor State Route J41 =

Road in Malaysia

Johor Route 41

Route information
- Length: 20 km (12 mi)

Major junctions
- Northeast end: Segamat
- FT 1 Federal Route 1 J32 State Route J32
- Southwest end: Bukit Kepong

Location
- Country: Malaysia
- Primary destinations: Kampung Paya Pulai, Kampung Pogoh, Felcra Pogoh

Highway system
- Highways in Malaysia; Expressways; Federal; State

Jalan Pogoh, Johor State Route J41 is a main state road in Johor, connecting Segamat and Bukit Kepong. It is the main road of the Mukim Pogoh in Segamat. The length of this road is 20 kilometres (12 mi). Jalan Pogoh had been only paved halfway from Segamat to Kampung Pogoh (10 kilometres (6.2 mi)). At the end of the 1990s, the entire road was fully paved. During the pavement works for the remaining stretch, works included raising the road level because of the flood-prone areas along the stretch and also replacing all wooden bridges along the road with concrete bridges, thus abolishing the former weight limit of the road, previously 8 tonnes.

== Features ==
- Alternative routes from Gemas and Segamat to Labis, Chaah and Yong Peng

== Junction lists ==
The entire route is located in Johor.

Legend:

- I/C - Interchange, I/S - Intersection, RSA - Rest and service area, OBR - Overhead bridge restaurant, R/R - Restaurant and rest plaza, L/B - Layby, V/P - Vista point, TN - tunnel, T/P - Toll plaza, BR - Bridge
- C - Cloverleaf, S - Stack, T-A - Trumpet-A, T-B - Trumpet-B, DT - Directional-T/Y, SDT - Semi-Directional-T/Y, P-Y - Partial-Y, D - Diamond, P-C - Partial cloverleaf, D-D - Diverging diamond, D-R - Direct ramp

District	Location	km	mi	Name	Destinations	Notes
Segamat	Segamat			Segamat	FT 1 Malaysia Federal Route 1 – Segamat town centre, Jementah, Tangkak, Kuantan, Labis, Bekok, Chaah, Paloh, Yong Peng; North–South Expressway Southern Route / AH2 – Kuala Lumpur, Malacca Johor Bahru, Singapore	T-junctions
Segamat	Segamat			Taman Perling	Taman Perling	T-junctions
Segamat	Paya Pulai			Kampung Paya Pulai		
Segamat	Pogoh			Kampung Pogoh	Unnamed road – Alternative route to Federal Route 23	T-junctions
Segamat	Pogoh			Kampung Chodan		
Segamat	Pogoh			FELCRA Pogoh	FELCRA Pogoh	T-junctions
Segamat–Muar district border				Sungai Labis bridge		
Muar	Bukit Kepong			Bukit Kepong	J32 Johor State Route J32 – Muar, Pagoh, Bukit Kepong, Labis, Paloh, Yong Peng; North–South Expressway Southern Route / AH2 – Johor Bahru, Singapore	T-junctions
1.000 mi = 1.609 km; 1.000 km = 0.621 mi
