= Johor State Route J141 =

Road in Malaysia

Johor Route 141
- Jalan Jorak

Major junctions
- Northeast end: Tanjung Olak
- J32 State Route J32; J135 State Route J135
- Southwest end: Sungai Terap

Location
- Country: Malaysia
- Primary destinations: Jorak

Highway system
- Highways in Malaysia; Expressways; Federal; State

Jalan Jorak, Johor State Route J141 is a major road in Johor, Malaysia.

== Junction lists ==
The entire route is located in Muar District, Johor.

Legend:

- I/C - Interchange, I/S - Intersection, RSA - Rest and service area, OBR - Overhead bridge restaurant, R/R - Restaurant and rest plaza, L/B - Layby, V/P - Vista point, TN - tunnel, T/P - Toll plaza, BR - Bridge
- C - Cloverleaf, S - Stack, T-A - Trumpet-A, T-B - Trumpet-B, DT - Directional-T/Y, SDT - Semi-Directional-T/Y, P-Y - Partial-Y, D - Diamond, P-C - Partial cloverleaf, D-D - Diverging diamond, D-R - Direct ramp

km	Exit	Name	Destinations	Notes
		Sungai Terap	J32 Johor State Route J32 – Muar, Bukit Pasir, Bandar Universiti Pagoh, Pagoh, Bukit Kepong, Labis; North–South Expressway Southern Route / AH2 – Kuala Lumpur, Johor Bahru; J135 Johor State Route J135 – Simpang Jeram, Sungai Abong	Junctions
		Tanjung Siput		
		Bukit Pasir Industrial Area		
		Kampung Jalan Masjid	J65 Jalan Jorak–Bukit Pasir – Bukit Pasir	T-junctions
		Kampung Pengkalan Bukit		
		Kota Buruk Historical Site	Kota Buruk Historical Site	Historical site
		Kampung Tanjung Olak		
		Tanjung Olak	Medan Ikan Bakar Tanjung Olak, Tanjung Olak fish grill spot V	
