= Johor State Route J145 =

Road in Malaysia

Johor Route 145
- Jalan Renchong
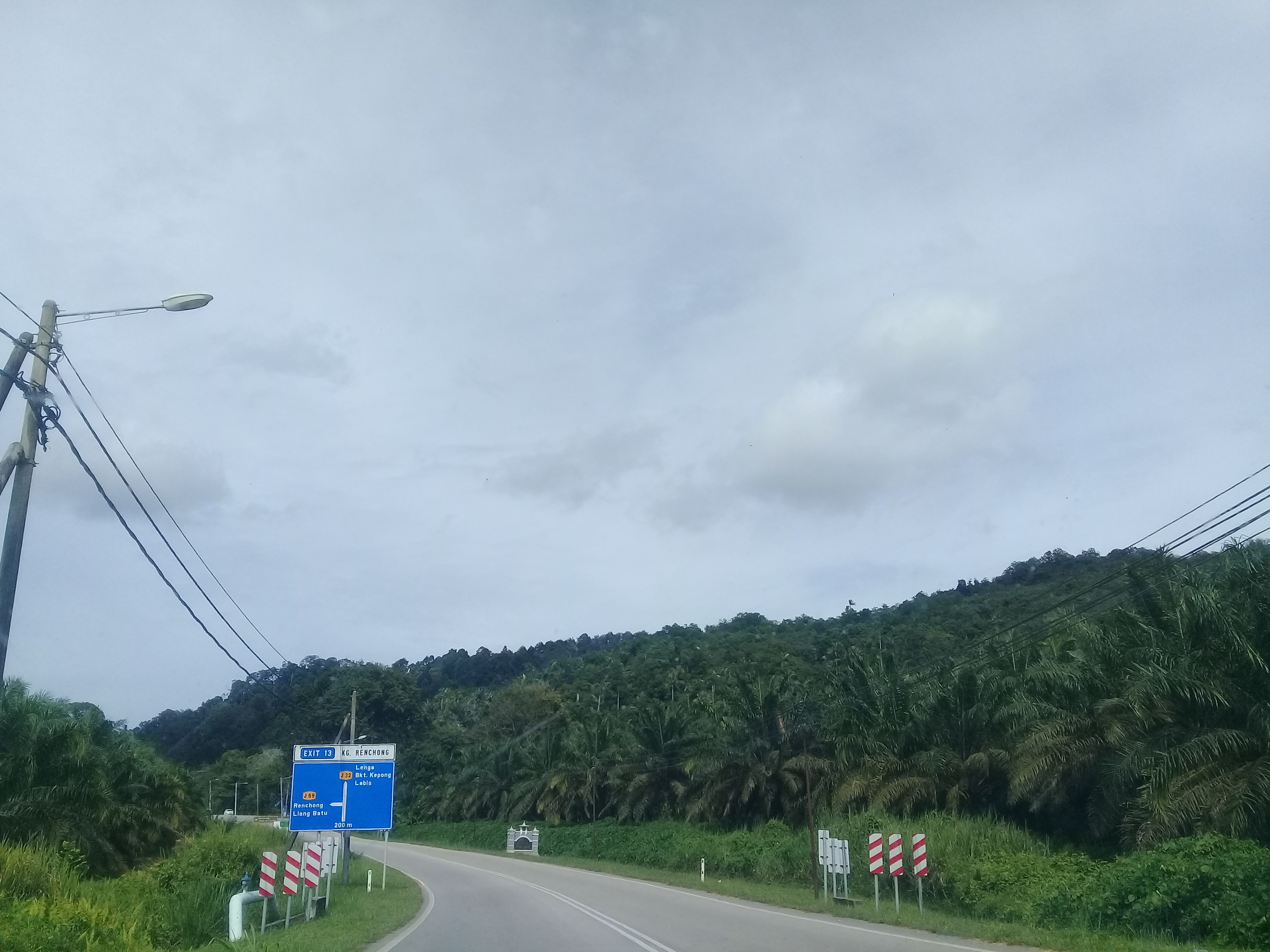
- Kampung Renchong Intersection

Major junctions
- Northwest end: Lenga (West)
- J32 State Route J32; J61 State Route J61
- Southeast end: Lenga (East)

Location
- Country: Malaysia
- Primary destinations: Renchong

Highway system
- Highways in Malaysia; Expressways; Federal; State

Johor State Route J145, Jalan Renchong is a major road in Johor, Malaysia.

== Junction lists ==
The entire route is located in Muar District, Johor.

Legend:

- I/C - Interchange, I/S - Intersection, RSA - Rest and service area, OBR - Overhead bridge restaurant, R/R - Restaurant and rest plaza, L/B - Layby, V/P - Vista point, TN - tunnel, T/P - Toll plaza, BR - Bridge
- C - Cloverleaf, S - Stack, T-A - Trumpet-A, T-B - Trumpet-B, DT - Directional-T/Y, SDT - Semi-Directional-T/Y, P-Y - Partial-Y, D - Diamond, P-C - Partial cloverleaf, D-D - Diverging diamond, D-R - Direct ramp

Location	km	mi	Name	Destinations	Notes
Lenga			Lenga (West)	J32 Johor State Route J32 – Muar, Pagoh, Lenga, Bukit Kepong, Labis; North–South Expressway Southern Route / AH2 – Kuala Lumpur, Johor Bahru	T-junctions
Lenga			Kampung Batang Batu		
Lenga			Renchong		
Lenga			Kampung Renchong Ulu		
Lenga			Kampung Liang Batu	J61 Jalan Kg. Liang Batu Lenga – Kampung Liang Batu	T-junctions
Lenga			Kampung Paya Geronggang		
Lenga			Kampung Gombang		
Lenga			Lenga (East)	J32 Johor State Route J32 – Muar, Pagoh, Lenga, Bukit Kepong, Labis; North–South Expressway Southern Route / AH2 – Kuala Lumpur, Johor Bahru	T-junctions
1.000 mi = 1.609 km; 1.000 km = 0.621 mi
