= Lenga =

Lenga may refer to:

- Nothofagus pumilio, a tree or shrub native to the Andes and also known as lenga beech
- Lenga, Johor, a town in Johor, Malaysia
