= Kepong (disambiguation) =

Kepong may refer to:

- Kepong
- Bukit Kepong, town in Johor, Malaysia
- Kepong (federal constituency), represented in the Dewan Rakyat
- Kepong (state constituency), formerly represented in the Selangor State Legislative Assembly (1959–74)
