= Muar Municipal Council =

Coordinates: 2.047248°N 102.565377°E

Muar Municipal Council Majlis Perbandaran Muar
- Emblem

Type
- Type: Local authority of Muar (town)

History
- Founded: 1 January 2001
- Preceded by: South Muar District Council, Bandar Maharani Town Council, Town Board, Sanitary Board

Leadership
- President: Norrizam Muhamad (since 15 January 2024)
- Secretary: Mohd Faiz Mohd Salleh

Structure
- Seats: 24
- Political groups: Councillors: BN (24): UMNO (13); MCA (8); MIC (3)
- Length of term: 1 April 2024–31 December 2025

Motto
- Cekap, Amanah, Dinamik, Makmur (Efficient, Trustworthy, Dynamic, Prosperous)

Meeting place
- Muar Bypass Building, Muar

Website
- www.mpmuar.gov.my

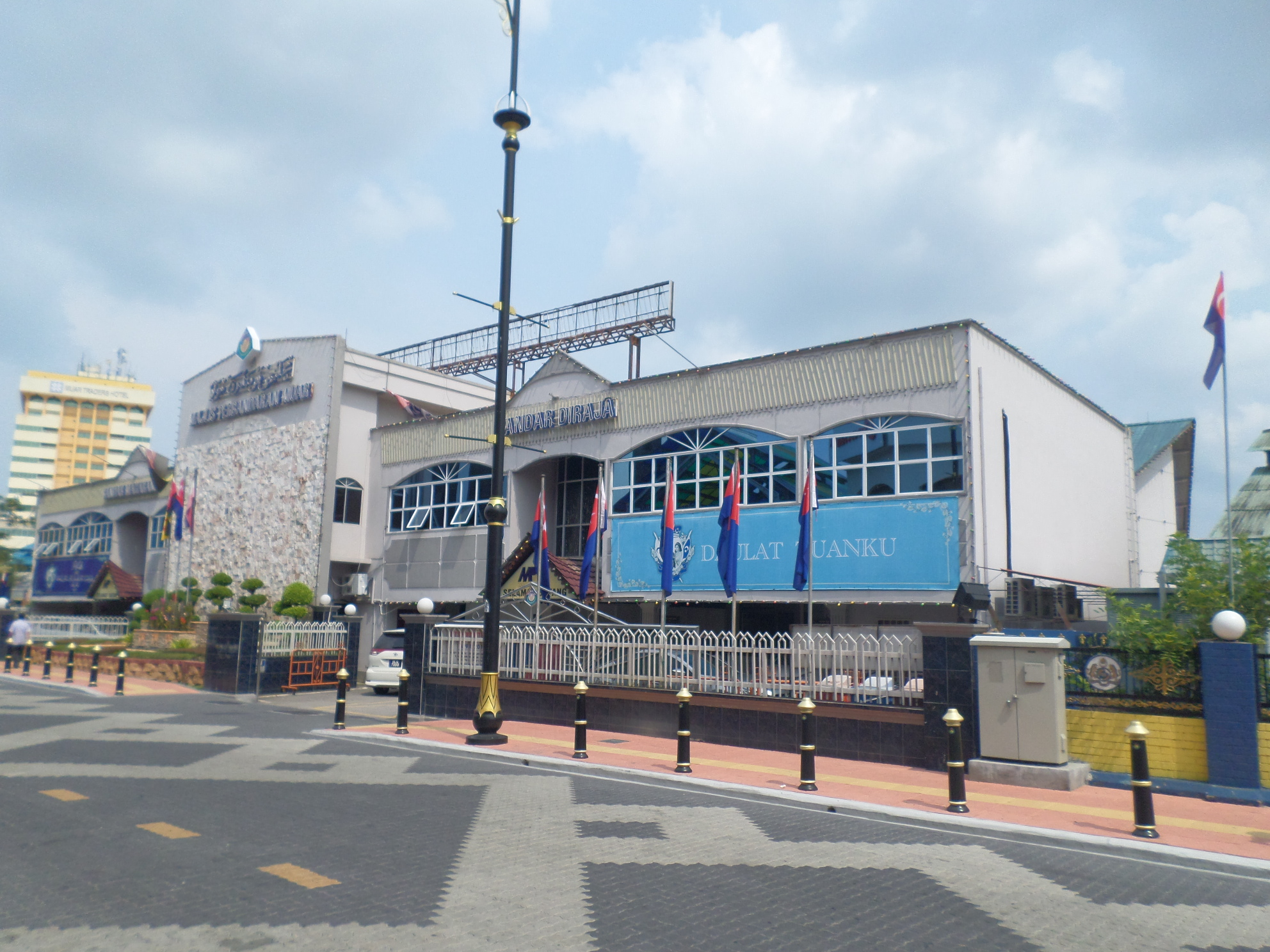
Former headquarters at Karung Berkunci, Jalan Maharani

Muar Municipal Council (Malay: Majlis Perbandaran Muar, abbreviated MPM) is a local authority which administrates Muar Town of Muar District, Johor, Malaysia. This agency is under Johor state government. MPM are responsible for public health and sanitation, waste removal and management, town planning, environmental protection and building control, social and economic development and general maintenance functions of urban infrastructure. The MPM main headquarters is located near Muar Bypass since July 2025, replaced its previous office at Jalan Maharani in the Town's business district.

== History ==
- 1903-1910 : Sanitary Board.
- 1921 : Town Board; under Town Board Enactment 1911).
- 06.03.1952 : Bandar Maharani Town Council (Majlis Bandaran Bandar Maharani); under Local Authorities Ordinance 1973).
- 01.08.1976 : South Muar District Council (Majlis Daerah Muar Selatan); under Local Government Act, Temporary provisions (dibawah Akta Kerajaan Tempatan - peruntukan-peruntukan sementara 1973).
- 01.01.2001 : Muar Municipal Council (Majlis Perbandaran Muar). This agency was granted municipal status in 2001.

=== Emblem history ===
The original emblem of Muar Municipal Council adopted since its establishment on 1 January 2001, consisted of various polygons of different colours including intertwined arrows, a hexagon and a crescent and star. The emblem was slightly modified on 1 January 2018 by replacing the intertwined arrows and the municipal council's motto – Cekap Amanah Dinamik Makmur (Efficient Trustworthy Dynamic Prosperous) in Romanised Malay and its name in Jawi Malay with the flag of Muar District. The Municipal Council's name in Romanised Malay was moved into the blue scroll below the shield from the green arc of the shield, with the Johor State motto in Jawi Kepada Allah Berserah (کفد الله برسراه, To Allah we Surrender) taking its original place. The shield is additionally topped by the Johor Royal Crown and supported on both sides by two Johor State arms tigers.

Emblem of Muar Municipal Council (2001–2018)

Emblem of Muar Municipal Council (2018–present)

== Departments ==
- Management Services (Khidmat Pengurusan)
- Building (Bangunan)
- Enforcement (Penguatkuasaan)
- Finance (Kewangan)
- Valuation And Property Management (Penilaian Dan Pengurusan Harta)
- Development Planning and Landscape (Perancangan Pembangunan dan Lanskap)
- Engineering (Kejuruteraan)
- Social and Corporate Communication (Komunikasi Korporat dan Kemasyarakatan)
- Health and Licensing (Kesihatan dan Perlesenan)

== Units ==
- Law (Undang-undang)
- Internal Audit (Audit Dalam)
- Income And Contract (Perolehan Dan Kontrak)
- One Stop Centre (Pusat Sehenti)
- Commissioner of Building (Pesuruhjaya Bangunan)
- Information Technology (Teknologi Maklumat)

== Administrative areas (zones) ==
As of 2025, Muar is divided into 24 zones represented by 24 councillors to act as mediators between residents and the municipal council. The councillors for the 1 April 2024 to 31 December 2025 session are as below:

Zone	Councillor	Political affiliation
Sungai Balang	Nurul Azreen Md Ishak	UMNO
Seri Menanti	Saifulrudin Muhamad	UMNO
Parit Jawa	Teong Hock Hon	MCA
Parit Bakar A	Zaiton Ismail	UMNO
Parit Bakar B	Choo Chiau Seng	MCA
Town centre A	Azman Yacob	UMNO
Town centre B	Sateesh Rameswaran	MIC
Maharani A	Md Noordin Tamjis	UMNO
Maharani B	Tamilvanan Sundral	MIC
Maharani C	Gan Qi Ru	MCA
Town centre 2A	Eng Chong Yang	MCA
Town centre 2B	Normah Kassim	UMNO
Town centre 2C	Azman Ismail	UMNO
Bakri A	Yee Min Wee	MCA
Bakri B	Hanizarafida Md Sukri	UMNO
Ayer Hitam	Mohd Ghazali Sabari@Atan	UMNO
Sungai Terap A	Nadzirah Yusof	UMNO
Sungai Terap B	Mohd Iqbal Md Yusof	UMNO
Sungai Raya A	Tan Boon Guan	MCA
Sungai Raya B	Ng Kai Guan	MCA
Jorak A	Nagalinggam Kathayarayen	MIC
Jorak B	Tai Chee How	MCA
Lenga	Jamilah Abd Hamid	UMNO
Bukit Kepong	Mohd Noor Taib	UMNO

== See also ==
- Muar (town)
- Muar District
- MP Muar F.C.
