= Bukit Kepong Emergency Gallery =

Conflict memorial gallery in Malaysia

- Galeri Darurat Bukit Kepong
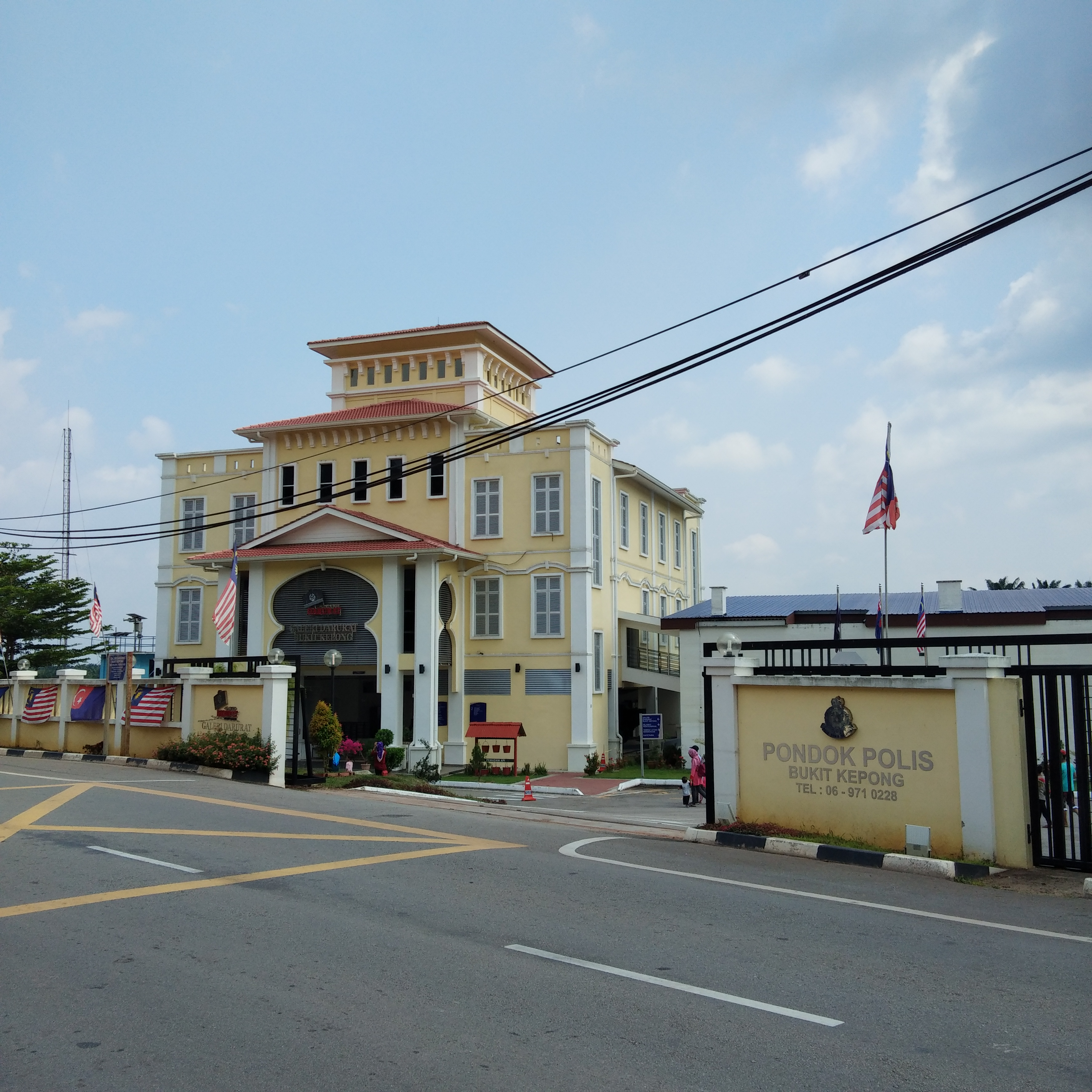
- View of Bukit Kepong Emergency Gallery entrance.
- Established: February 23, 2017
- Location: Bukit Kepong, Muar, Johor, Malaysia
- Collections: Weapons, lockups, barracks, and excavated artifacts used during the incident
- Collection size: 815
- Architect: Hasa Arkitek Sdn Bhd
- Owner: Royal Malaysian Police

The Bukit Kepong Emergency Gallery (Malay: Galeri Darurat Bukit Kepong) is a museum alocated in Bukit Kepong, Muar, Johor, Malaysia. Situated by the banks of the Muar River, it was built as a memorial in honour of the fallen during the 1950 Bukit Kepong incident that took place during the height of the Malayan Emergency.

== History ==
=== Bukit Kepong incident ===
In 1950, an armed standoff occurred between the Federation of Malaya Police and the Malayan National Liberation Army (MNLA), the paramilitary wing of the Malayan Communist Party, in the surrounding area of the remote Bukit Kepong police station. The incident started with a guerrilla assault on the police station by a Communist gunman which left almost all of the police officers stationed there dead. The policemen refused surrendering and held their ground to defend the police station even whist being outnumbered.

==== Reinforcements from nearby villages ====
Nearby villages could hear the conflict in Bukit Kepong. Reinforcements from Kampung Tui were made up of villagers escorted by auxiliary policemen but were ambushed by the Communists. They were forced to retreat but continue to guard Bukit Kepong's parameters. Their presence eased some pressure on Bukit Kepong and the guerilla forces later retreated after setting ablaze the village office and robbing some stores.

Other reinforcements came from Kampung Durian Chondong (now in Tangkak District) who travelled by sampan to provide aid but were also ambushed by Communist forces. Their arrival at 10 a.m. was the first instance of the situation in Bukit Kepong being communicated to outsiders.

==== Aftermath ====
The conflict ended with the deaths of most of the officers stationed there, some of their family members, 2 civilians and 40 Communist forces.

== Design and layout ==
=== Architecture ===
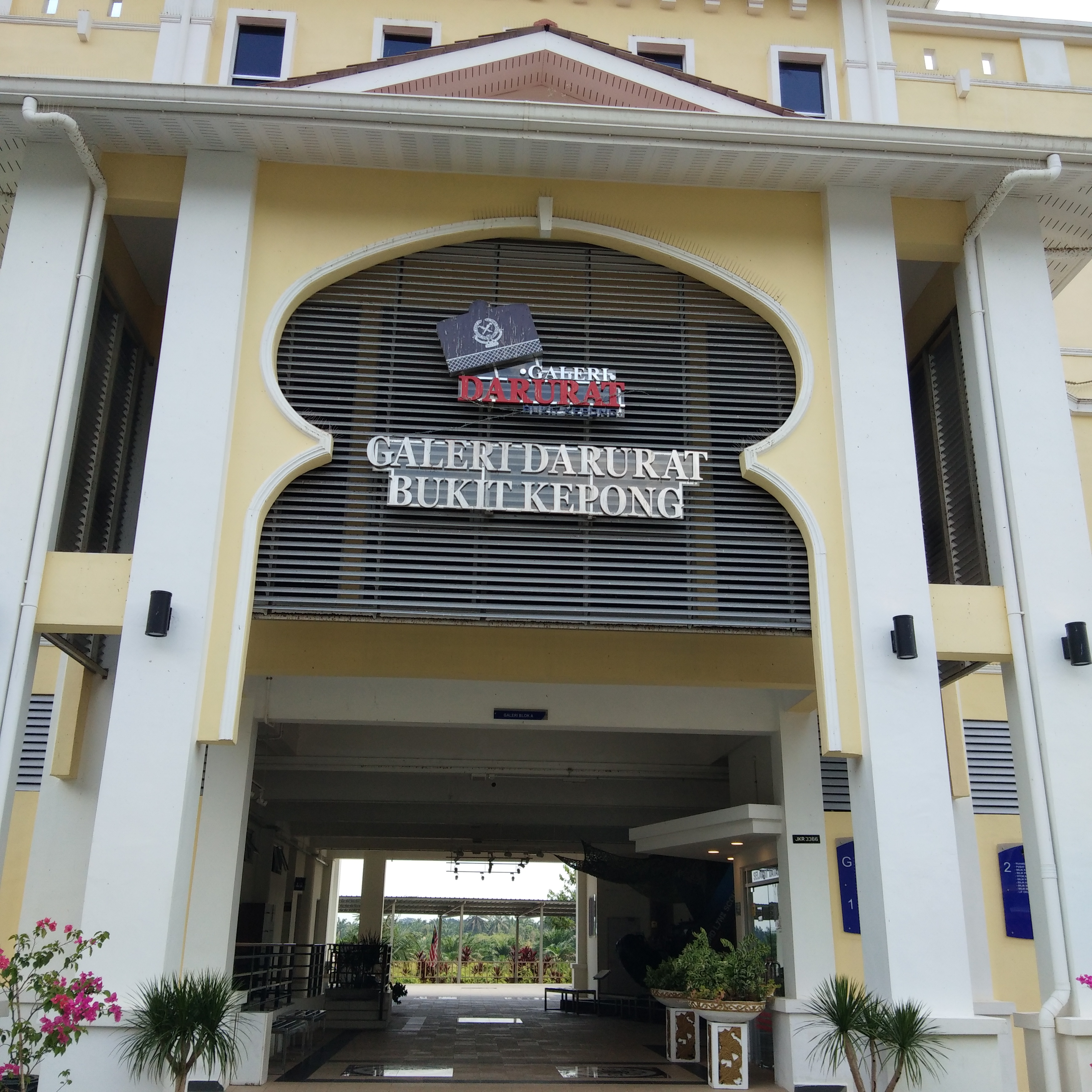
Entrance to Bukit Kepong Gallery

Plans to build the museum were first voiced in 1999. The site of the project was chosen to be at the former location of the police station involved in the Bukit Kepong incident.

Construction of the museum costed RM11.5 million and was separated into three phases. Overall, the gallery has three floors.

The gallery opened on 23 February 2017 during the commemoration of the 67th anniversary of the tragedy. It was officiated by the Sultan of Johor, Sultan Ibrahim. His Majesty was accompanied by the Permaisuri of Johor and their sons. A pantomime was performed during the opening ceremony as a retelling of the incident.

=== Interior and contents ===
The gallery compiles and showcases artifacts used by the police force from all over the country during the Malayan Emergency including firearms, vehicles, uniforms and barracks. Historical films about Bukit Kepong are also played within the gallery.

== Incidents ==
In 2022, the Muar district was hit by the worst flood since 2011 at the time. The ground floor of the gallery suffered major floodings due to the overflowing Muar River. Luckily, most artifacts had been moved to higher floors to prevent damage. It was reported that only two armored cars and a boat located outside the gallery were affected. Even so, a total of RM250,000 was provided to restore any artifacts and historical items that were damaged by the flood.

== Use and recognition ==
An annual commemoration ceremony is held at the gallery since its completion as a memorial to the Bukit Kepong incident. It is held in conjunction with the Police Day celebration in Bukit Kepong.

== Photo gallery ==
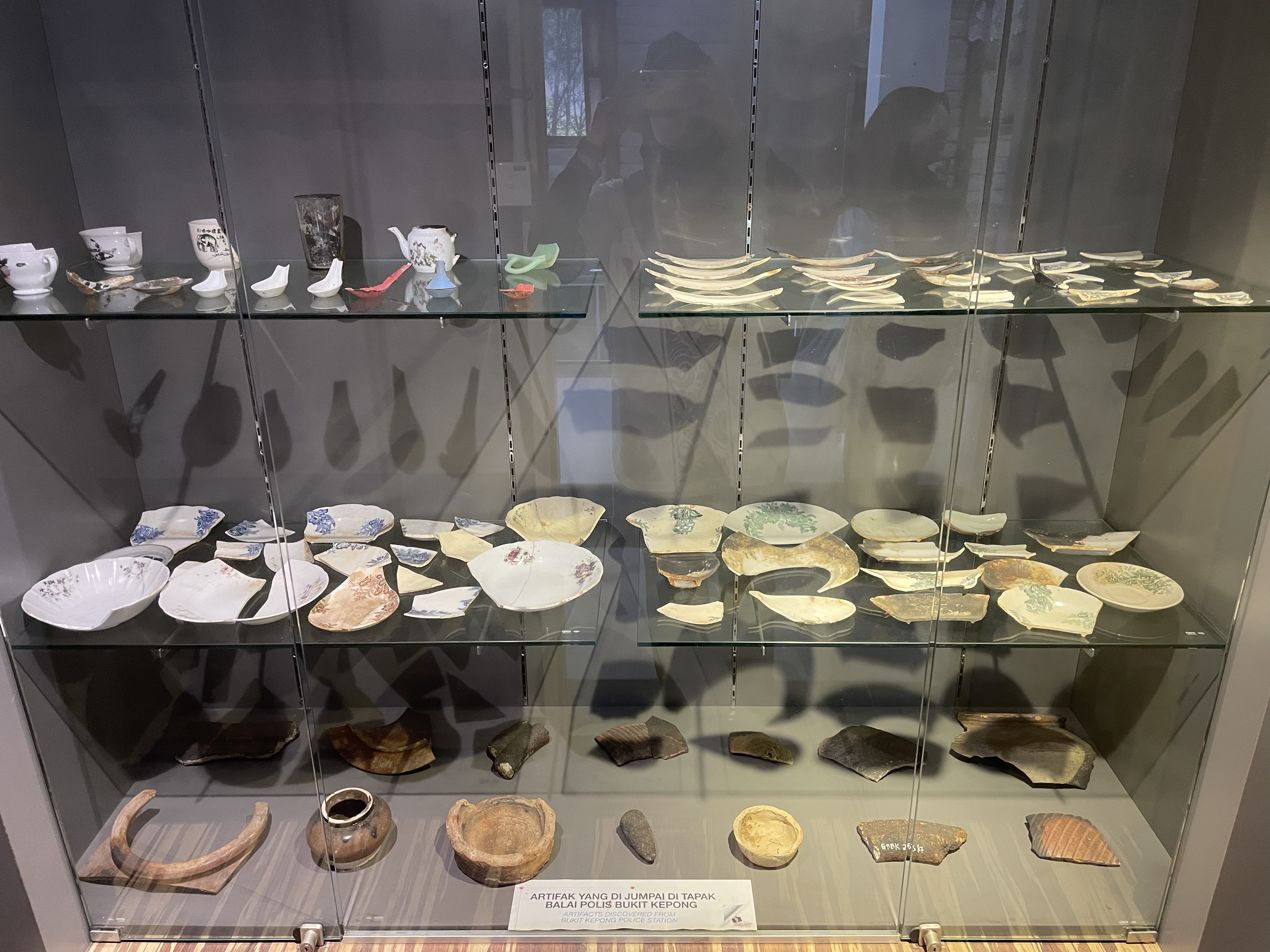
Broken china and pottery discovered in situ at the site of the original Bukit Kepong police station

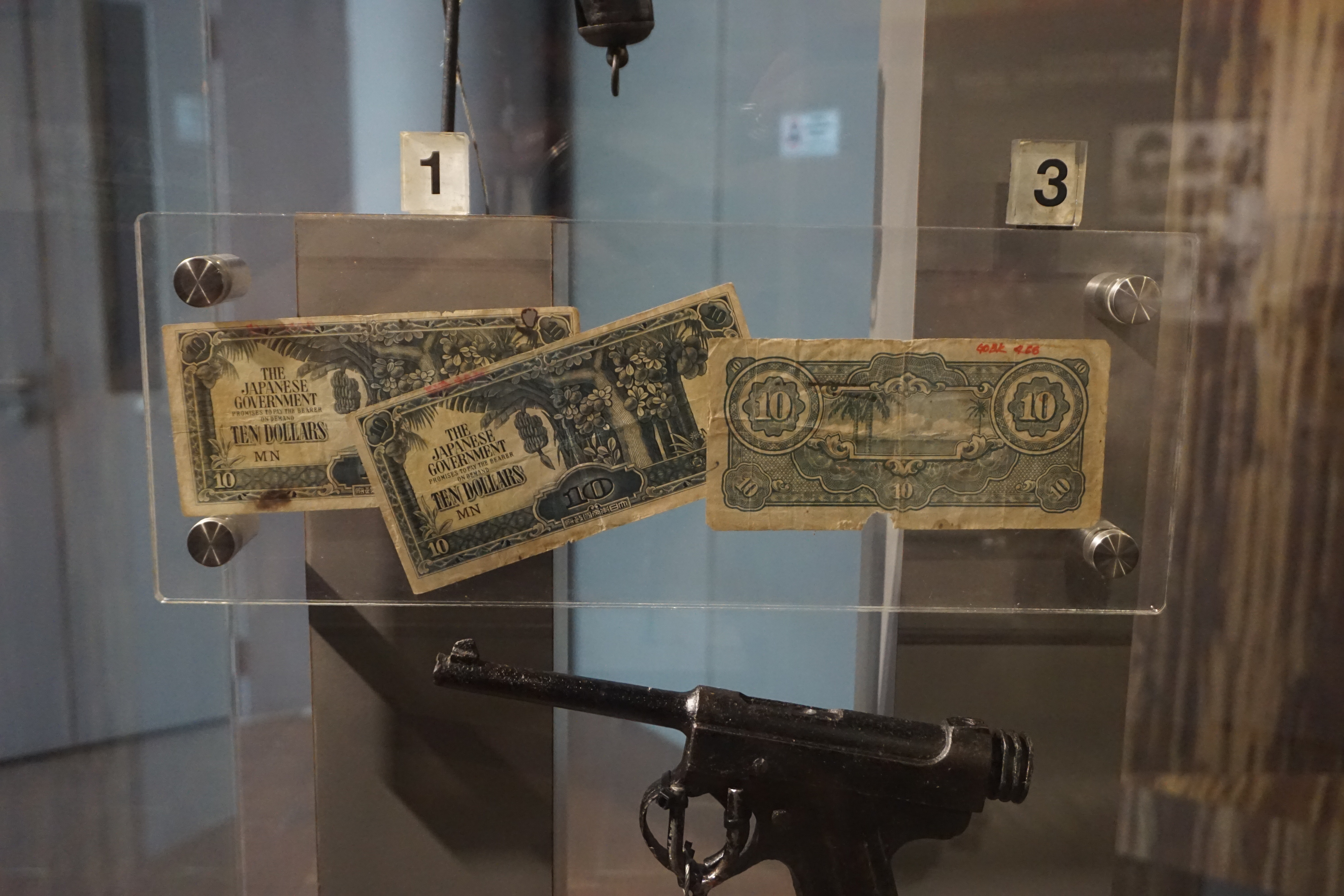
Japanese-issued "banana money" and handgun

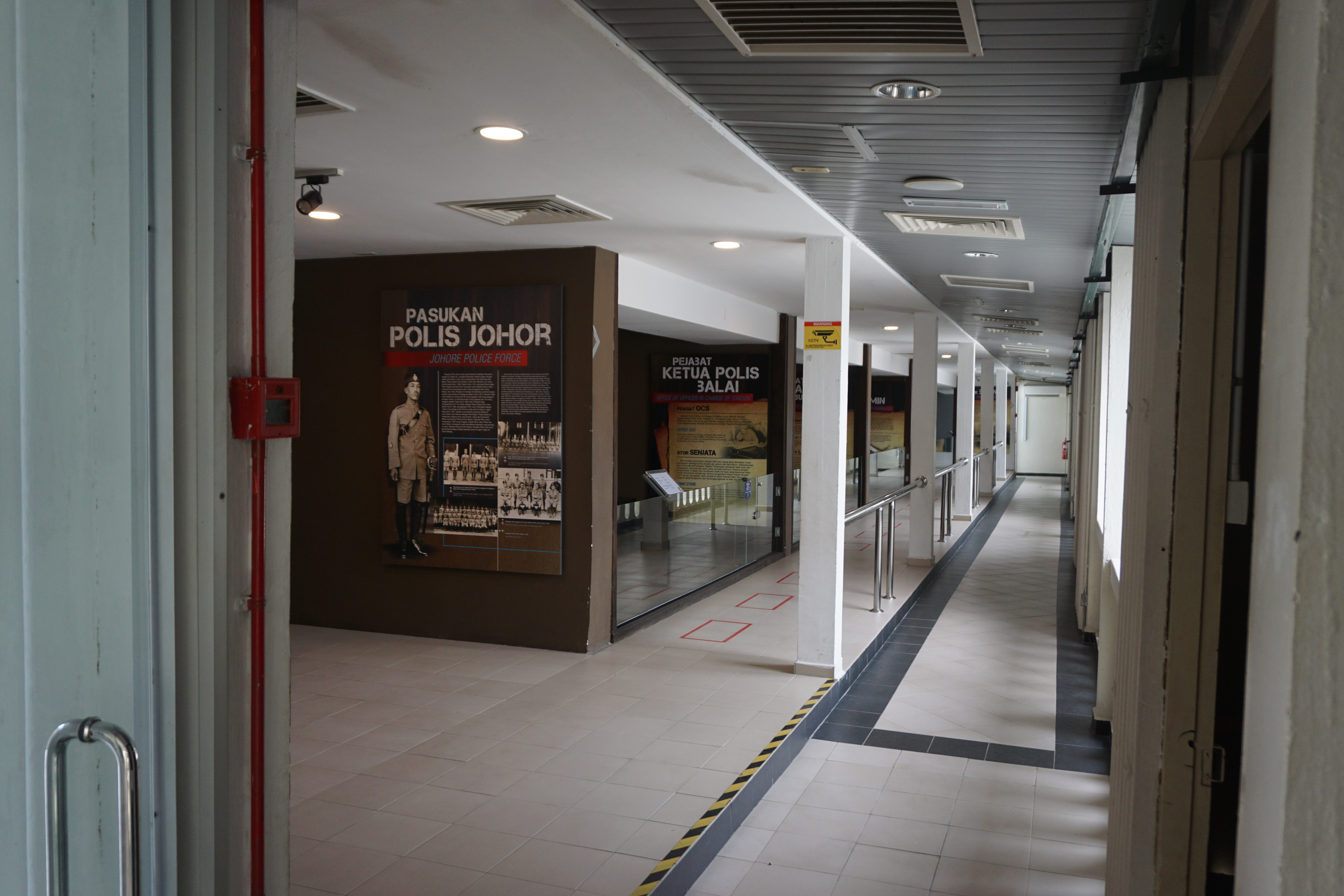
Dioramas

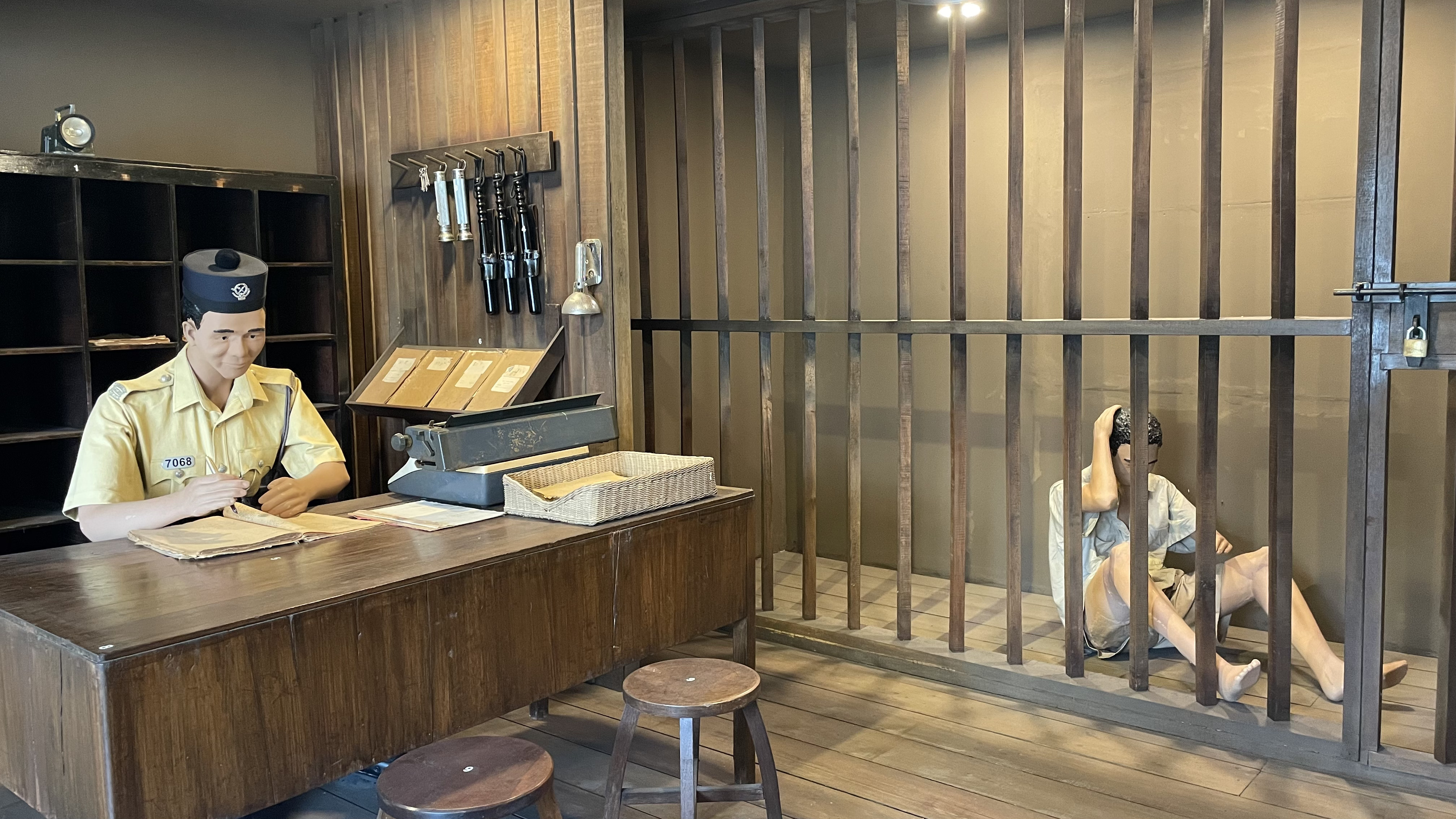
One of the dioramas in the Emergency Gallery, depicting a scene in the station office and jail cell with an incarcerated person

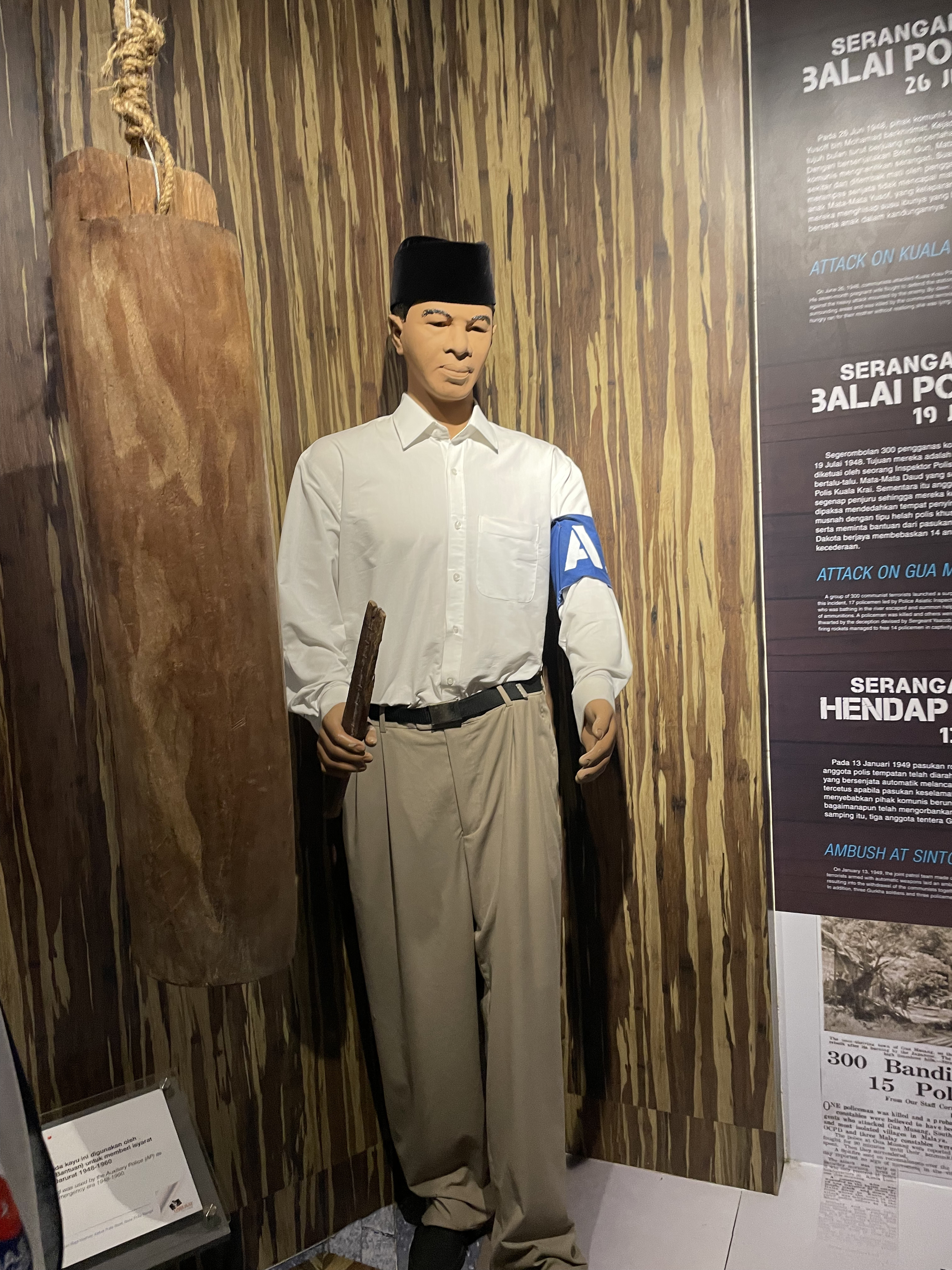
A mannequin in auxiliary police outfit

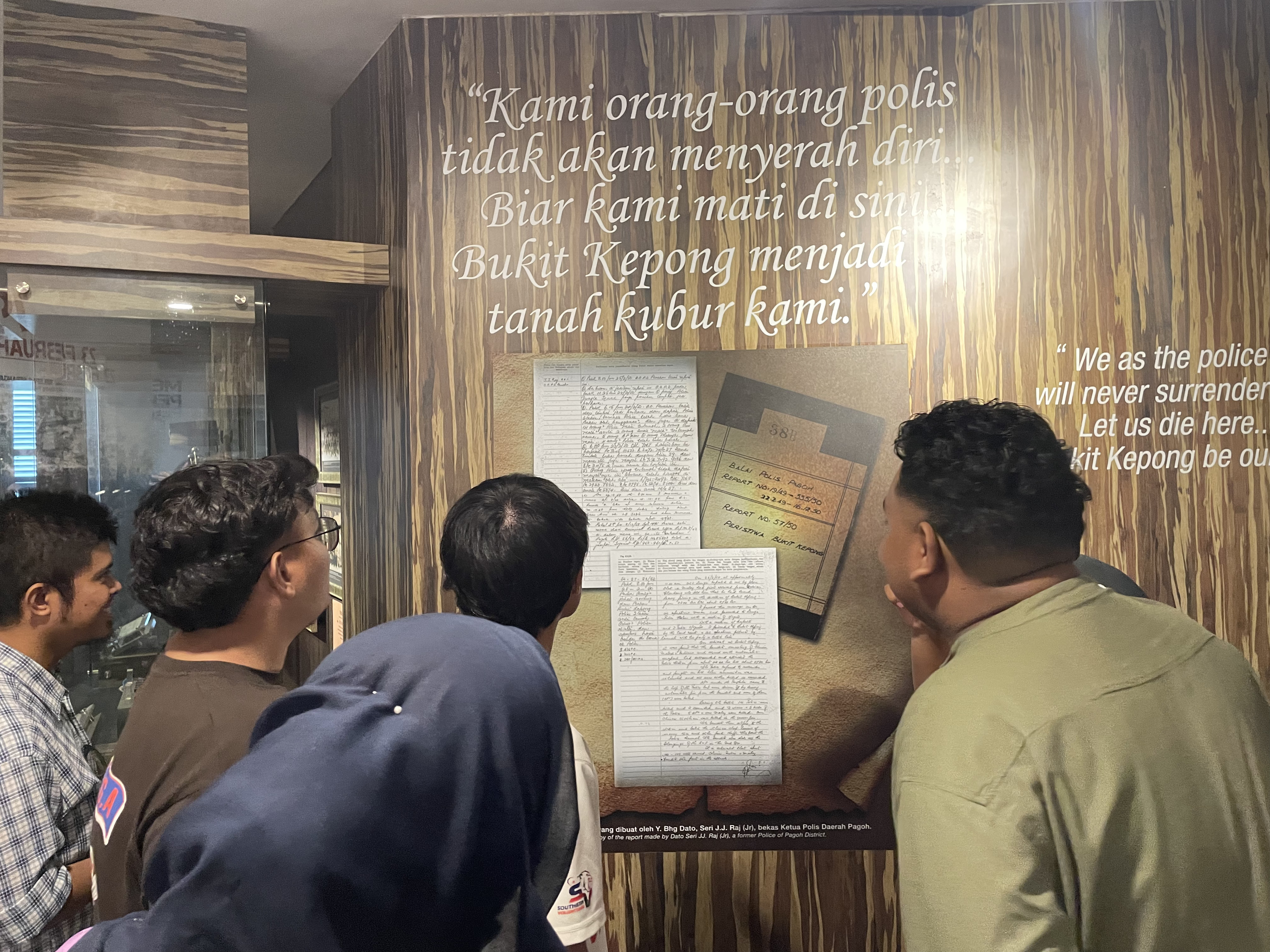
Visitors examining an exhibit in the Emergency Gallery, featuring a famous line from the 1981 film

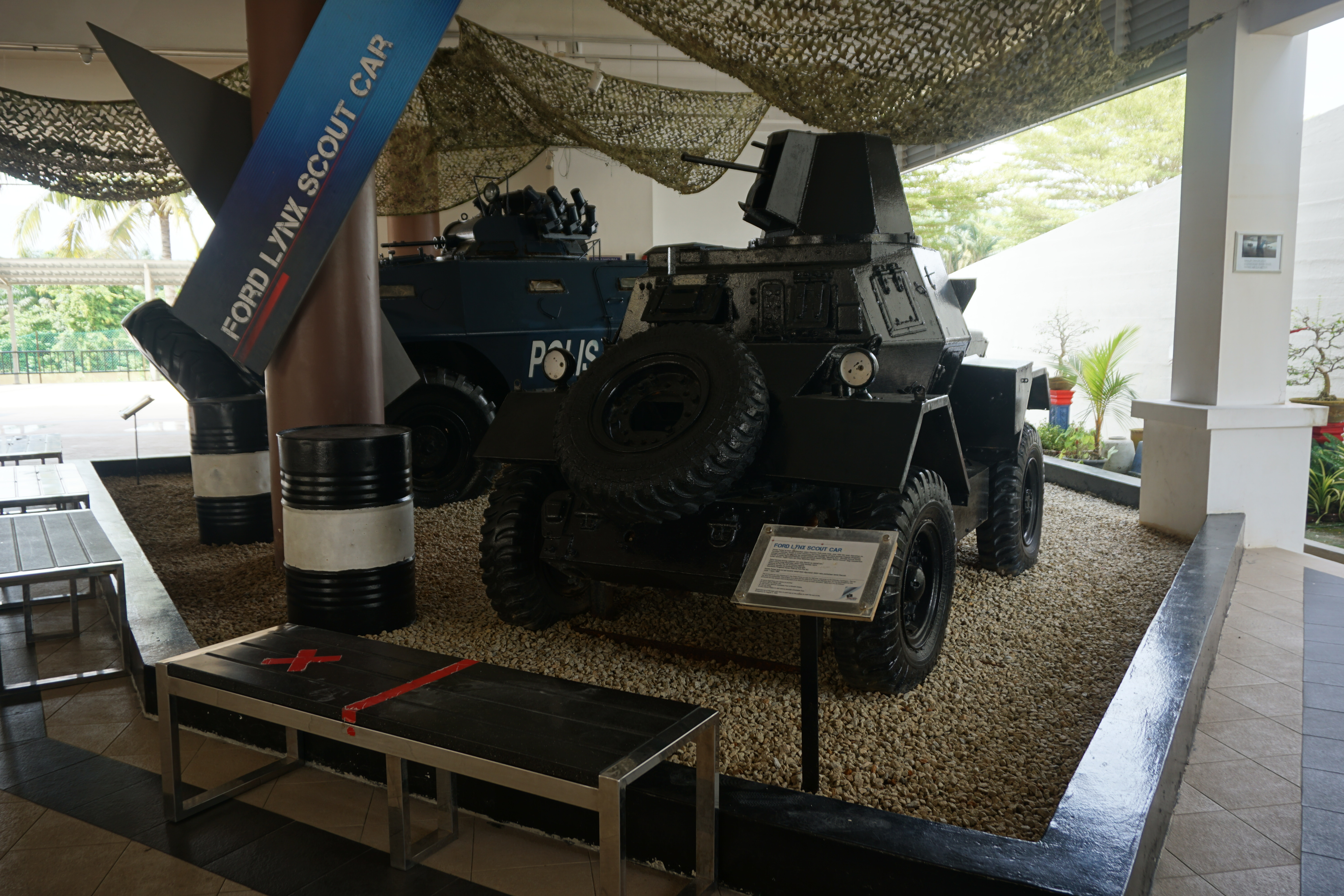
Ford Lynx used by the Federation of Malaya Police, displayed outside
