= Pagoh University Town =

Coordinates: 2.1346654°N 102.7324268°E

Pagoh University Town Bandar Universiti Pagoh
- University township
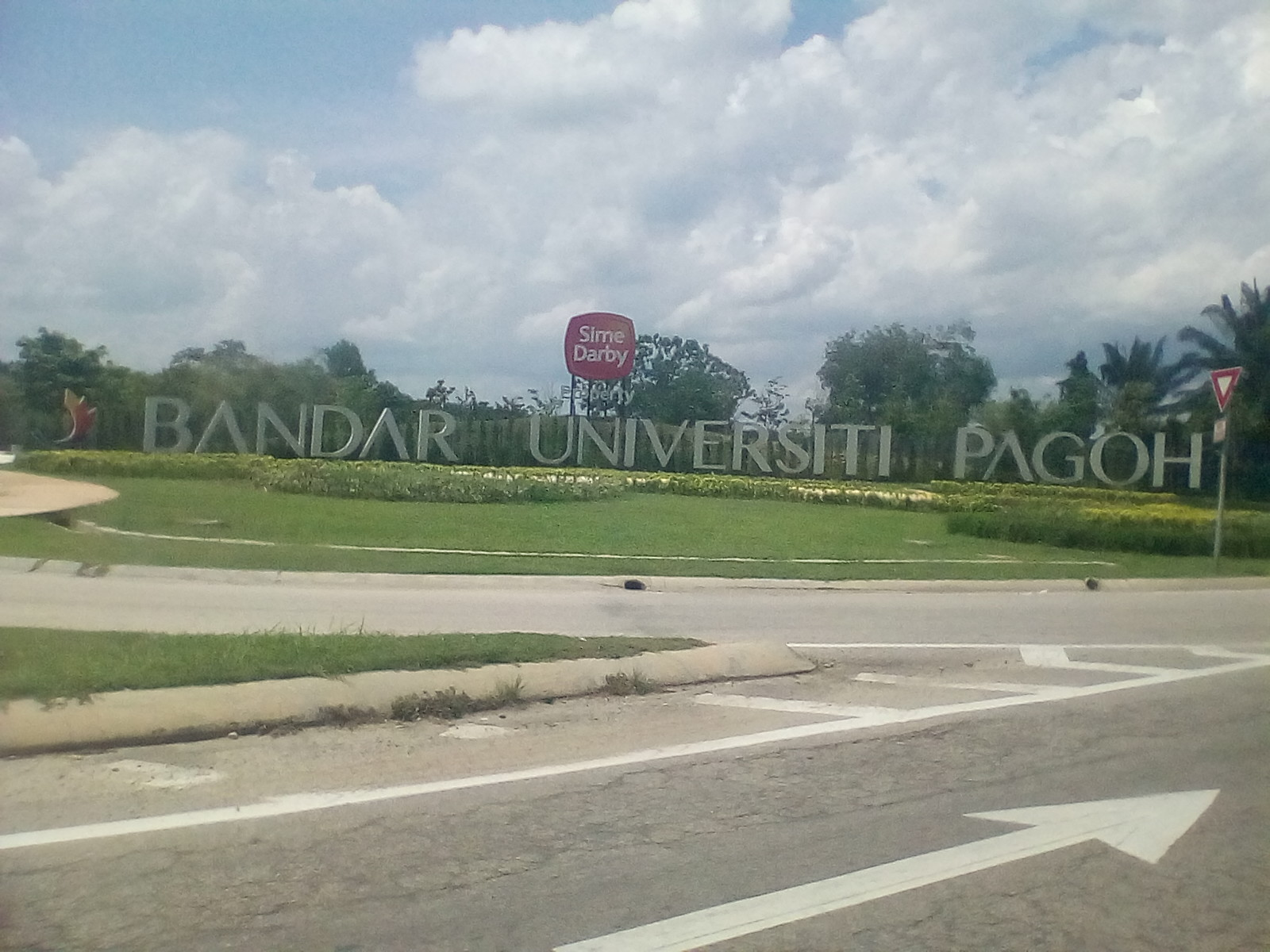
- Bandar Universiti Pagoh sign
- Interactive map of Pagoh University Town
- Country: Malaysia
- State: Johor
- District: Muar
- Constituency: Pagoh

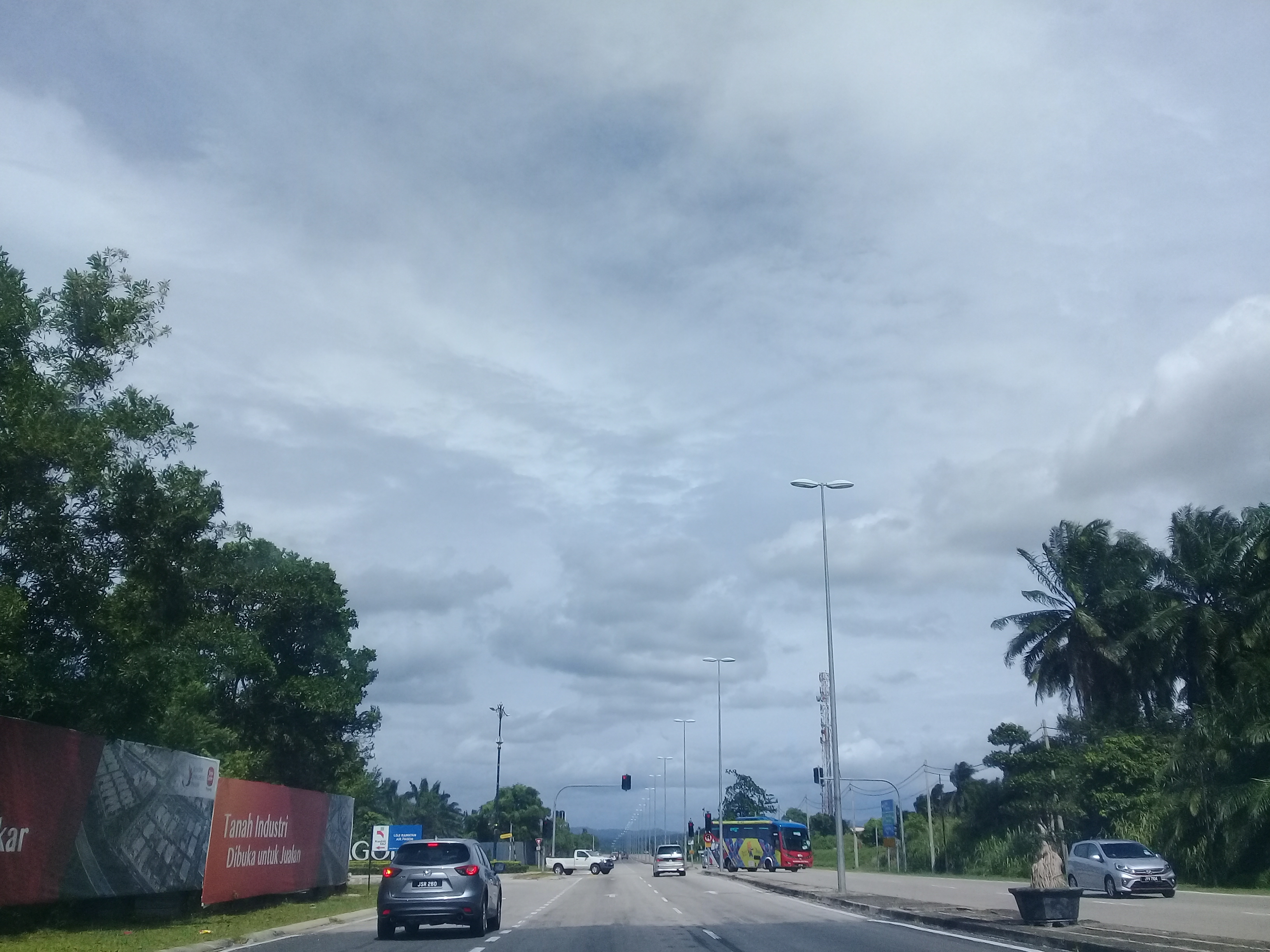
Pagoh University Town intersection at Jalan Muar–Labis (part of Johor State Highway J32)

The Pagoh University Town (Malay: Bandar Universiti Pagoh; Jawi: بندر اونيۏرسيتي ڤاڬوه; Chinese: 巴莪大学城) is a new township built around the Pagoh Education Hub (EduHub Pagoh) and is partly developed by Sime Darby Property in Pagoh, Muar District, Johor, Malaysia. It is located next to Pagoh Interchange on the North-South Expressway (NSE) and 20 minutes drive away to the royal town of Muar.

== Pagoh educational hub ==
The Pagoh Higher Education Hub (HPTP; Malay: Hab Pendidikan Tinggi Pagoh; Jawi: هب ڤنديديقن تيڠڬي ڤاڬوه) is located in Pagoh University Town and stands as the country's first and largest public higher education hub.

The concept for the university town of Pagoh drew inspiration from similar international models, such as Qatar Education City and the Science and Technology Park (Qatar Education City). This initiative was championed by Y.A.B. Tan Sri Dato’ Dr. Muhyiddin Muhammad Yassin during his tenure as the 10th Deputy Prime Minister of Malaysia, with operations anticipated to commence in mid-2016.

The development of the Higher Education Hub began on June 24, 2011, following approval from the Cabinet Council. The project was executed through a Private Fund Initiative (PFI-BLMT). The Inauguration and Groundbreaking Ceremony was officiated by Y.A.B. Tan Sri Dato’ Dr. Muhyiddin Muhammad Yassin, who was then the Deputy Prime Minister and Minister of Education of Malaysia, at Ladang Lanadron, Panchor, Muar, Johor, on September 15, 2011.

The University Development Master Plan for HPTP was designed to support the objectives of the participating public universities and polytechnics, with a focus on development and projections spanning the next 10 to 20 years.

HPTP spans over 200 hectares and hosts four educational institutions, including three public universities and a polytechnic

The variety of core studies offered by these institutions, with an estimated student population of 7,500, has significantly boosted the socioeconomics of the surrounding area.

== List of universities and polytechnic ==
- Universiti Teknologi Malaysia (ICA Research Centre)
- International Islamic University Malaysia (South Campus)
- Universiti Tun Hussein Onn (Pagoh Campus)
- Politeknik Tun Syed Nasir Ismail

== Shared Facilities Components ==
The shared facilities at the Pagoh Higher Education Hub are managed by the Seksyen Projek Khas Hab Pendidikan Tinggi Pagoh, Bahagian Pembangunan, Ministry of Higher Education. These facilities are designed for the use of public university and polytechnic residents, as well as the local community.

The facility is divided into three main zones:

- Zone 1: Includes a convention hall, auditorium hall, and multipurpose Hall.
- Zone 2: Features a Shared Facilities Library, data centre, surau, cafeteria, and guest house.
- Zone 3: Comprises a sports stadium, Track & Field, futsal complex, and aquatic centre

Outdoor sports facilities:

- Track & Field
- Football
- Hockey
- Rugby
- Lawn bowl
- Tennis
- Netball
- Basketball
- Volleyball
- Sepak takraw

Indoor sports facilities:

- Futsal
- Basketball
- Badminton
- Ping pong

Convention center:

- Area: 1,807 m²
- Capacity: 1,000 people
- Includes dressing rooms for curricular and co-curricular activities

Multipurpose halls:

- Three main halls, with two designated as examination halls for 1,000 students
- Basketball court
- Four badminton courts

Auditorium hall:

- Two lecture halls with a capacity of 500 people each
- Four lecture halls with a capacity of 250 people each
- Six business spaces

Shared facilities library building:

- Area: 4,000 m²
- Houses the Shared Facilities Library, internet access facilities, multifunctional spaces, Data Center, and Cafeteria

Surau Gunasama:

- Capacity: 200 worshipers

Kindergarten:

- Area: 629 m²
- Capacity: 50 children

Guest bouse:

- Area: 2,945 m²
- Features 60 room units of various types

Sports Stadium:

- Capacity: 1,000 people
- Includes tracks and field

Futsal complex:

- Four indoor futsal courts

Aquatic Center:

- Includes swimming pools and a diving pool

== Point of Interest ==
Lake Laguna Pagoh

Lake Laguna Pagoh is a 90-acre lake, recognized as the largest man-made lake in northern Johor. It hosts the Majlis Sukan Negeri Johor Canoe and was an international canoe venue in 2023.

For more information, refer to the Johor International Canoe Championship and Johor International Canoe Championship Facebook page.

== Transportation ==
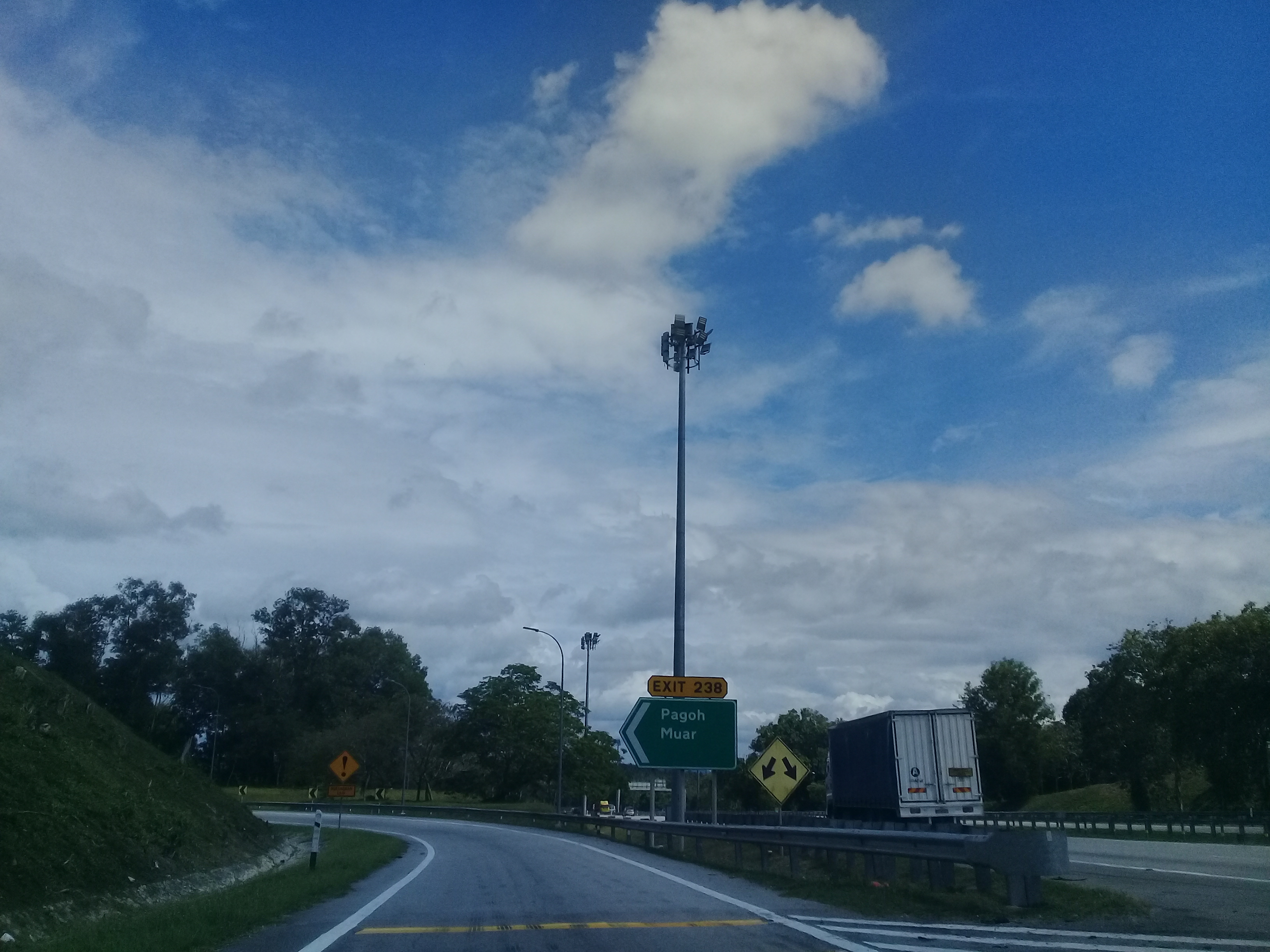
Entering Pagoh Intercahnge from southbound of North–South Expressway

Exit 238 of Pagoh Interchange (Persimpangan Pagoh) at North–South Expressway Southern Route serves Pagoh University Town.

The area is accessible by Bas Muafakat Johor bus route MU-004 (Terminal Maharani Muar–Pagoh).

== See also ==
- Pagoh
- Muar (town)
- Malaysian national projects
