= Bukit Pasir =

Coordinates: 2°06′N 102°38′E

- township
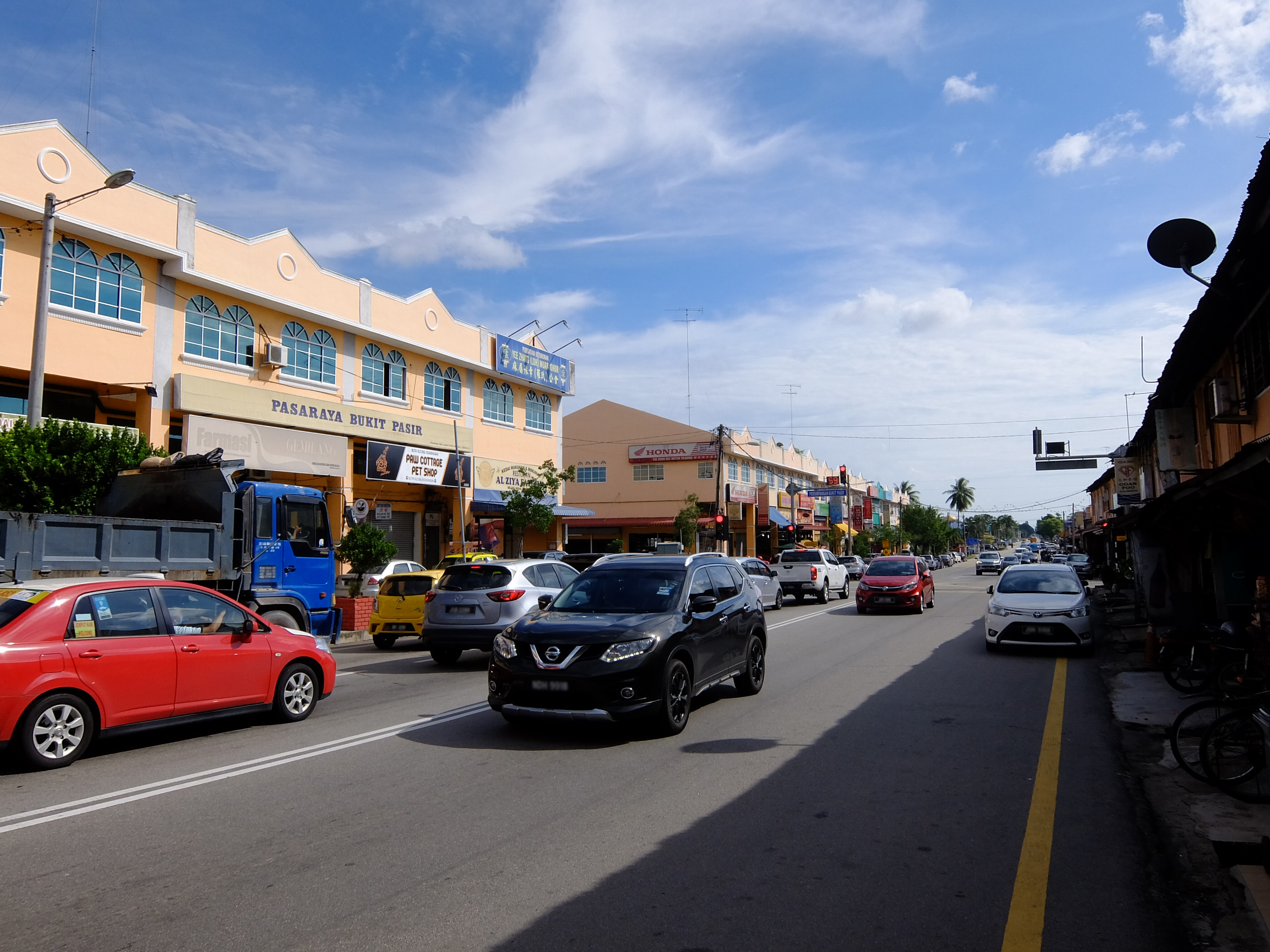
- Interactive map of Bukit Pasir
- Country: Malaysia
- State: Johor
- District: Muar
- Constituency: Pagoh

Bukit Pasir (Jawi: بوكيت ڤاسير; Chinese: 武吉巴西) is a small town in Muar District, Johor, Malaysia. Chinese is the majority ethnic group in this town and follow by Malays and Indians.

Bukit Pasir is a small town between Muar and Pagoh. It is about 15 km (9.3 mi) from Muar Town. Besides that, it located in a vital communication line for Muar to go to Pagoh, Panchor, Lenga and Bukit Kepong. Furthermore, it is only 11 km (6.8 mi) away from the North-South Expressway, Pagoh Toll Exit. You may pass through this town from Muar along the route J32 to go to Labis or turn to route 1 to Segamat.

A national elementary school (SK Bukit Pasir), a national type (Chinese) elementary school (SRJK(C) Yu Jern)(Chinese: 育人華文小學), a national type (Tamil ) elementary school (Sekolah Jenis Kebangsaan (T) Ladang Temiang Renchong) தேமியாங் ரஞ்சோங் தேசிய தமிழ்ப்பள்ளி and a national secondary school (SMK Bukit Pasir) were located in Bukit Pasir Town.

The major economics activities here were agriculture, and also have some simple industrial activity, which focus on furniture making. The famous listed company-Pohuat was here, and also some SME size food factory- Cawan Mas Coffee and Tatawa biscuit.

== Etymology ==
According to the circulating, the name Bukit Pasir, is come from the early years, when residents in Jorak want to go to Muar town they will pass through a sand hill, where now they called it as Bukit Pasir (Sand Hill). There is an old Datuk Gong Temple that was established in 1916, called Hock Siew Kong Temple (麻坡武吉巴西头条福寿宫).

There is another temple known as Kian Nam Shee Temple (峇株吧辖建南寺), which is considered as a prominent local landmark in Bukit Pasir.

== Administration ==
Bukit Pasir of Muar is administered by Muar Municipal Council (MPM) (formerly South Muar Town Council, later Muar Town Council) under the Muar District Office. However, cars park here still no need a parking coupon.

== Transportation and facility ==
Here have a medium size government clinic, police station, small size library, and banks. A vegetable market (pasar) was located at Taman Bintang Emas in Bukit Pasir. In addition, Mayang Sari (Bus Service Provider) was provided bus service for residents here to go to Muar Town, Pagoh, Panchor, Lenga, Bukit Kepong and so on.

== Education ==
Residents can complete their study from kindergarten to secondary school here. The following were some school:

=== Elementary schools ===
- SJK (C) Aik Ming (益民国民型华文小学)
- SJK (C) Chung Hwa Jorak (武吉巴西头条中华国民型华文小学)
- SK Jorak
- SJK (C) Kim Kee (金枝国民型华文小学 )
- SK Paya Panjang
- SK Sri Bukit Pasir
- SK Sungai Raya
- Sekolah Agama Sungai Raya Bukit Pasir
- SJK (C) Wee Sin (维新国民型华文小学 )
- SJK (C) Yu Jern (育人国民型华文小学)
- Sekolah Jenis Kebangsaan (T) Ladang Temiang Renchong (தேமியாங் ரஞ்சோங் தேசிய தமிழ்ப்பள்ளி)

=== Secondary school ===
- SMK Bukit Pasir
