= Kota Buruk =

Historic site in Malaysia

Kota Buruk, literally meaning "Fort of Ruins" in Malay, is a historic site believed to be located at today's Kampung Tanjung Selabu, Jorak, Sungai Terap, Bukit Pasir, Pagoh, Muar, Johor, Malaysia. This site purportedly said to be identified as the original Kota Buruk location and is being preserved as a historic place for the public to visit. Nearby, another historic site, the fort of Biawak Busuk, is believed to be located.

This fort and Biawak Busuk are two historical sites in ancient Malacca's history which Parameswara opened during his stop over and stay in Pagoh, Muar when exiled from Temasik, before his move to Malacca and open the Malacca sultanate empire.

There are a few sources of history records regarding these events, as follows:

- João de Barros wrote in 1553 in his 2nd Décadas da Ásia ("Decades of Asia"), a history of the Portuguese in India and Asia that Parameswara (Paramicura) who were driven away from Temasik after he killed the representative of the King of Siam, Temagi, had escaped in exile and stopped in Muar and built in rural areas of Muar called Pagoh.
- Tun Sri Lanang: Shellabear version: In the Sejarah Melayu or Malay Annals states that Temasik during the reign of Parameswara (Sultan Iskandar Shah) was defeated by Majapahit Kingdom. But he and his family including his followers had fled to Pagoh, Muar and opened two areas on the banks of the Muar River; Biawak Busuk and build a fort called Kota Buruk before moved to and opened up Melaka. In 1488, Malacca Sultan Alauddin Riayat Shah (1477–1488) has died and buried in Pagoh, Ulu Muar.
- Tomé Pires (Suma Oriental): This source highlighted the emergence of Parameswara replacing his father, Raja Sam Agi as the ruler of Palembang who had opened Malacca. He was attacked by the King of Java, Batara Tamavill for declaring himself as 'Mjeura'(those who dare) and fled to Temasik (Singapore). After killing Siamese King of Ayutthaya representative, Temagi there, he secretly ruled Temasik for five years. But fearing the revenge attacked by the King of Ayutthaya, he fled to Pagoh, Muar with his 1,000 followers and lived there for six years when the Seletar peoples were still occupying Malacca.
