= Bukit Kepong =

Administrative region in Johor, Malaysia

Coordinates: 2°21′N 102°50′E

- Mukim
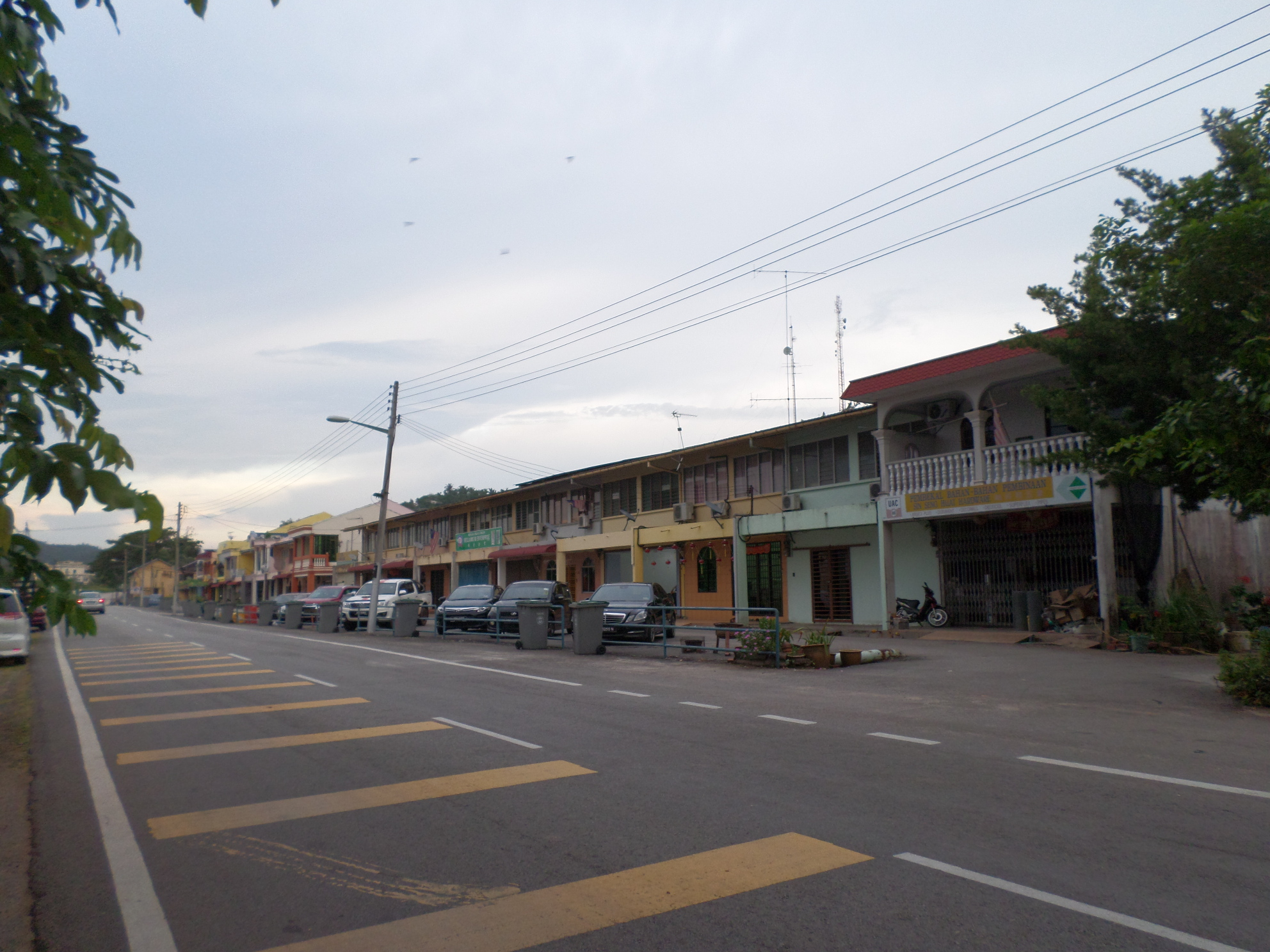
- State Route J32, Bukit Kepong
- Interactive map of Bukit Kepong
- Country: Malaysia
- State: Johor
- District: Muar

Area
  - Total: 256 km^{2} (99 sq mi)

Population
  - Total: 10,174
  - Density: 39.7/km^{2} (103/sq mi)

Bukit Kepong in Muar District

Bukit Kepong is a mukim in Muar District, Johor, Malaysia. It is located near the Muar River.

== History ==
The town is infamous for the tragic Bukit Kepong Incident. The government has built a museum at the site of the original police station to commemorate the heroic actions of the Bukit Kepong police force against the Malayan National Liberation Army (MNLA). Situated near the Muar River, the museum is opened everyday except on Mondays, with an inexpensive entrance fee. Visitors will get a chance to experience the history of the Bukit Kepong incident through its modern and interactive display galleries.

== Geography ==
Bukit Kepong spreads over 256 km^{2} of land with a population of 10,174 people. It is situated right opposite Durian Chondong in Tangkak District, right across the Muar River.

== Education ==
=== Primary school ===
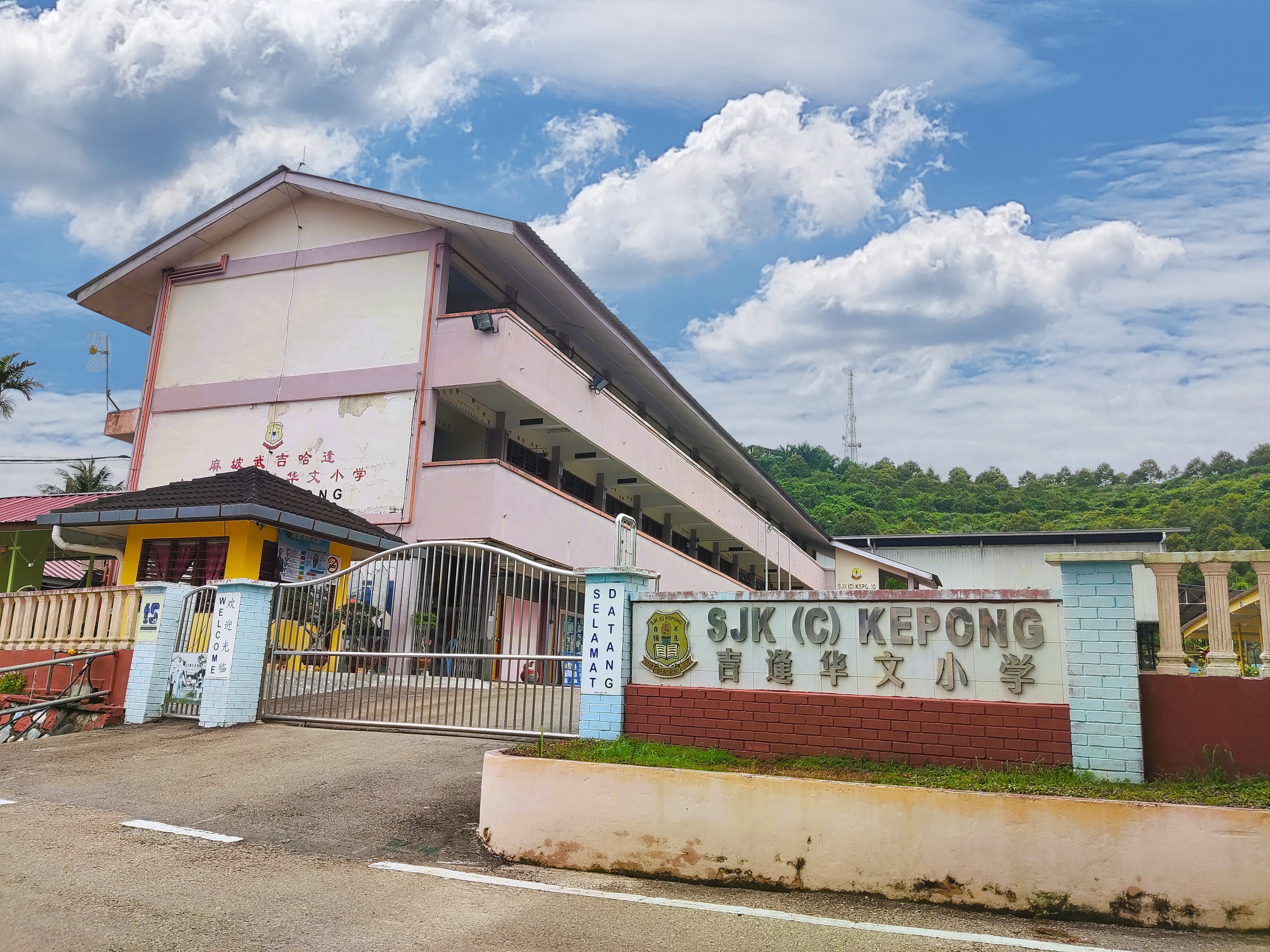
SJK (C) Kepong

- Sekolah Kebangsaan Durian Chondong
- Sekolah Kebangsaan Bukit Kepong
- Sekolah Jenis Kebangsaan (Cina) Kepong

== Gallery ==
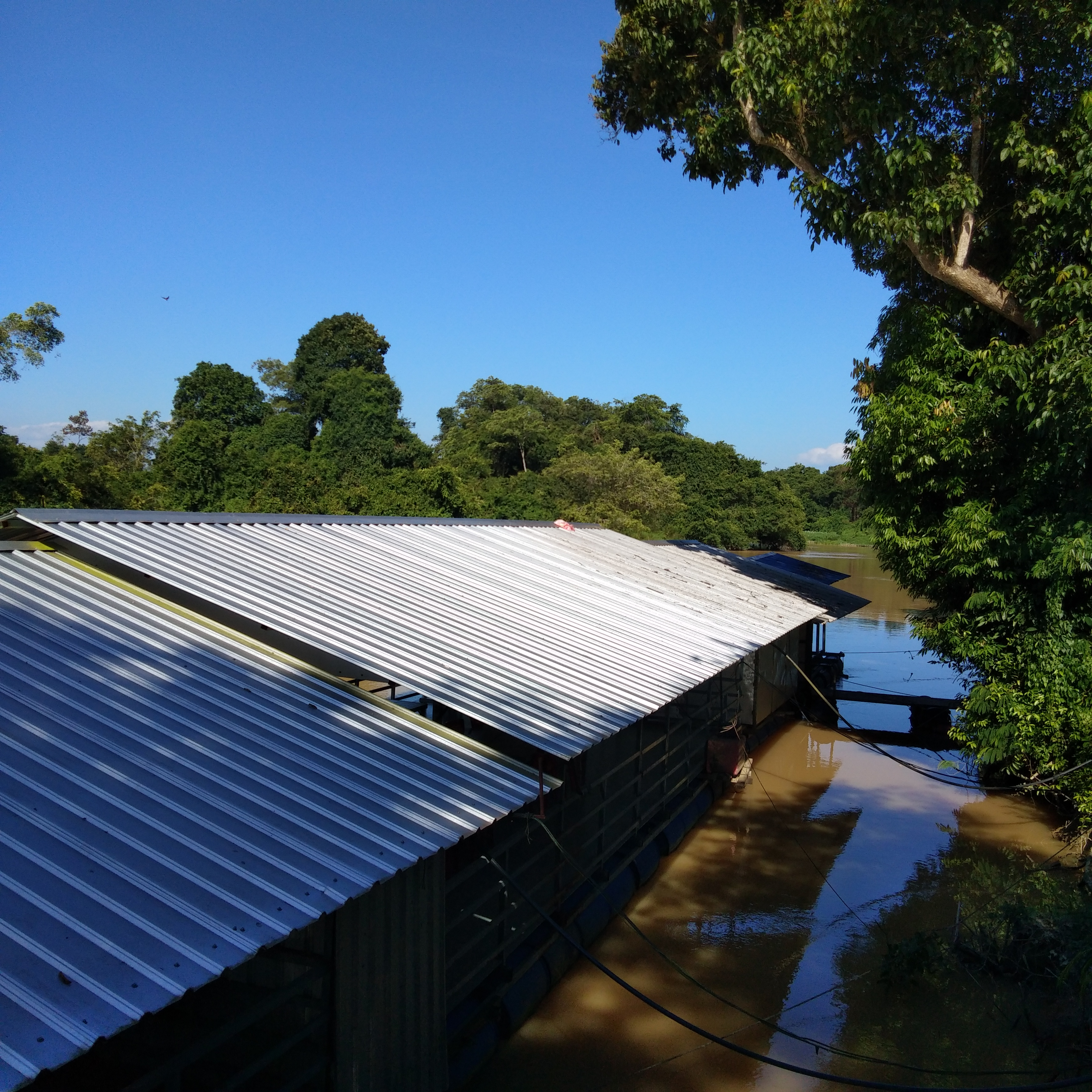
A floating restaurant on the Muar River, Bukit Kepong

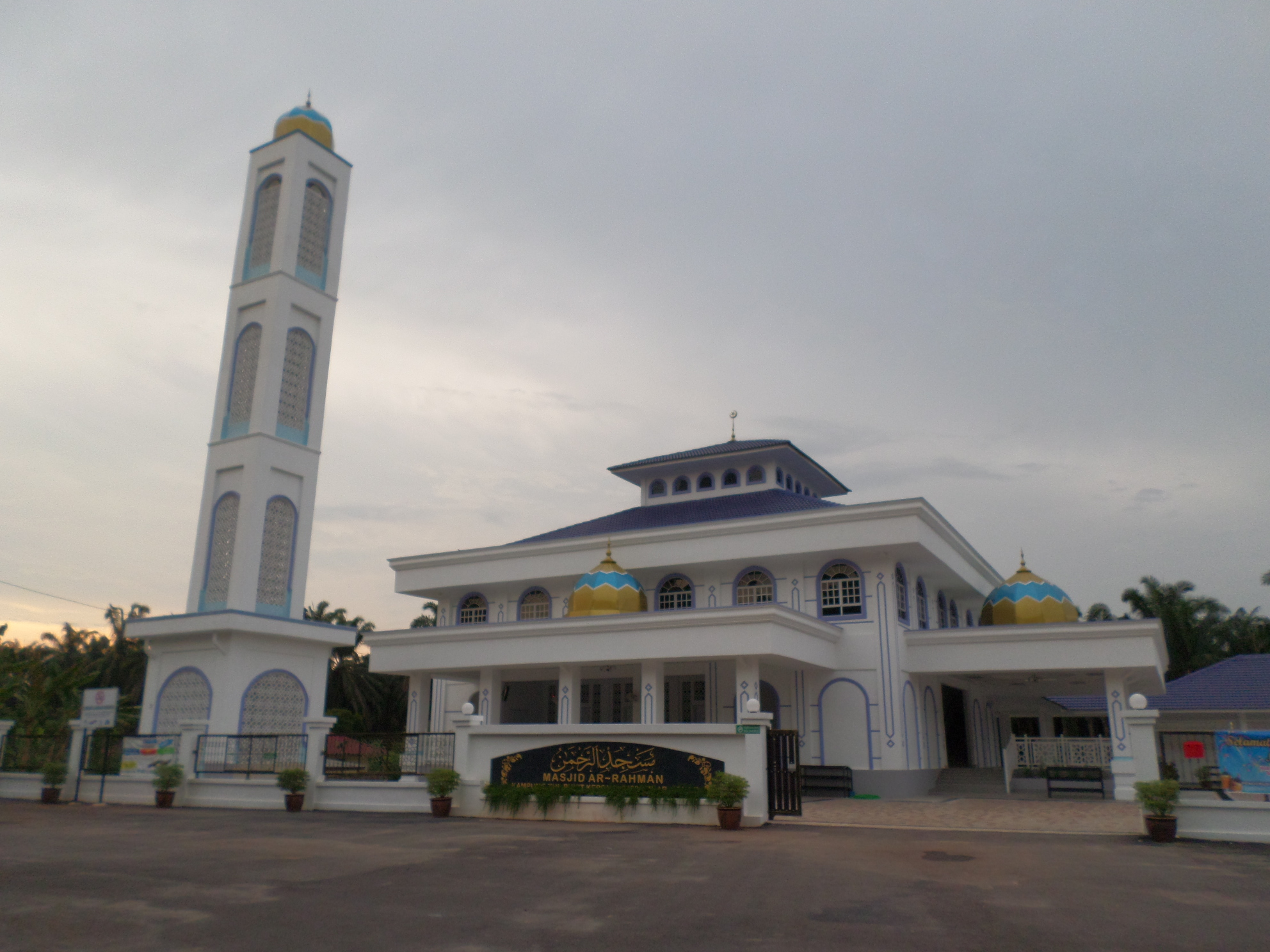
Ar-Rahman Mosque, Bukit Kepong

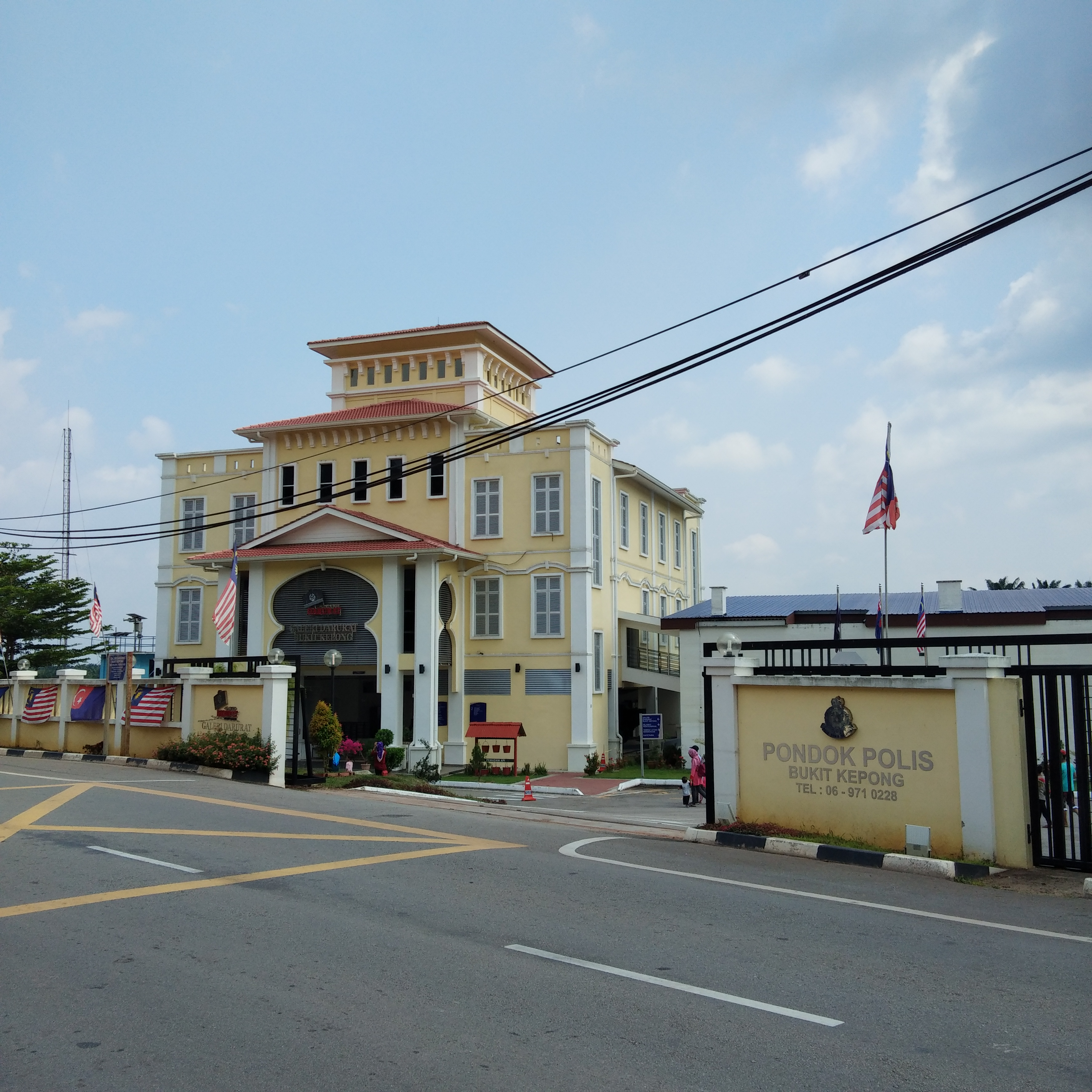
The Bukit Kepong Emergency Gallery across J32

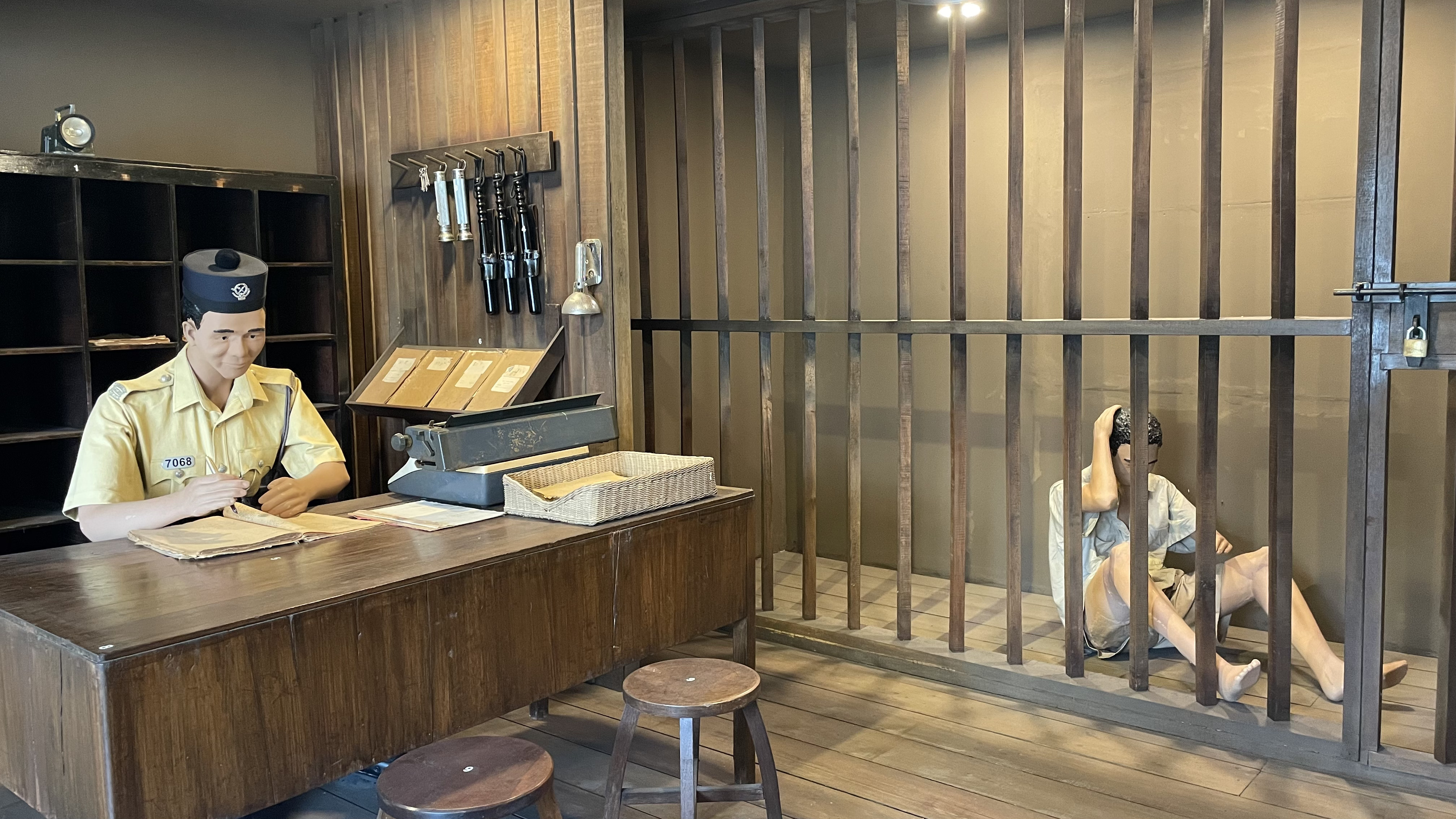
Period accurate office and jail cell diorama in the Emergency Gallery

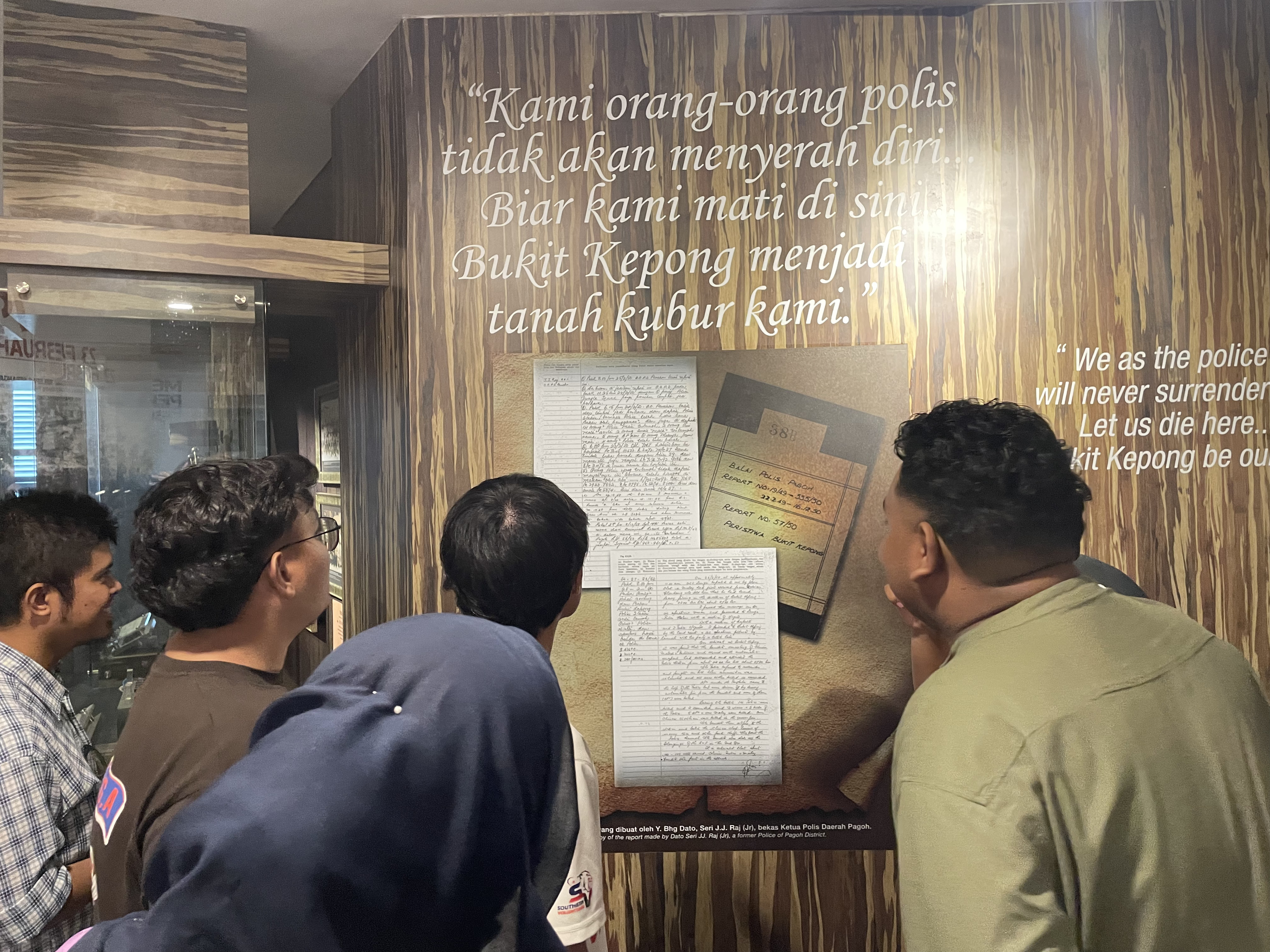
Visitors studying an exhibit in the Emergency Gallery, featuring a famous quote from the eponymous 1981 film
