= Lenga, Johor =

Administrative division in Malaysia

Coordinates: 2°17′N 102°49′E

Lenga in Muar District

Lenga (Malay for "sesame") is a mukim in Muar District, Johor, Malaysia.

== Geography ==
Lenga has 7,264 people which spreads across 292 km^{2} of land.
