= Pagoh =

Coordinates: 2°09′N 102°46′E

- Town
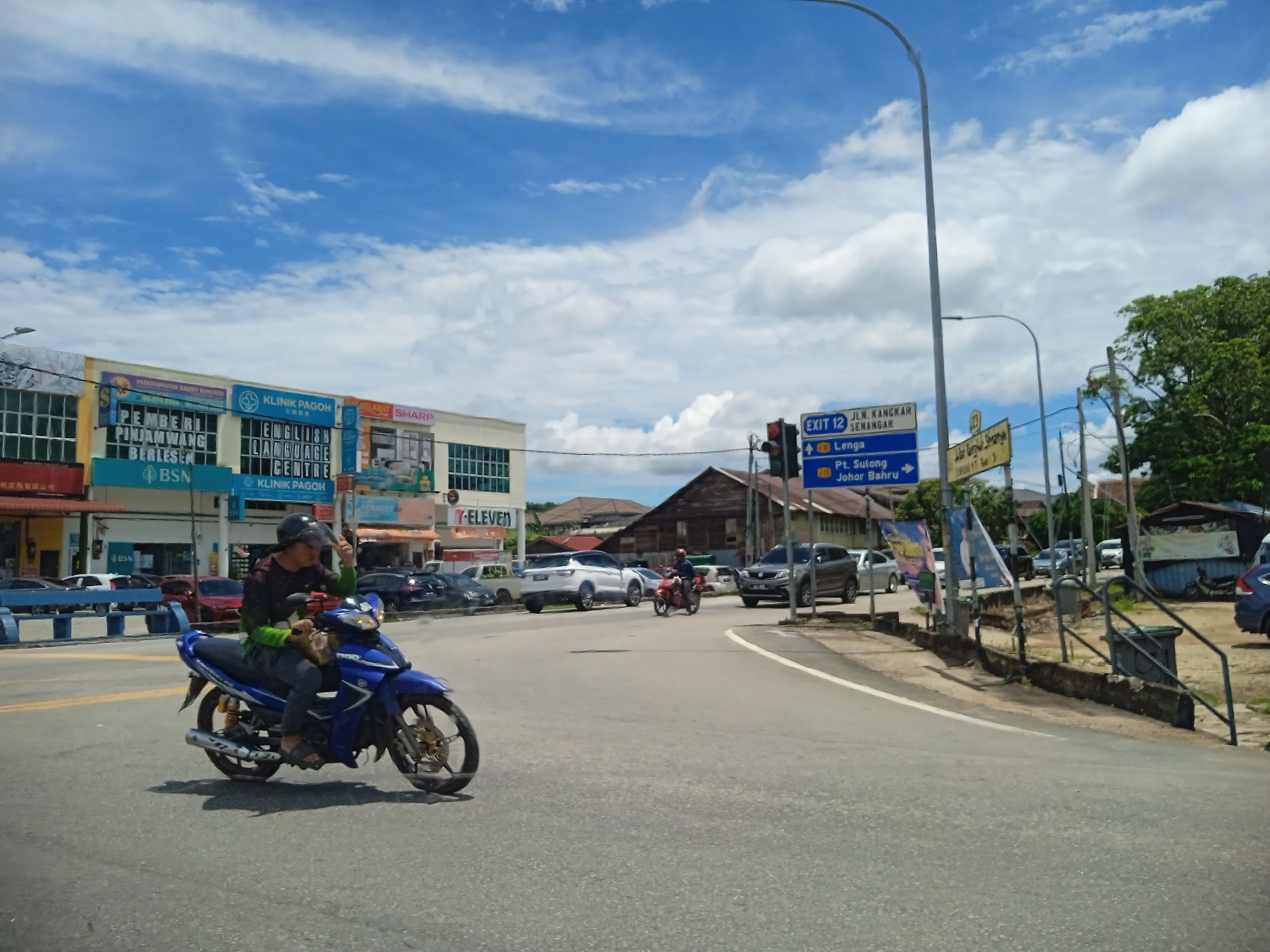
- North end of Jalan Pagoh (Johor State Highway J23) at Jalan Muar-Labis (Johor State Highway J32) in Pagoh
- Country: Malaysia
- State: Johor
- District: Muar

Pagoh is a town in Muar District, Johor, Malaysia. Pagoh is situated 25 kilometres (16 mi) from Muar via Johor State Route J32 (Muar–Labis trunk road) and is accessible via one of the main interchanges on the North–South Expressway, the major expressway on the west coast of Peninsular Malaysia. There are several federal government institutions in that town, including Institut Kemahiran Belia Negara (IKBN) and Malaysian National Service Nasuha Camp.

== History ==
During the Malayan Emergency, British and Commonwealth forces publicly displayed the corpses of communist guerrillas in Pagoh.

== Education ==
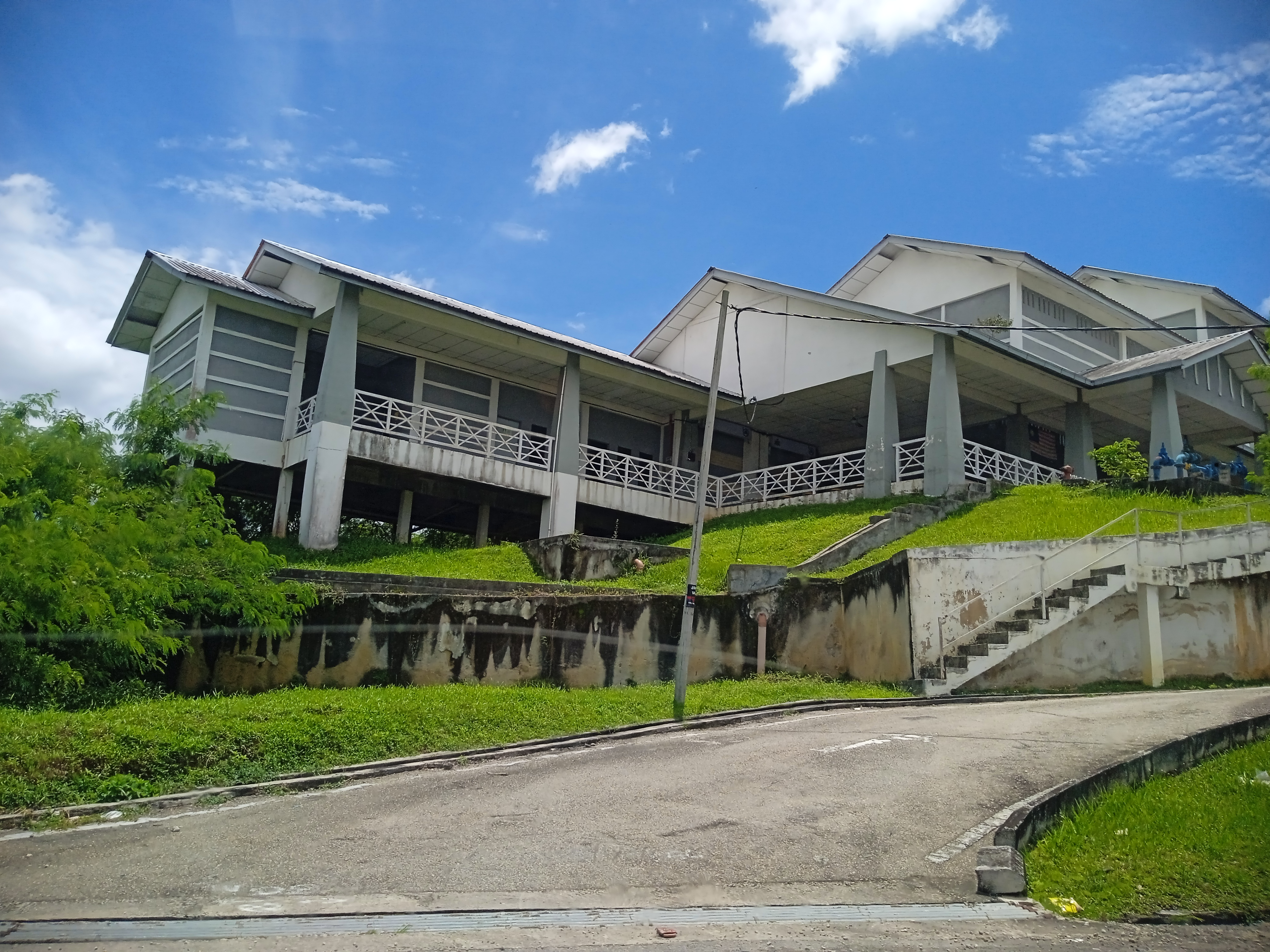
Medan Selera Pagoh

Primary education is provided by several primary schools in Pagoh. One example is SJKC (national type Chinese school) Soon Mong which is approximately 50 years old. One of the secondary schools in Pagoh is SMK Sultan Alauddin Riayat Shah I (SARS1), named after the sultan of Malacca who died in Pagoh.

Pagoh Educational Hub (EduHub Pagoh), the largest public higher education hub area in Malaysia, is being constructed at Bandar Universiti Pagoh, a new well-planned education township in Muar, has cemented Pagoh's name as a college town, housing the branch campuses of the International Islamic University of Malaysia and Tun Hussein Onn University of Malaysia and the research centre of University of Technology Malaysia. The first phase has been launched in the middle of September 2011.

== Tourist attractions ==
- Damai Orchard (Dusun Damai)
- Kampung Raja Mosque and Sultan Alauddin Riayat Shah I's tomb
- Nasuha Spice Garden (Taman Rempah Ratus Nasuha)

== Sports and recreation ==
- Pagoh National Sports Council Complex

== Health ==
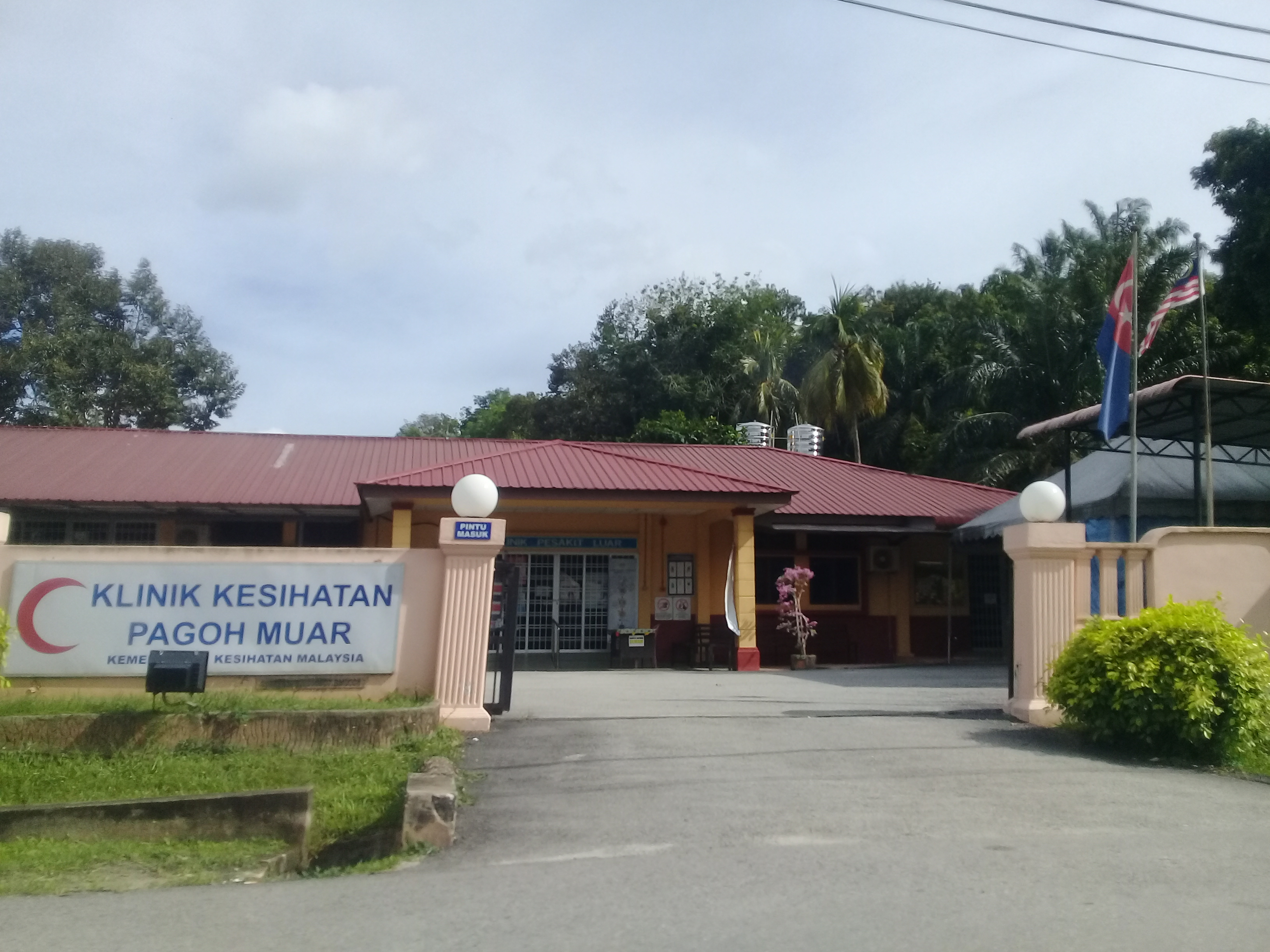
Pagoh Health Clinic

- Pagoh Health Clinic (Klinik Kesihatan Pagoh)

== Transportation ==
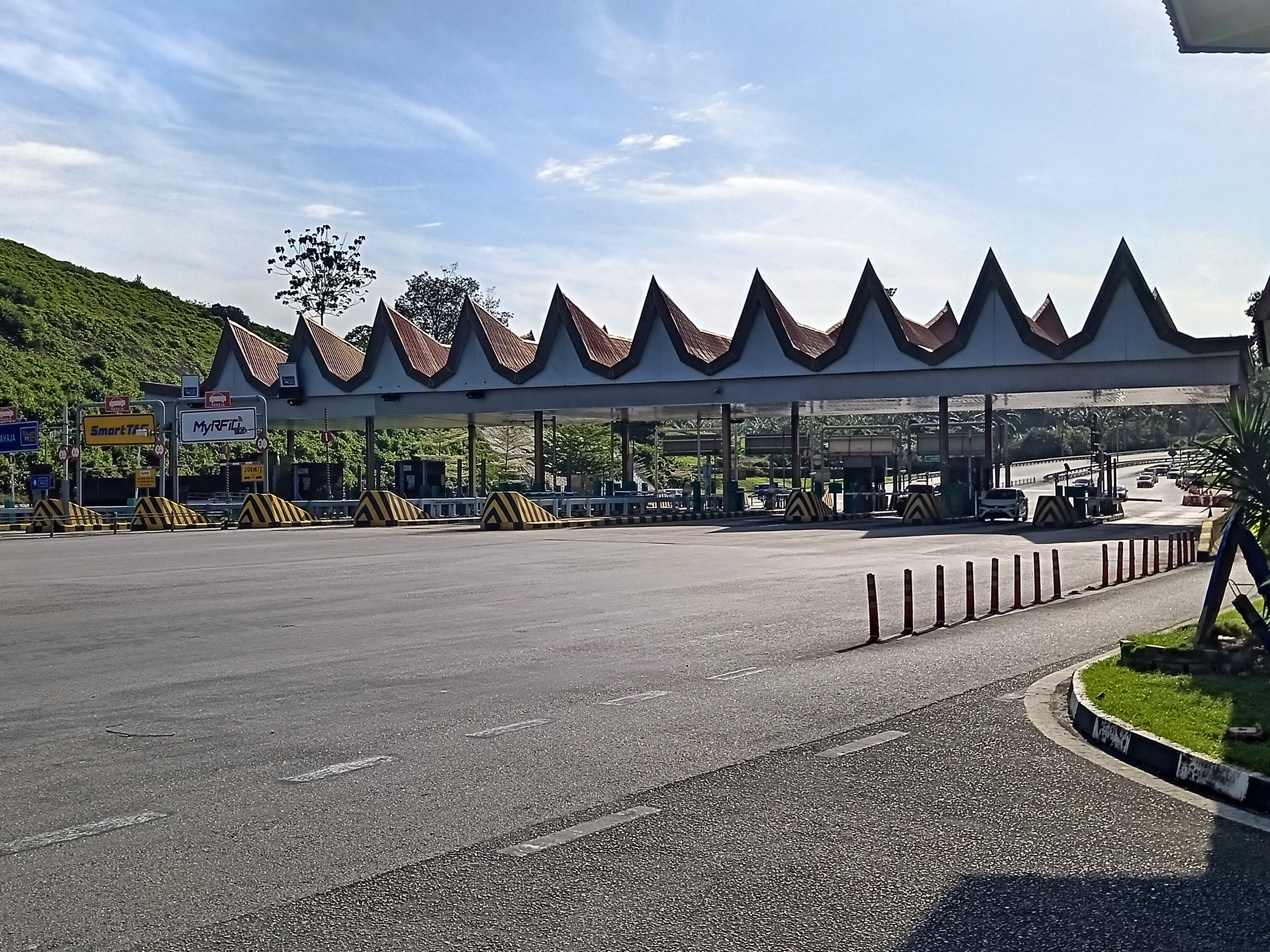
Pagoh Toll Plaza (Plaza Tol Pagoh) as main entrance to North–South Expressway via Pagoh Interchnage

Exit 238 of Pagoh Interchange (Persimpangan Pagoh) at North–South Expressway Southern Route serves Pagoh.

The area is accessible by Bas Muafakat Johor bus route MU-004 (Terminal Maharani, Muar–Pagoh).

== See also ==
- Bandar Universiti Pagoh
- Muar (town)
