= Yong Peng =

- Town
- Coat of arms

- Yong Peng shown within Batu Pahat.
- Coordinates: 2°0′00″N 103°04′0″E
- Country: Malaysia
- State: Johor
- District: Batu Pahat

Government
  - Type: Local government
  - Body: Yong Peng District Council
  - President: Mohd Norman Nor (since 16 October 2025)
- Time zone: UTC+8 (MST)
- Postcode: 83700
- Dialling code: +607
- Police: Yong Peng
- Fire: Yong Peng
- Website: www.mdyongpeng.gov.my

Yong Peng is a town in Batu Pahat District, Johor, Malaysia surrounded by Tanjung Sembrong Mukim. It has an area of 1,911.6 hectares (4,724 acres) with an estimated population of 29,046.

== History ==
Yong Peng Town (Bandar Yong Peng) near Tanjung Sembrong in Batu Pahat District

During the reign of Sultan Abu Bakar of Johor and under the influence of the British rule in the 1870s, a policy was initiated to modernise Johor and increase tax revenue by opening up more of the forest and swamp area for plantation purposes (initially for spices such as pepper and gambier; then followed by rubber). But to do so, they need massive number of workers. Coincidentally the political and social chaos in Southern China during that period (ref: History of China) made the Chinese migrants an obvious choice. Some of these early Chinese pioneers travelled from the river mouth starting from Batu Pahat and along the Bekok River (Sungai Bekok) and settled upon a fertile land not far from where Sungai Bekok and Sungai Sedi meets.

In fact, in 1800, there were only five Malay houses standing on the banks of Sungai Bekok and on Bukit Jambu (once sited the Bee Seng Sawmill and now the Yong Peng District Council). The town was known at that time as "Sri Bertam", named after a tree by the name "Bertam Tree" in Kampong Bukit Jambu. The Malays were then ruled by Arujamin Bin Runshut and most of them had just escaped from the Dutch after losing the war to the latter in Acheh.

In November 1847, four Chinese immigrants from Chaozhou led by Boo Koh Lak Loo (better known as Ah Loh) came to Sri Bertam by boat after paddling up Sungai Bekok. They then built three houses at the present Government Clinic compound. Later he and his men with the help of his Malay friends began to clear some thick forests around the river banks. When this small settlement prospered and progressed, Boo named the place Yong Peng or Everlasting Peace in Chinese.

Boo ruled Yong Peng according to the "Kangchu" or headman system where the Chinese word "Kang" means river while "Chu" means house. But essentially, "Chu" is the clan name of the first headman in charge of the plantations in the area.

When more Chinese of other dialects began moving to Yong Peng, the settlement was also expanded further up the river, opening up two more areas - one was Mah Kau Kang and the other one was Seng Kang (now Kangkar Bahru).

During this time, Sungai Bekok river was navigable by small ocean-going steamers. Local produce such as pepper and gambir were transported by boat to Batu Pahat and some to as far as Singapore; the whole journey taking about 16 days.

Kangchu Boo would also give a yearly report of Yong Peng to Sultan Abu Bakar. In order to keep law and order, one Malay by the name of Ismail was appointed the policeman of Yong Peng. Minor offences were dealt with by Kangchu Boo whilst more serious ones were sent to the magistrate's court in Batu Pahat.

Kangchu Boo died in 1907 at the age of 76. His body was buried in Tang Hak (old name for Jalan Masjid). It is around Jalan Ann Peng. After his death, his son Kangchu Boo Koh Soon Meng took over at the young age of 25. He ruled for about 35 years until his death in 1942. As he did not have a son, the Kangchu system also began to decline and it was also in the same year Yong Peng was conquered by the Japanese.

=== Emergency Period ===
After World War II, the British returned to power. However, conflict with the Communist Party of Malaya, their former ally during the Japanese occupation, emerged. In 1950, in order to contain the communist insurgency, the British instituted as part of the Briggs Plan the policy of forced relocation of large number of people and moved them into specially created settlements called "New Villages". This strategy was to prevent Communist sympathisers from supporting and supplying food to the insurgents. These camps were surrounded by barb wires and guarded day and night. Other than night curfews, residents of the camp were also strictly prohibited from carrying additional food or tools in or out of the camp. Curfews would commence at 6 o'clock in the evening and ended at 6 the next morning. In Yong Peng, a few thousand squatters who were living and cultivating along isolated jungle fringes were thus resettled in the new village.

So, Jalan Templer in Yong Peng was named after the then British High Commissioner General Gerald Templer who was known for making this famous remark, "The answer [to the uprising] lies not in pouring more troops into the jungle, but in the hearts and minds of the people." (Lapping, 224) In order to win the hearts and minds of these new villagers at this time, Malaysia's first Prime Minister, Tunku Abdul Rahman, also visited Yong Peng and opened the Yong Peng Chinese High School.

In 1952 when the local council of Yong Peng was established, Jalan Ah Loh was named in memory of Kangchu Boo Koh Ah Loh (巫许亚鲁).

=== Recent history ===
Yong Peng was also disturbed by the racial riots (mostly took place in Kuala Lumpur) during the 13 May event in 1969. Luckily, the Chinese penghulu from Yong Peng and the Malay penghulus from the surrounding Kampungs had a relatively good relationship; and working together they cobbled several arrangements that help prevent the severe bloodshed seen in other urban areas.

Then in the mid-1970s, the town was again affected by gang fights among rival gangster groups which usually took place at night outside the only cinema in Yong Peng at Jalan Templer. Peace was again restored when ASP Mokhtaruddin Yunus, dubbed by the locals as "Justice Pao" was sent to Yong Peng. Within weeks, he was able to maintain law and order and even today many locals still remember him fondly as a strict and incorruptible policeman who came to save Yong Peng.

On 27 July 2022, at 12:39 PM, a faulty appliance at the north main entry substation triggered a power failure that affected much of the northern parts of Peninsular Malaysia. The outage lasted for up to 3:02 PM as repairs gradually restored power.

== Government and politics ==
Yong Peng District Council Majlis Daerah Yong Peng
- Emblem

Type
- Type: Local authority of Yong Peng

History
- Founded: 1 September 1979
- Preceded by: Batu Pahat East District Council

Leadership
- President: Mohd Norman Nor (since 16 October 2025)
- Secretary: Muhamad Shahrul Azmi Md Kamal

Structure
- Seats: 24
- Political groups: Councillors: BN (24): UMNO (14); MCA (8); MIC (2)
- Length of term: 1 April 2024–31 December 2025

Meeting place
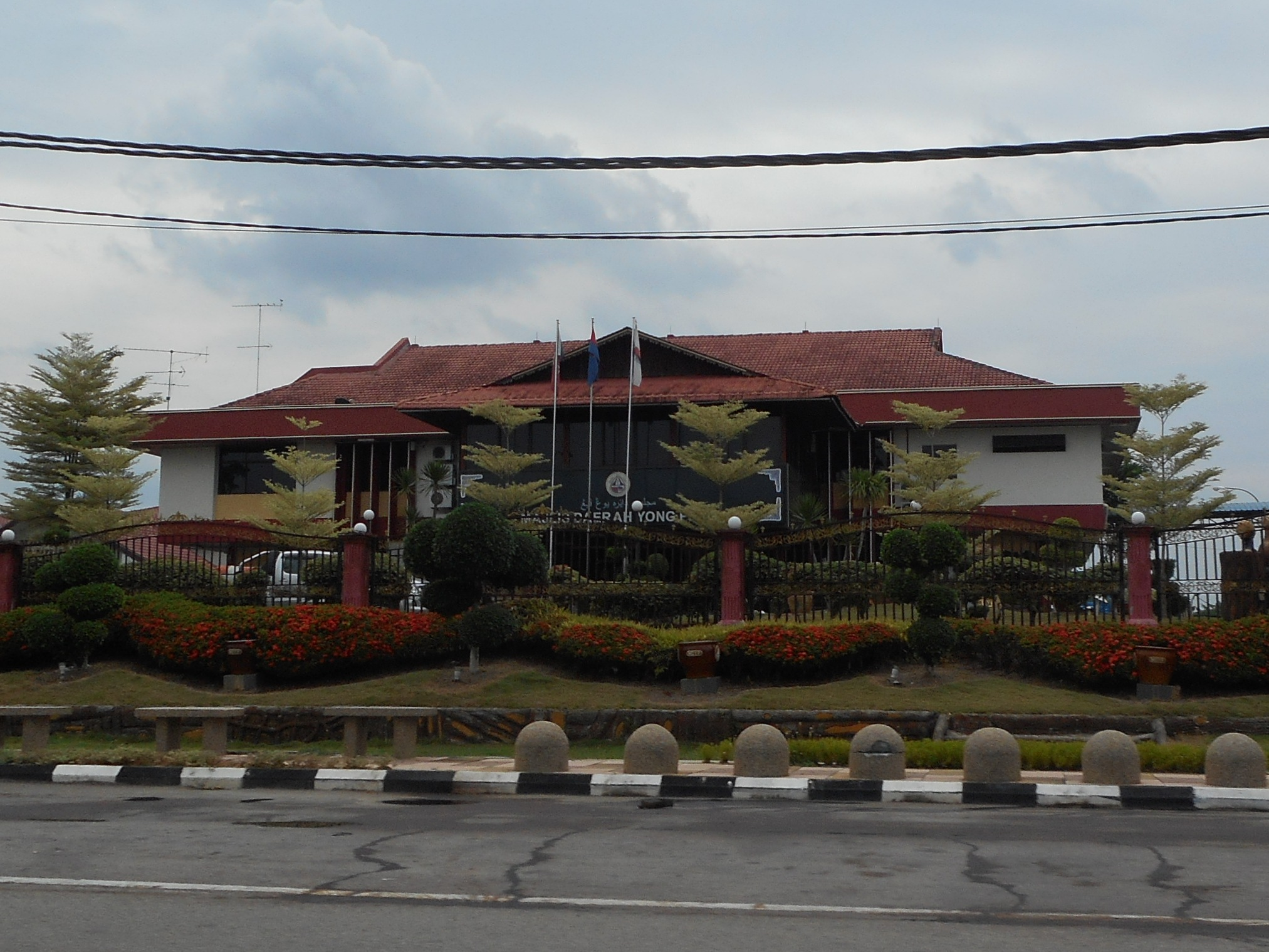
- KM 1, Jalan Labis, 83700 Yong Peng, Johor Darul Ta'zim

Website
- www.mdyongpeng.gov.my

Administrative map of Yong Peng District Council in Johor

Yong Peng has its own constituency in the Johor State Legislative Assembly, currently held by Ling Tian Soon from the Malaysian Chinese Association.

On the federal level Yong Peng is part of the Ayer Hitam parliamentary constituency. It is currently represented by Wee Ka Siong. President of the Malaysian Chinese Association which is part of the Barisan Nasional coalition.

Yong Peng is administered by the Yong Peng District Council (Majlis Daerah Yong Peng (MDYP)), previously known as Batu Pahat East District Council (Malay: Majlis Daerah Batu Pahat Timur). The district council is autonomous from Batu Pahat Town and it administers Yong Peng town and the adjacent neighbourhoods of Ayer Hitam and Tanjung Sembrong. It was established on 1 September 1979 through the merger of seven local councils (Malay: Majlis Tempatan) of Yong Peng, Ayer Hitam, Parit Sulong, Sri Medan, Kangkar Bahru, Parit Yaani and Lam Lee.

=== Departments ===
- Management Services (Khidmat Pengurusan)
- Finance (Perbendaharaan)
- Valuation & Property Management (Penilaian Dan Pengurusan Harta)
- Engineering and Building (Kejuruteraan dan Bangunan)
- Public Health (Kesihatan Awam)
- Developmental Planning & Landscape (Perancangan Pembangunan Dan Landskap)
- Licensing & Enforcement (Pelesenan Dan Penguatkuasaan)

=== Units ===
- Internal Audit (Audit Dalam)
- Law (Undang-undang)
- One Stop Centre (Pusat Sehenti)
- Public Relations and Corporate (Perhubungan Awam dan Korporat)

=== Administration areas (zones) ===
As of 2025, Yong Peng is divided into 24 zones represented by 24 councillors to act as mediators between residents and the district council. The councillors for the 1 April 2024 to 31 December 2025 session are as below:

Zone	Councillor	Political affiliation
Yong Peng 1	Samsol Mohamed Seth	UMNO
Yong Peng 2	Abdul Rashid Abdul Hamid	UMNO
Yong Peng 3	Lim Tee Siong	MCA
Yong Peng 4	Kumaran Ramakrishnan	MIC
Yong Peng 5	Tan Poh Chin	MCA
Yong Peng 6	Abdullah Shariff	UMNO
Yong Peng 7	Muhammad Khairulannuar Nordin	UMNO
Yong Peng 8	Ngaw Kai Xuan	MCA
Yong Peng 9	Muhammad Shahrezan Abdullah	UMNO
Yong Peng 10	Gan Han Wei	MCA
Yong Peng 11	Gunalan Manickam	MIC
Ayer Hitam 1	Muhammad Luqman Sufyan Mohd Junaidi	UMNO
Ayer Hitam 2	Mohd Kamal Harun	UMNO
Ayer Hitam 3	Lau Seu Kuan	MCA
Ayer Hitam 4	Sarimah Rafie	UMNO
Ayer Hitam 5	Wan Abd Aziz Wan Abdullah	UMNO
Parit Sulong 1	Mohd Alias Suleiman	UMNO
Parit Sulong 2	Mohd Nizam Misnan	UMNO
Parit Sulong 3	Tan Hwee Kok	MCA
Parit Sulong 4	Kek Beng Hui	MCA
Sri Medan 1	Rahman Mohamed	UMNO
Sri Medan 2	Siti Aileen Ahmad@Ismail	UMNO
Parit Yaani	Mohd Nizam Ridzuan	UMNO
Lam Lee-Kangkar Bahru	Ong Gin Hong	MCA

== Demographics ==
More than half of the local residents are of Chinese origin, whose forefathers migrated from southern China in the 1880s. The rest are Malays and Indians who mainly reside in the surrounding Yong Peng areas. Other than Malay, the other main language used is Mandarin with an accent strongly influenced by the Fuzhou and Hokkien Dialects. Chinese make up the majority of the population at 60%, followed by the Malays at 32%, Indians at 7%.

== Economy ==
Industrial areas in Yong Peng are Ayer Hitam, Ayer Hitam-Yong Peng Street, Yong Peng Town and Seri Wangi Industrial Areas.

== Education ==
Primary School - Yong Peng has One Chinese and two Government run National School (schools where Malay is the primary medium) - Sekolah Kebangsaan Seri Bertam and Sekolah Rendah Kebangsaan Yong Peng (SRKYP). SRKYP was the smallest of the three primary school. It was originally part of a missionary school (Anglican Church) with an emphasis on the use of English as a teaching medium. As a result, the students and teachers there have been known to be relatively more well verse in the use of English. Not long after independence, it was converted to a National School where the Malay language is used as the primary medium instead.

Secondary School - Yong Peng has one Chinese Independent school (Yong Peng High School); and two government run National schools - Sekolah Menengah Kebangsaan Yong Peng (SMYP) & SMK Dato' Seth. SMYP was the biggest of the three. It has students from all the three primary schools in Yong Peng and also from the surrounding areas such as Lam Lee, Kangkar Baru, Parit Yanni and even as far as Sri Medan.

== Food ==
Fuzhou-style bread

Yong Peng is known for its Fuzhou (福州) style cuisine. This would include Hockchew Chow Mien (handmade noodles that are first boiled, then stir fried); Hockchew Egg Soup; Hockchew Fishball (one of the bounciest fishballs; with fish on the outside and pork on the inside); Fermented Red Rice Wine Chicken; Fermented Red Rice Wine Noodles; Hockchew Square Bread (typically pork fat or meat is added as filling); and Hockchew plain bread (also known as Yong Peng bread - round shaped yeast bread that is available as plain with sesame seed, sweet or salted; no fillings within).

There are many local Malay and Indian food stalls (warung). One famous place is near the wet market, where people usually go for breakfast. It is famous for its nasi lemak, lontong and mee goreng (fried noodle, Malay style). The Rendang, Kari Ekor (Ox Tail Soup) and Roti Canai are all additions to the local cuisine.

== Tourist attractions ==
- Fortune Dragon (转运祥龙) - built by Che Ann Khor Yong Peng Association (德教会紫安阁)
- Tian Pao Kong Temple (永平天保宫) - famous for the 68 feet tall Ji Gong bronze statue
- Rumah Berhala Gua Naga Hitam Temple (柔佛州永平黒龍洞三聖公神廟)

== Transportation ==
Yong Peng has two main interchanges on North–South Expressway including north to Kuala Lumpur and south to Johor Bahru. The old north–south trunk road, the Federal Route 1 runs through downtown Yong Peng. PLUS Expressway has an exit serving Yong Peng town. Connection to Muar, Parit Sulong and Batu Pahat is possible via Federal Route 24 while access to Kluang and Mersing is through the interchange with the Batu Pahat–Kluang–Jemaluang highway (Federal Route 50) near Ayer Hitam.
