= Johor State Route J125 =

Road in Malaysia

Johor Route 125
- Jalan Sengkuang
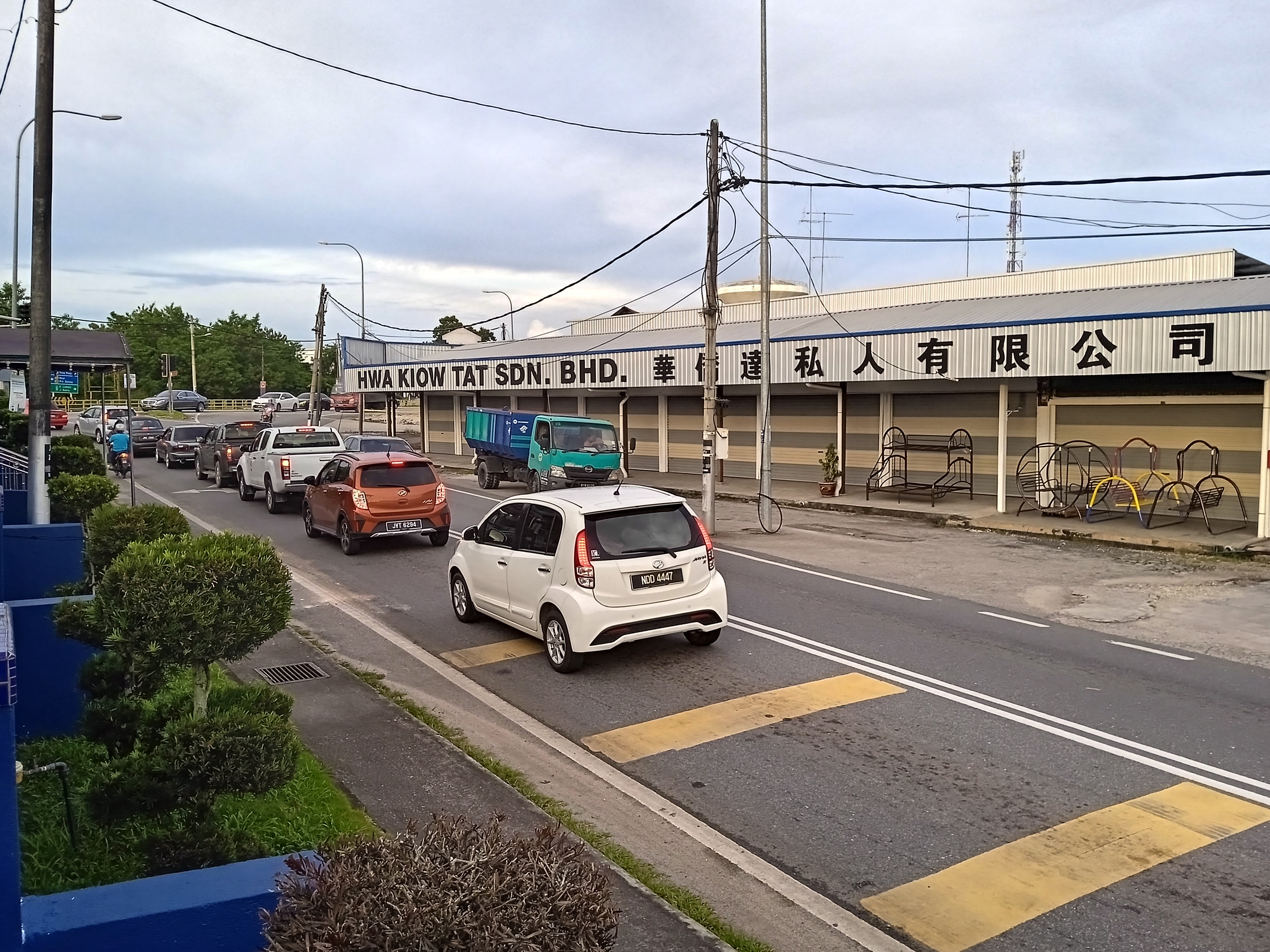
- Northern terminus of Johor State Route J125 at Parit Yaani

Route information
- Length: 14.3 km (8.9 mi)

Major junctions
- North end: Parit Yaani
- FT 24 Federal Route 24; FT 50 Federal Route 50
- South end: Sri Gading

Location
- Country: Malaysia
- Primary destinations: Sri Bengkal

Highway system
- Highways in Malaysia; Expressways; Federal; State

Jalan Sengkuang (Johor State Route J125) is a major road in Johor, Malaysia.

== Junction lists ==
The entire route is located in Batu Pahat District, Johor.

Legend:

- I/C - Interchange, I/S - Intersection, RSA - Rest and service area, OBR - Overhead bridge restaurant, R/R - Restaurant and rest plaza, L/B - Layby, V/P - Vista point, TN - tunnel, T/P - Toll plaza, BR - Bridge
- C - Cloverleaf, S - Stack, T-A - Trumpet-A, T-B - Trumpet-B, DT - Directional-T/Y, SDT - Semi-Directional-T/Y, P-Y - Partial-Y, D - Diamond, P-C - Partial cloverleaf, D-D - Diverging diamond, D-R - Direct ramp

Km	Exit	Name	Destinations	Notes
		Parit Yaani	FT 24 Malaysia Federal Route 24 – Muar, Bakri, Parit Sulong, Batu Pahat, Yong Peng, Segamat; North–South Expressway Southern Route / AH2 – Kuala Lumpur, Johor Bahru	T-junctions
		Kampung Parit Suratman		
		Kampung Parit Paimin		
		Sri Bengkal		
	BR	Sungai Simpang Kanan bridge		
		Kampung Seri Gading		
		Sri Gading	FT 50 Malaysia Federal Route 50 – Batu Pahat, Parit Raja, Ayer Hitam, Kluang, Mersing; North–South Expressway Southern Route / AH2 – Kuala Lumpur, Johor Bahru	T-junctions
