= Johor State Route J128 =

Road in Malaysia

Johor Route 128
- Jalan Kangkar Senangar
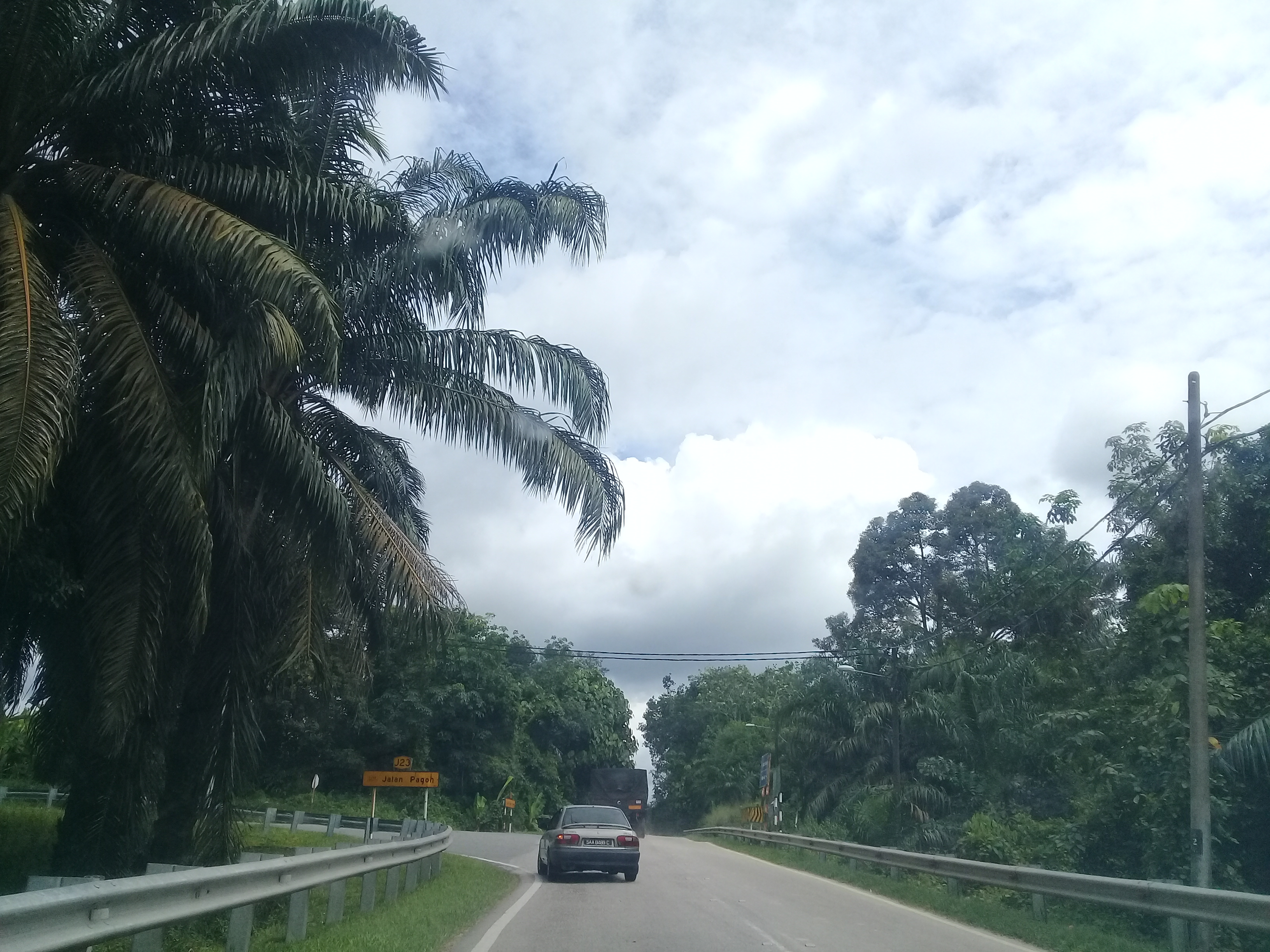

Major junctions
- North end: Sri Medan Interchange (planned)
- North–South Expressway Southern Route / AH2; Jalan Kampung Air Puteh; J23 State Route J23; FT 24 Federal Route 24
- Southeast end: Parit Sulong

Location
- Country: Malaysia
- Primary destinations: Kangkar Senangar

Highway system
- Highways in Malaysia; Expressways; Federal; State

Johor State Route J128, Jalan Kangkar Senangar is a major road in Johor, Malaysia. It is also the main route to Kangkar Senangar. It will become a main route to North–South Expressway Southern Route via proposed Sri Medan Interchange.

== History ==
In March 2025, the PLUS Expressways agree to build the new Sri Medan Interchange at North–South Expressway Southern Route KM122.

== Features ==
- Some road sections only allow one direction at the same time

== Junction lists ==
The entire route is located in Batu Pahat District, Johor.

Legend:

- I/C - Interchange, I/S - Intersection, RSA - Rest and service area, OBR - Overhead bridge restaurant, R/R - Restaurant and rest plaza, L/B - Layby, V/P - Vista point, TN - tunnel, T/P - Toll plaza, BR - Bridge
- C - Cloverleaf, S - Stack, T-A - Trumpet-A, T-B - Trumpet-B, DT - Directional-T/Y, SDT - Semi-Directional-T/Y, P-Y - Partial-Y, D - Diamond, P-C - Partial cloverleaf, D-D - Diverging diamond, D-R - Direct ramp

Km	Exit	Name	Destinations	Notes
	I/C	Sri Medan–NSE I/C	North–South Expressway Southern Route / AH2 – Kuala Lumpur, Malacca, Pagoh, Yong Peng, Johor Bahru, Singapore	Under planning
		Kangkar Senangar	Jalan Kampung Air Puteh – Kampung Air Puteh	T-junctions
		Kangkar Senangar	J23 Johor State Route J23 – Pagoh, Muar, Lenga, Bukit Kepong, Labis	T-junctions
	BR	Sungai Ayer Hitam bridge		
		Kampung Parit Gantung		
	I/S	Parit Sulong	FT 24 Malaysia Federal Route 24 – Muar, Bakri, Parit Sulong, Batu Pahat, Yong Peng; North–South Expressway Southern Route / AH2 – Kuala Lumpur, Malacca, Johor Bahru, Singapore	T-junctions
