= Malaysia Federal Route 24 =

Road in Malaysia

Federal Route 24
- Jalan Muar–Yong Peng
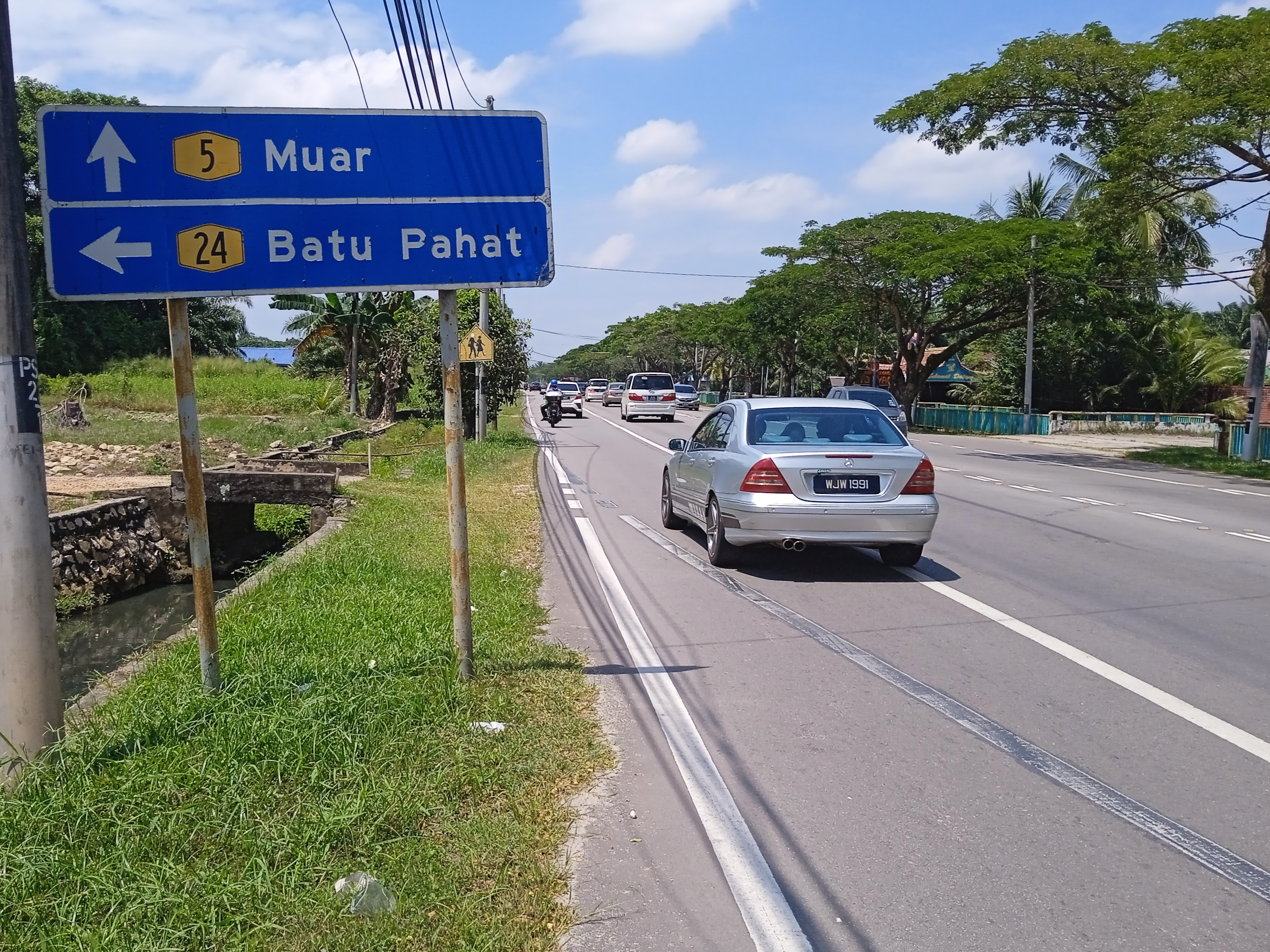

Route information
- Maintained by Malaysian Public Works Department
- Length: 65.31 km (40.58 mi)
- Existed: 1869–present
- History: Completed in 1870 and then widened and straightened in 1890

Major junctions
- West end: Muar (Bandar Maharani); Bentayan Roundabout
- FT 5 Federal Route 5 J140 State Route J140; FT 224 Muar Bypass; J135 State Route J135; J133 State Route J133; J131 State Route J131; FT 85 Federal Route 85; J128 State Route J128; J19 State Route J19; J126 State Route J126; J13 State Route J13; J35 State Route J35; J125 State Route J125; North–South Expressway Southern Route / AH2 FT 1 / AH142 Federal Route 1
- East end: Yong Peng

Location
- Country: Malaysia
- Primary destinations: Bakri, Parit Sulong, Batu Pahat, Tongkang Pechah, Parit Yaani

Highway system
- Highways in Malaysia; Expressways; Federal; State

Federal Route 24, or Jalan Muar–Yong Peng, is a federal road in Johor, Malaysia. The roads connects Muar (Bandar Maharani) in the west to Yong Peng in the east. It is also a main route to North–South Expressway via Yong Peng Interchange.

== Route background ==
The Kilometre Zero of the Federal Route 24 is located at Bulatan Bentayan roundabout in Muar (Bandar Maharani), at its interchange with the Federal Route 5, the main trunk road of the west coast of Peninsular Malaysia.

== History ==
The Federal Route 24 is one of the earliest roads in the state of Johor. It was built in 1869 as a village road and was completed in 1870. Then the road was widened and straightened by Dato' Mohd. Salleh bin Perang (Dato 'Bentara Luar) in 1890. At that time, the Federal Route 24 holds the record as the longest straight and flat road in Malaya.

This road has a notable history especially during World War II.

== Features ==
- Parit Sulong Historical (demolished in 1997)
- Parit Sulong War Memorial in Parit Sulong
- Siege of Bakri historical site
- Bakri Japanese war cemetery during Battle of Muar in World War II

At most sections, the Federal Route 24 was built under the JKR R5 road standard, with a speed limit of 90 km/h.

== Junction and town lists ==
The entire route is located in Johor.

Legend:

- I/C - Interchange, I/S - Intersection, RSA - Rest and service area, OBR - Overhead bridge restaurant, R/R - Restaurant and rest plaza, L/B - Layby, V/P - Vista point, TN - tunnel, T/P - Toll plaza, BR - Bridge
- C - Cloverleaf, S - Stack, T-A - Trumpet-A, T-B - Trumpet-B, DT - Directional-T/Y, SDT - Semi-Directional-T/Y, P-Y - Partial-Y, D - Diamond, P-C - Partial cloverleaf, D-D - Diverging diamond, D-R - Direct ramp

| District | Subdistrict | Km | Exit | Name | Destinations | Notes |
|---|---|---|---|---|---|---|
| Muar | Muar | 0.0 | I/S | Muar; Bentayan Roundabout | FT 5 Malaysia Federal Route 5 – Malacca, Tangkak, Jementah, Segamat, Pagoh, Labis, Parit Bakar, Parit Jawa, Batu Pahat, Pontian; North–South Expressway Southern Route / AH2 – Kuala Lumpur, Johor Bahru | Roundabout |
| Muar | Muar | | | Muar; Jalan Dato' Haji Hassan | Jalan Dato' Haji Hassan | Junctions |
| Muar | Muar | | | Muar; Jalan Hashim | Jalan Hashim | T-junctions |
| Muar | Muar | | | Muar; Jalan Sakeh | Jalan Sakeh | T-junctions |
| Muar | Muar | | | Muar; Jalan Haji Jaib | Jalan Haji Jaib | T-junctions |
| Muar | Muar | | L/B | McDonald's Drive Thru | McDonald's Drive Thru | |
| Muar | Muar | | | Muar; Jalan Haji Abdullah | Jalan Haji Abdullah – Sungai Abong, Road Transport Department Malaysia (JPJ) district branch office | T-junctions |
| Muar | Muar | | | Muar; Jalan Dato' Haji Kosai | J140 Jalan Dato' Haji Kosai – Parit Bakar, Parit Jawa | T-junctions |
| Muar | Muar | | | Bandar Maharani Gateway Arch | | |
| Muar | Muar | | | Muar Bypass | FT 224 Muar Bypass – Malacca, Tangkak, Jementah, Segamat, Pagoh, Parit Bakar, Parit Jawa, Batu Pahat, Pontian; North–South Expressway Southern Route / AH2 – Kuala Lumpur, Johor Bahru | Interchange |
| Muar | Muar | | | Simpang Jeram | J135 Johor State Route J135 – Jorak, Sungai Terap, Bukit Pasir, Pagoh, Bandar Universiti Pagoh; North–South Expressway Southern Route / AH2 – Kuala Lumpur, Johor Bahru | T-junctions |
| Muar | Muar | | | Jalan Sri Tanjung | J133 Johor State Route J133 – Bukit Mor, Parit Jawa | T-junctions |
| Muar | Muar | | | Kampung Batu Lima | | |
| Muar | Muar | | | Bakri Muslim Cemetery | | |
| Muar | Muar | | | Bakri | Sekolah Menengah Sains PDRM Bakri | T-junctions |
| Muar | Muar | | | Bakri | Jalan Ujong | Corner T-junctions |
| Muar | Muar | | | Japanese War Cemetery | | Historical site |
| Muar | Muar | | | Bakri Cemetery | Chinese cemetery, Christian Cemetery, Hindu cemetery | T-junctions |
| Muar | Muar | | | Bakri Industrial Area | | T-junctions |
| Muar | Muar | | | Siege of Bakri Historical Site | Siege of Bakri Historical Site | Historical site during World War II; Historical site |
| Muar | Muar | | | Paya Bakri | J131 Jalan Bukit Mor – Bukit Mor, Parit Jawa, Batu Pahat | T-junctions |
| Muar | Muar | | BR | Sungai Sarang Buaya bridge | | |
| Muar | Muar | | | Kampung Kenangan | | |
| Muar | Muar | | | Bukit Bakri-WCE | West Coast Expressway | Under planning |
| Muar | Muar | | | Bukit Naning | | |
| Muar | Muar | | | Parit Jepun | | |
| Muar | Muar | | | Parit Tengah | FT 85 Malaysia Federal Route 85 – Pekan Baru Parit Yusuf, Sungai Balang, Batu Pahat | T-junctions |
| Muar | Muar | | | Parit Hassan Ahmad Satu | | |
| Batu Pahat | Yong Peng | | | Kampung Parit Gantong | | |
| Batu Pahat | Yong Peng | | | Jalan Pagoh–Parit Sulong | J128 Johor State Route J128 – Kangkar Senangar, Pagoh; North–South Expressway Southern Route / AH2 – Kuala Lumpur, Johor Bahru | T-junctions |
| Batu Pahat | Yong Peng | | | Parit Sulong; Jalan Simpang Lima–Parit Sulong | J19 Johor State Route J19 – Simpang Lima, Peserai, Batu Pahat | T-junctions |
| Batu Pahat | Yong Peng | | | Parit Sulong | | |
| Batu Pahat | Yong Peng | | | Parit Sulong; Parit Sulong War Memorial | Parit Sulong War Memorial; V | Historical site during World War II; Historical site |
| Batu Pahat | Yong Peng | | BR | Sungai Simpang Kiri bridge Parit Sulong Bridge | | Historical site during World War II; Historical site |
| Batu Pahat | Yong Peng | | | Jalan Parit Sulong–Tongkang Pechah | J126 Johor State Route J126 – Tongkang Pechah, Batu Pahat | T-junctions |
| Batu Pahat | Yong Peng | | | Kampung Baharu | | |
| Batu Pahat | Yong Peng | | | Kampung Kangkar Merlimau | | |
| Batu Pahat | Yong Peng | | | Kampung Mohd Noor | | |
| Batu Pahat | Yong Peng | | | Tongkang Pechah-WCE | West Coast Expressway | Under planning |
| Batu Pahat | Yong Peng | | | Jalan Tongkang Pechah | J13 Johor State Route J13 – Tongkang Pechah, Batu Pahat | T-junctions |
| Batu Pahat | Yong Peng | | | Jalan Seri Medan | J35 Johor State Route J35 – Seri Medan | T-junctions |
| Batu Pahat | Yong Peng | | | Kampung Seri Wangi | | |
| Batu Pahat | Yong Peng | | | Parit Yaani | J125 Johor State Route J125 – Sri Bengkal, Sri Gading, Parit Raja | T-junctions |
| Batu Pahat | Yong Peng | | | Kampung Parit Tengah | | |
| Batu Pahat | Yong Peng | | | Kampung Parit Serani | | |
| Batu Pahat | Yong Peng | | | PLUS PLUS Expressways section maintenances office PROPEL PROPEL section maintenances office | | |
| Batu Pahat | Yong Peng | | | Yong Peng North-NSE | North–South Expressway Southern Route / AH2 – Kuala Lumpur, Malacca, Pagoh, Ayer Hitam, Simpang Renggam, Johor Bahru | T-junctions |
| Batu Pahat | Yong Peng | | | Yong Peng Muslim Cemetery | | |
| Batu Pahat | Yong Peng | | R/R | Yong Peng R/R | Yong Peng R/R – Petron; Restoran Lucky Garden | |
| Batu Pahat | Yong Peng | | | Kampung Parit Awang | | |
| Batu Pahat | Yong Peng | | BR | Sungai Bekok bridge | | |
| Batu Pahat | Yong Peng | | | Yong Peng | FT 1 / AH142 Malaysia Federal Route 1 – Gemas, Kuantan, Segamat, Labis, Ayer Hitam, Kluang, Mersing, Simpang Renggam; North–South Expressway Southern Route / AH2 – Ayer Hitam, Simpang Renggam, Johor Bahru | T-junctions |

== Gallery ==
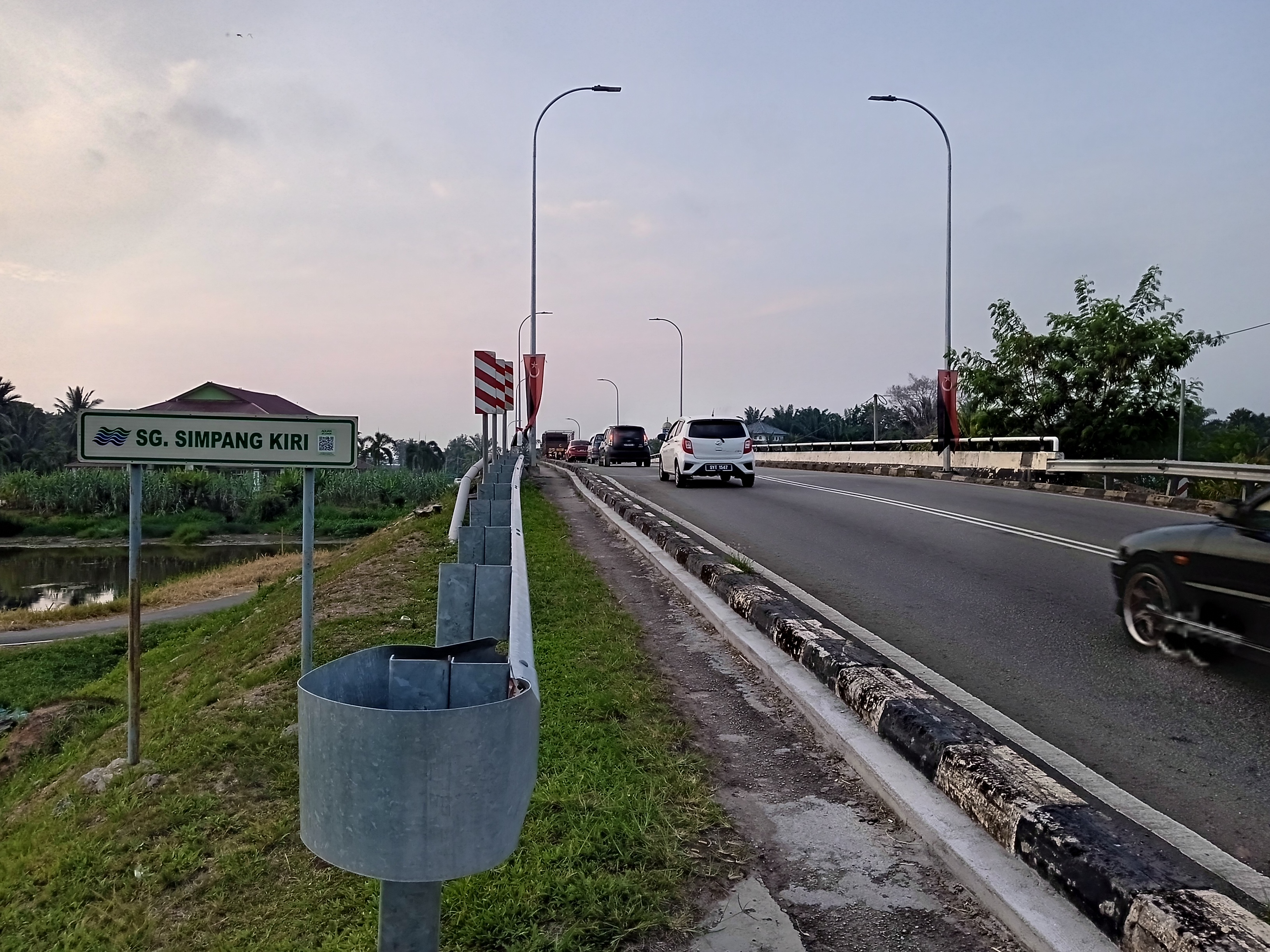
Parit Sulong Bridge (Sungai Simpang Kiri Bridge) at Parit Sulong
