= Malaysia Federal Route 85 =

Road in Malaysia

Federal Route 85
- Jalan Parit Yusuf

Route information
- Maintained by Malaysian Public Works Department
- Length: 15.14 km (9.41 mi)

Major junctions
- North end: Parit Tengah
- FT 5 Federal Route 5 FT 24 Federal Route 24
- South end: Pekan Baru Parit Yusuf

Location
- Country: Malaysia
- Primary destinations: Bakri, Parit Sulong, Sungai Balang, Batu Pahat

Highway system
- Highways in Malaysia; Expressways; Federal; State

Jalan Parit Yusuf, Federal Route 85, is a federal road in Johor, Malaysia. The 15.1 km (9.4 mi) road connects Parit Tengah in the north to Pekan Baru Parit Yusuf in the south.

== Route background ==
The Kilometre Zero of the Federal Route 85 is located at Pekan Baru Parit Yusuf, at its interchange with the Federal Route 5, the main trunk road of the west coast of Peninsular Malaysia.

== Features ==
At most sections, the Federal Route 85 was built under the JKR R5 road standard, allowing maximum speed limit of up to 90 km/h.

== Junction lists ==
The entire route is located in Muar District, Johor.

Legend:

- I/C - Interchange, I/S - Intersection, RSA - Rest and service area, OBR - Overhead bridge restaurant, R/R - Restaurant and rest plaza, L/B - Layby, V/P - Vista point, TN - tunnel, T/P - Toll plaza, BR - Bridge
- C - Cloverleaf, S - Stack, T-A - Trumpet-A, T-B - Trumpet-B, DT - Directional-T/Y, SDT - Semi-Directional-T/Y, P-Y - Partial-Y, D - Diamond, P-C - Partial cloverleaf, D-D - Diverging diamond, D-R - Direct ramp

Km	Exit	Name	Destinations	Note
0.0	I/S	Pekan Baru Parit Yusuf	FT 5 Malaysia Federal Route 5 – Malacca, Segamat, Jementah, Tangkak, Muar, Parit Jawa, Batu Pahat, Pontian, Johor Bahru	T-junctions
	BR	Parit Keliling Parit Yusuf bridge		
		Kampung Parit Bali		
		Kampung Sungai Tengah	Kampung Sungai Tengah	T-junctions
		Kampung Parit Ibrahim		
		Kampung Parit Begelen		
		Kampung Buluh China		
	I/S	Jalan Parit Yusuf Darat	J130 Jalan Parit Yusuf Darat – Bukit Mor, Parit Jawa	T-junctions
		Kampung Sarang Buaya	Kampung Sarang Buaya (Homestay)	T-junctions
	BR	Sungai Sarang Buaya bridge		
		Kampung Parit Jepun	Kampung Parit Jepun	T-junctions
		Kampung Bukit Tengah		
15.0	–	–		
15.1	I/S	Parit Tengah	FT 24 Malaysia Federal Route 24 – Muar, Bakri, Parit Sulong, Yong Peng, Segamat; North–South Expressway Southern Route / AH2 – Kuala Lumpur, Johor Bahru	T-junctions
