= Parit Sulong Bridge =

Bridge in Parit Sulong, Batu Pahat, Johor, Malaysia

Sungai Simpang Kiri Bridge Jambatan Parit Sulong 巴力士隆桥
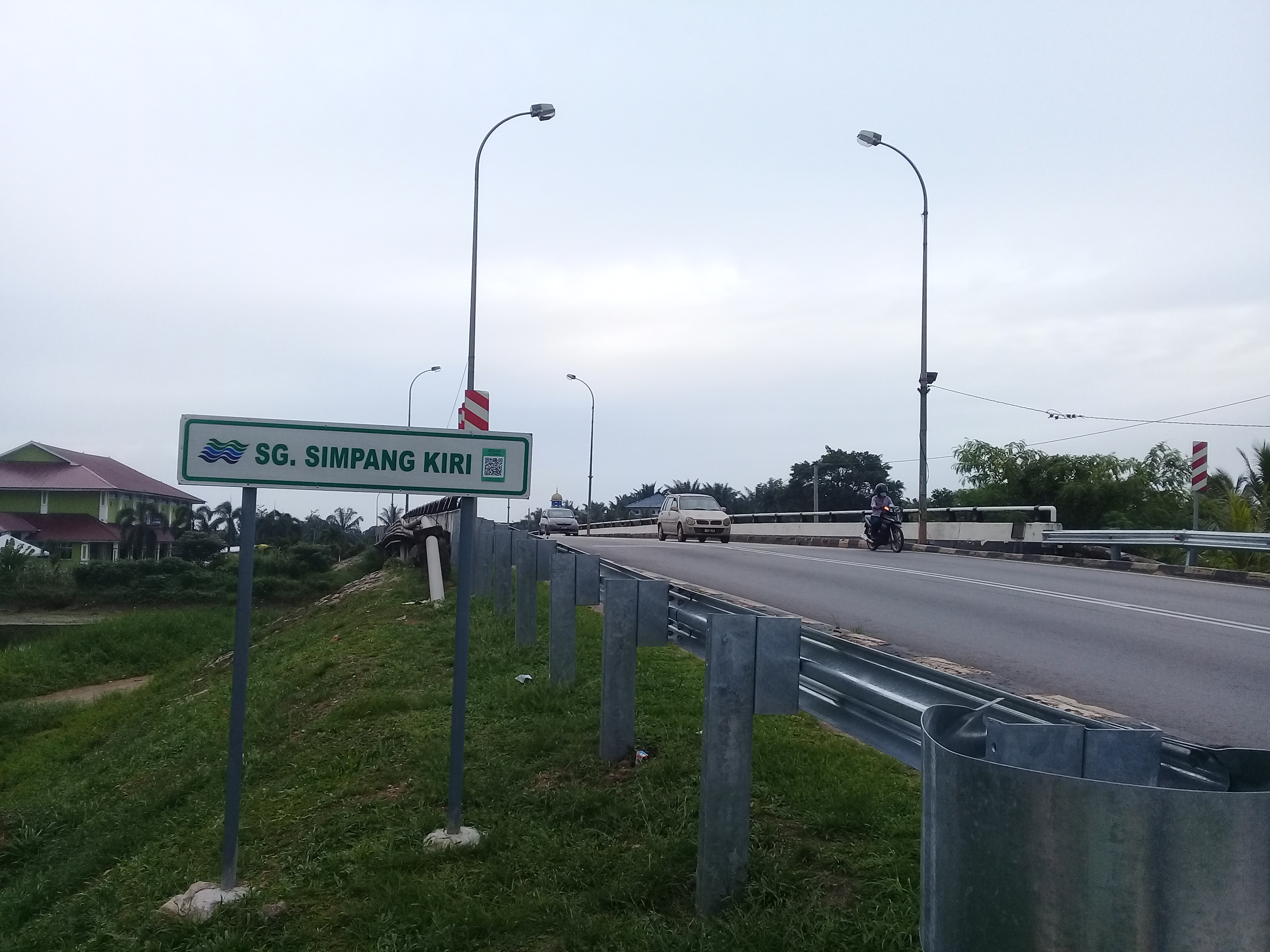
- Coordinates: 1°58′21″N 102°53′04″E
- Carries: Motor vehicles, Pedestrians
- Crosses: Simpang Kiri River
- Locale: Jalan Muar–Yong Peng
- Official name: Parit Sulong Bridge
- Maintained by: Malaysian Public Works Department (JKR) Batu Pahat

Characteristics
- Design: arch bridge
- Width: --
- Longest span: --

History
- Designer: Malaysian Public Works Department (JKR)
- Constructed by: Malaysian Public Works Department (JKR)
- Opened: 1930

Location
- Interactive map of Sungai Simpang Kiri Bridge

Parit Sulong Bridge (Malay: Jambatan Parit Sulong) is a bridge in Parit Sulong, Batu Pahat District, Johor, Malaysia. The original bridge was the site of a famous battle during World War II.

== History ==
=== Construction ===
The construction of the first bridge began in 1925 and it was completed in 1929. The late Almarhum Sultan Ibrahim of Johor later officiated the opening of the bridge in 1930. The construction of the bridge with the curve shape at the middle for the purpose of convenient passage for bauxite ore barge from Seri Medan.

Anecdotal accounts by local people also reported the late Almarhum Sultan Ibrahim of Johor has shaking one of the bridge structure with intention for examination of bridge firm.

=== The Battle of Parit Sulong Bridge ===
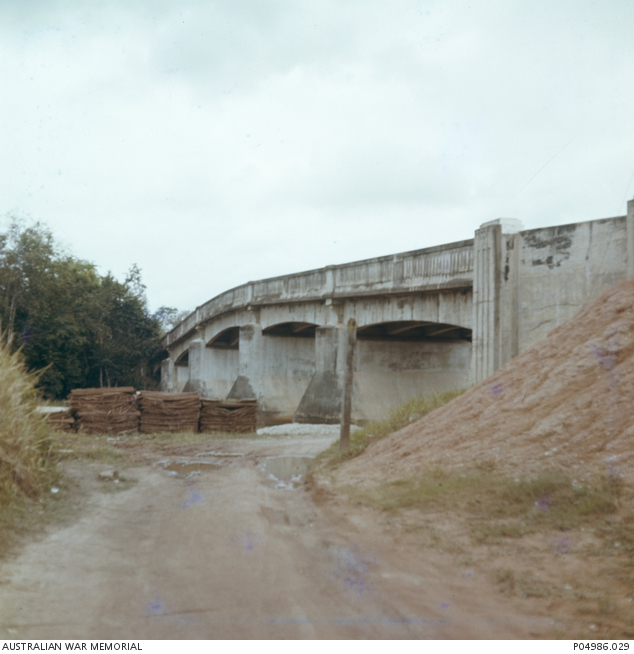
The bridge in 1963, where Australian soldiers fought in the final stage of the battle of Muar against overwhelming Japanese forces. A memorial plaque commemorating fallen Allies was erected there on that same year.

During World War II, the battle of Parit Sulong Bridge between the British and Imperial Japanese Army took place on January 21, 1942.

=== End of the old bridge ===
In 1993, the Johor state government decided to demolish the old bridge and replace it. The old bridge was finally torn down in 1994. The new bridge was constructed on 1995 and completed in 1997.
