= Johor State Route J23 =

Johor Route 23
- Jalan Kangkar Senanga; Jalan Pagoh–Parit Sulong
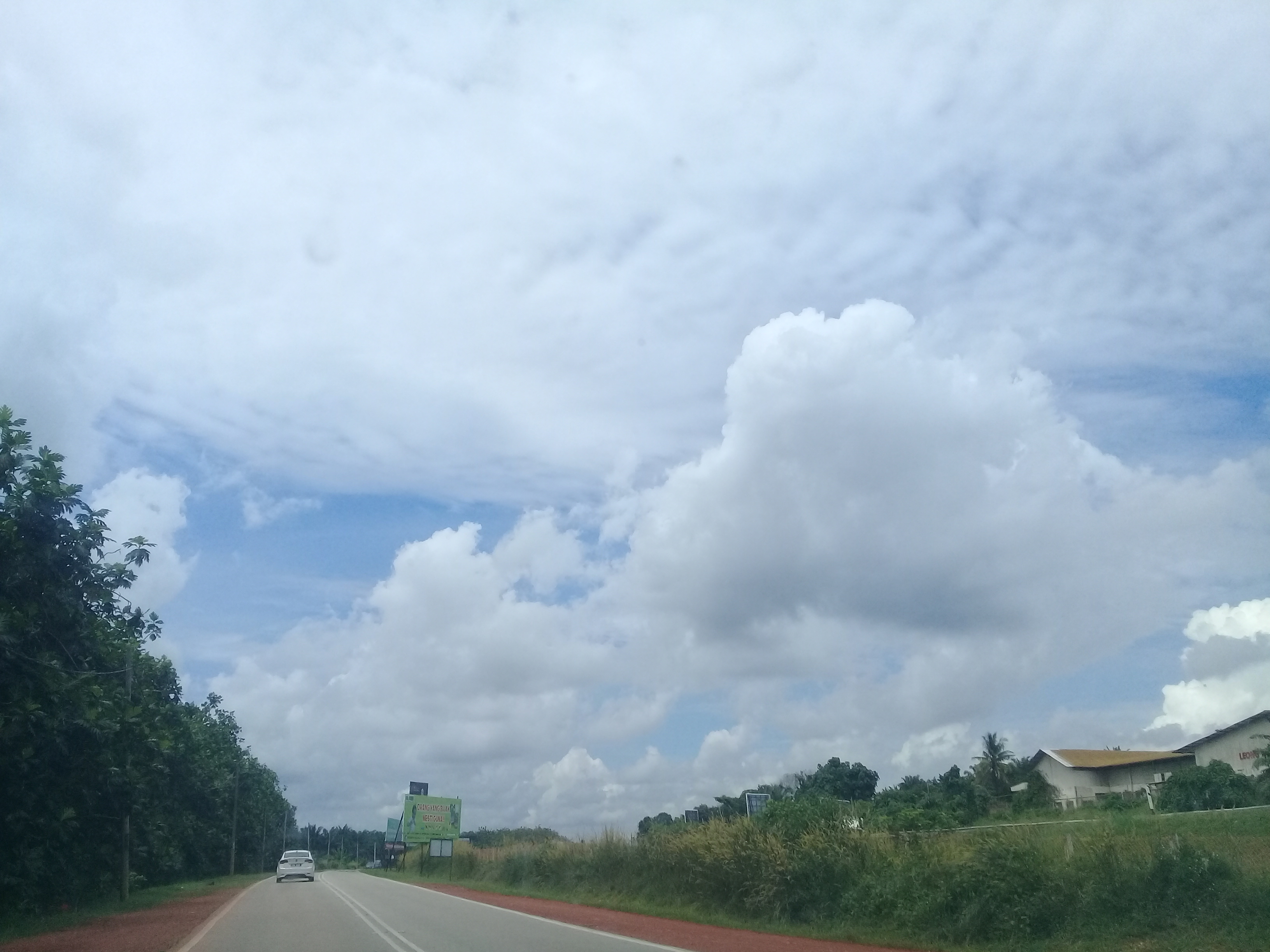

Route information
- Maintained by Malaysian Public Works Department (JKR)
- Length: 20.6 km (12.8 mi)

Major junctions
- West end: Pagoh
- J32 State Route J32; J128 State Route J128
- East end: Kangkar Senangar

Location
- Country: Malaysia
- Primary destinations: Kampung Tanah Merah

Highway system
- Highways in Malaysia; Expressways; Federal; State

Johor State Route J23, official name Jalan Kangkar Senanga, or well known as Jalan Pagoh–Parit Sulong is a major road in Johor, Malaysia. The 20.6 km (12.8 mi) state road connects Pagoh to Kangkar Senangar near Parit Sulong, motorists will need to travel another 4 km to Parit Sulong via J128 Jalan Kangar Senangar.

== History ==
The Malaysian Public Works Department (JKR) informed that four State Roads repairing at Jalan Kangkar Senanga (J23), Jalan Bekok (J150) in Segamat, and level raising works at Jalan Gelang Patah-Pendas (J4) and also Jalan Masai Lama (J10) which affected by the floodin March 2023, had been implemented as of December 2023.

== Features ==
- One of the alternative routes during festivals or public holiday

== Junction lists ==
The entire route is located in Johor.

Legend:

- I/C - Interchange, I/S - Intersection, RSA - Rest and service area, OBR - Overhead bridge restaurant, R/R - Restaurant and rest plaza, L/B - Layby, V/P - Vista point, TN - tunnel, T/P - Toll plaza, BR - Bridge
- C - Cloverleaf, S - Stack, T-A - Trumpet-A, T-B - Trumpet-B, DT - Directional-T/Y, SDT - Semi-Directional-T/Y, P-Y - Partial-Y, D - Diamond, P-C - Partial cloverleaf, D-D - Diverging diamond, D-R - Direct ramp

District	Km	Exit	Name	Destinations	Notes
Muar		I/S	Pagoh	J32 Johor State Route J32 – Muar, Bukit Pasir, Pagoh University Town, Lenga, Bukit Kepong, Segamat, Labis; J139 Johor State Route J139 – Kampung Raja, Makam Sultan Alauddin Riayat Syah I North–South Expressway Southern Route / AH2 – Kuala Lumpur, Malacca, Johor Bahru, Singapore	Junctions
Muar			Taman Sri Pagoh	Jalan Sri Pagoh 1-6 – Taman Sri Pagoh	
Muar			Pagoh Estate		
Muar		BR	Sungai Pagoh bridge		
Muar		RSA	Pagoh RSA (For staff only)		
Muar			Sri Medan Memorial Park	Sri Medan Memorial Park, Sri Medan Duck Hatchery	T-junctions
Muar			Dusun Damai	Dusun Damai, Chalet V	T-junctions
Muar			Kampung Tanah Merah		
Batu Pahat			Kangkar Senangar Estate		
Batu Pahat			Kangkar Senangar	J128 Johor State Route J128 – Kangka Senangar, Sri Medan, Bakri, Parit Sulong, Batu Pahat, Yong Peng; North–South Expressway Southern Route / AH2 – Kuala Lumpur, Malacca, Johor Bahru, Singapore	T-junctions
