= J19 =

J19 may refer to:

== Roads ==
- County Route J19 (California)
- Johor State Route J19, in Malaysia

== Vehicles ==
=== Locomotives ===
- GSR Class J19, an Irish steam locomotive
- LNER Class J19, a British steam locomotive class

=== Ships ===
- HSwMS Småland (J19), a Halland-class destroyer of the Swedish Navy
- INS Nirdeshak (J19), a Sandhayak-class survey ship of the Indian Navy

== Other uses ==
- J19 (journal), a scholarly journal
- Elongated square cupola, a Johnson solid (J_{19})
