= J35 =

J35 may refer to:

== Vehicles ==
=== Aircraft ===
- Beechcraft J35 Bonanza, an American civil utility aircraft
- Saab J 35 Draken, a Swedish fighter
- Shenyang J-35, a Chinese fighter

=== Locomotives ===
- LNER Class J35, a British steam locomotive class

=== Ships and boats ===
- J/35, a keelboat
- HMCS Nootka (J35), a Fundy-class minesweeper of the Royal Canadian Navy

== Other uses ==
- Allison J35, an American turbojet engine
- Elongated triangular orthobicupola, a Johnson solid (J_{35})
- Honda J35, a car engine
- Johor State Route J35, in Malaysia
- Tahlequah (orca), a killer whale
- Tonsillitis
