= Johor State Route J35 =

Road in Malaysia

Johor Route 35
- Jalan Sri Medan

Major junctions
- South end: Jalan Parit Sulong
- FT 24 Federal Route 24
- North end: Sri Medan

Location
- Country: Malaysia

Highway system
- Highways in Malaysia; Expressways; Federal; State

Johor State Route J35, Jalan Sri Medan is a major road in Johor, Malaysia.

== Junction lists ==
The entire route is located in Batu Pahat District, Johor.

Legend:

- I/C - Interchange, I/S - Intersection, RSA - Rest and service area, OBR - Overhead bridge restaurant, R/R - Restaurant and rest plaza, L/B - Layby, V/P - Vista point, TN - tunnel, T/P - Toll plaza, BR - Bridge
- C - Cloverleaf, S - Stack, T-A - Trumpet-A, T-B - Trumpet-B, DT - Directional-T/Y, SDT - Semi-Directional-T/Y, P-Y - Partial-Y, D - Diamond, P-C - Partial cloverleaf, D-D - Diverging diamond, D-R - Direct ramp

| Location | km | mi | Name | Destinations | Notes |
|---|---|---|---|---|---|
| Sri Medan | | | Jalan Parit Sulong | FT 24 Malaysia Federal Route 24 – Muar, Parit Sulong, Batu Pahat, Yong Peng; North–South Expressway Southern Route / AH2 – Kuala Lumpur, Johor Bahru | T-junctions |
| Sri Medan | | | Sri Medan | Jalan Pasar | |
1.000 mi = 1.609 km; 1.000 km = 0.621 mi
