= Fortune Dragon =

Statue in Batu Pahat, Johor, Malaysia

- 转运祥龍
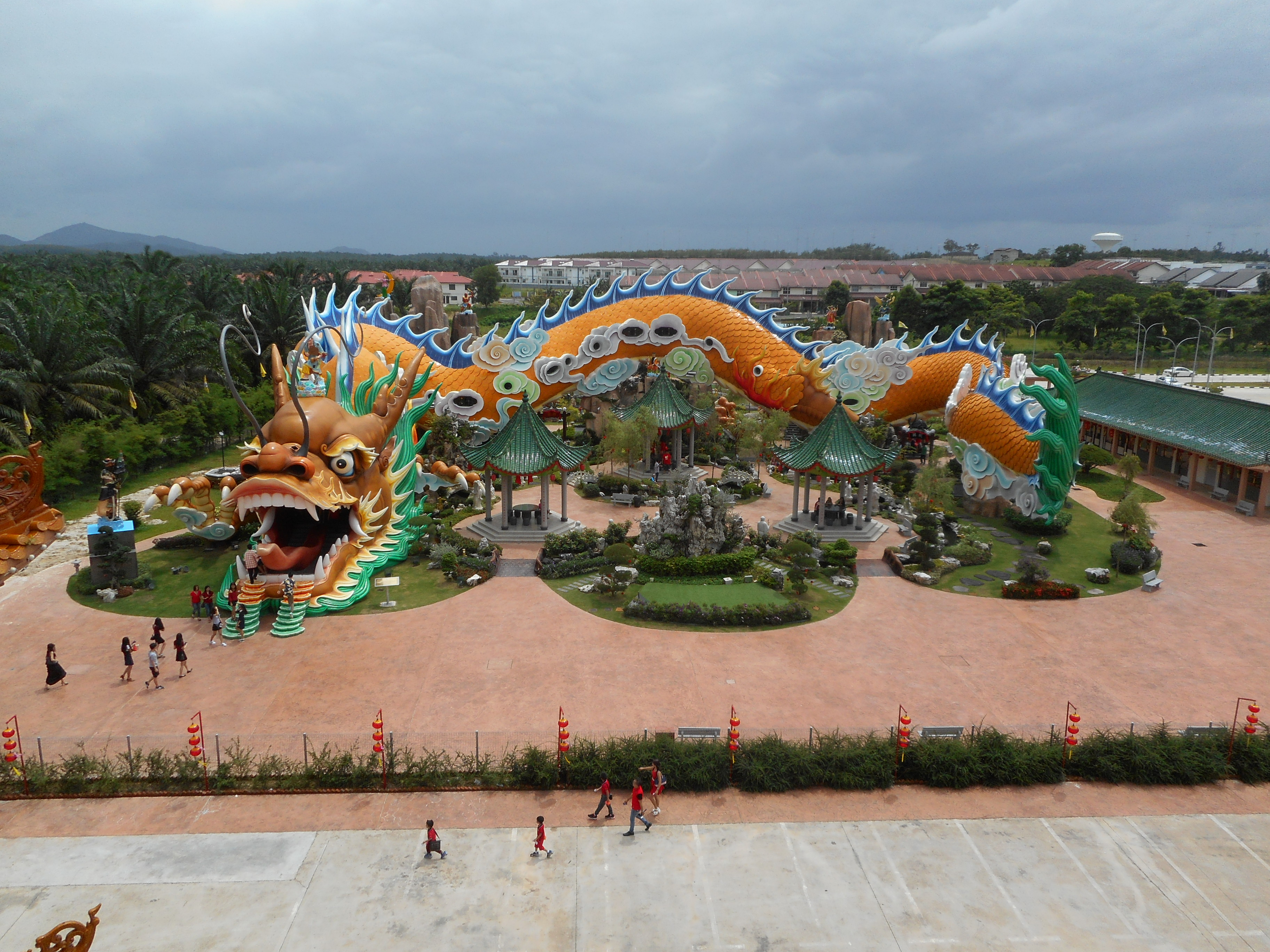

- Malaysia

Religion
- Ownership: Che Ann Khor Yong Peng Association
- Governing body: Che Ann Khor Yong Peng Association

Location
- Location: Yong Peng, Batu Pahat, Johor, Malaysia
- Interactive map of Fortune Dragon
- Coordinates: 2°1′13.3″N 103°4′52.2″E

Architecture
- Style: dragon
- General contractor: Hua May Art Engineering
- Groundbreaking: 2013
- Completed: 12 November 2016
- Construction cost: MYR8 million

Specifications
- Length: 115 meters
- Height (max): 4.8 meters
- Site area: 1.6 hectare
- Materials: glass fiber reinforced concrete

The Fortune Dragon or Prosperity Dragon (Malay: Naga Kemakmuran; Chinese: 转运祥龍) is a dragon statue in Yong Peng, Batu Pahat District, Johor, Malaysia. At a length of 115 meters, it is the world's largest and longest dragon tunnel in the world. The status is located within the Che Ann Khor Yong Peng Association building area.

== History ==
The statue sits on a 4-acre of land which was purchased in 2012. In 2013, the groundbreaking ceremony was launched and the first pile was driven into the ground on 13 December the same year. The statue was constructed with a cost of MYR8 million and was constructed for 1.5 years. It was launched on 12 November 2016 by Johor Sultan Ibrahim Ismail accompanied by Crown Prince Tunku Ismail.

== Architecture ==
The statue was designed with glass fiber reinforced concrete. It has height ranging from 3.6 to 4.8 meters with 144 steps inside. It has an overall length of 107 meters, with the distance separating the head and the tail of 37 meters. It has three undulations and three twists. The width of the mouth is 2.5 meters and decorated with 36 sharp teeth. The maximum internal width and height of the dragon body is 3.7 meters and 5.5 meters respectively. The highest middle platform is 8.2 meters above ground level.

Its exterior is covered with around 3,330 ceramic scales, which were imported from Quanzhou, China. Its interior is decorated with 42 Chinese paintings along the 144 steps, 17 steps platform and 16 windows.

It is located in a 1.6-hectare (4.0-acre) plot of land which also consists of Fortune Garden. The area has other amenities and parking lots.
