= Sri Gading =

Sri Gading Seri Gading
- Suburb of Batu Pahat

Other transcription(s)
  - Jawi: سري ڬاديڠ
  - Chinese: 四加亭
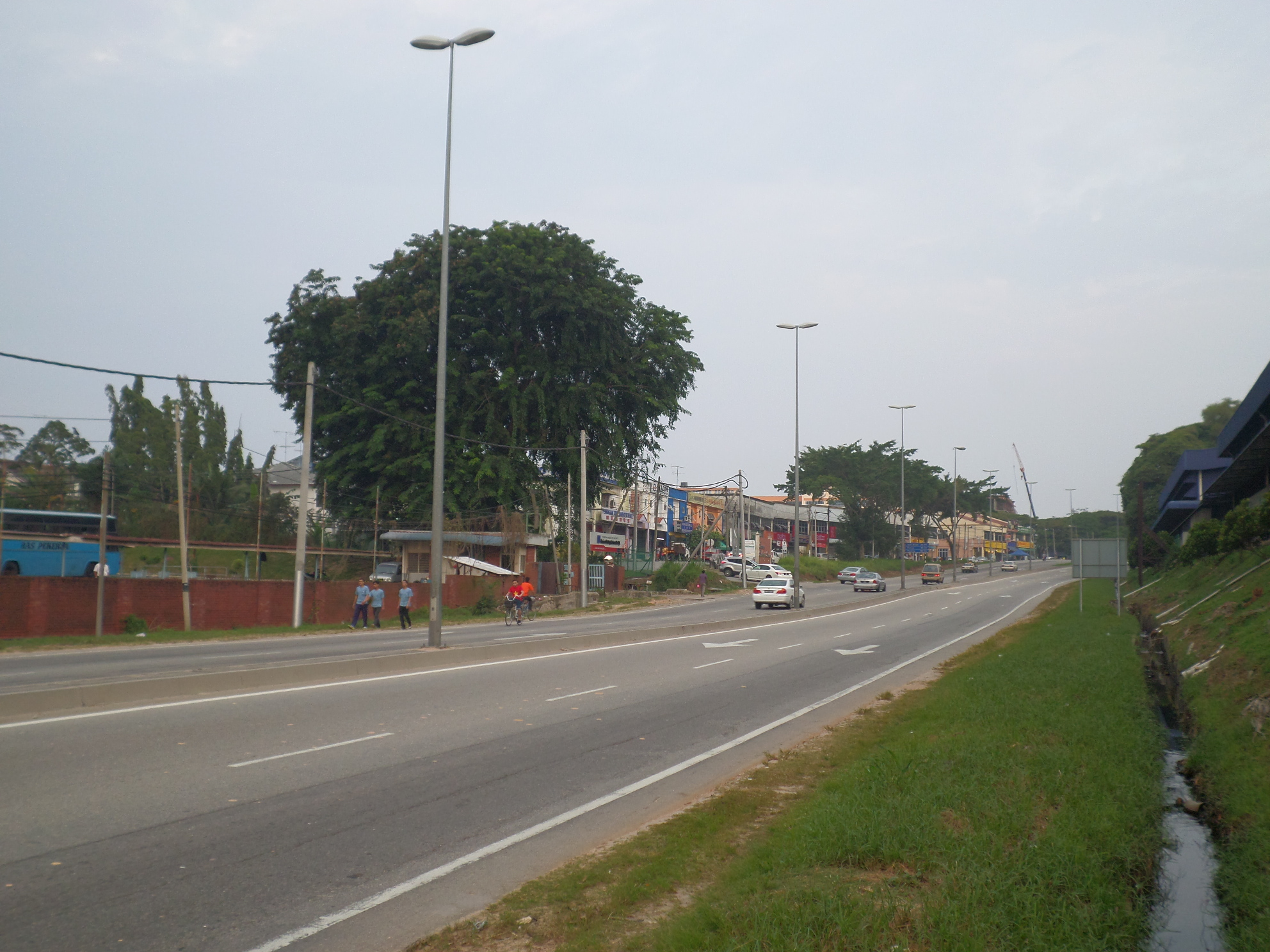

- Location of Sri Gading Sri Gading (Peninsular Malaysia) Sri Gading (Malaysia)
- Coordinates: 1.8514604°N 103.0513334°E
- Country: Malaysia
- State: Johor
- District: Batu Pahat
- Electorate: P.149 Sri Gading
- Time zone: UTC+8 (MST)
  - Summer (DST): Not observed

Sri Gading or Seri Gading is a mukim and parliamentary constituency in Batu Pahat District, Johor, Malaysia, located along Jalan Batu Pahat-Kluang (Federal Route 50). It lies south-east of Batu Pahat town, north-west of Ayer Hitam and west of Yong Peng. It is also a name of one of 14 parishes in Johor.

== Name ==
The name Seri Gading means 'The Gorgeous Ivory' in Malay. The origin of this name can be traced back to the time when Sultan Ibrahim hunts an elephant at this place, and was impressed by the luster of the ivory. However, it is not easy to spot elephants in Sri Gading today, even back since the late-1970s.

== Geography ==
Sri Gading in Batu Pahat District

The mukim spans over an area of 192 km^{2}.

== Politics ==
This is the list of parliamentary constituencies (P.) followed by the state assemblies (N.) in Sri Gading. See List of Malaysian electoral districts for updated information.

- P.149 Sri Gading (inclusive of Tongkang Pechah)
- N.21 Parit Yaani
- N.22 Parit Raja

== Economy ==
Sri Gading is famous for its local delicacies and textile industry.

Other local brand like CCS Food & Beverage Manufacturing Sdn Bhd, Miaow Miaow Food Products Sdn Bhd , New Star Food Industries Sdn Bhd, PCCS, LY Furniture & Ramatex, multinational corporation like Fujitsu, Sharp Roxy & J.R. Courtenay had their factories in Sri Gading.

== Tourist attractions ==
Sri Gading does not have a lot of rivers since the biggest river in Sri Gading was Simpang Kanan River, but there are more than 20 bridges across this small town. taking the heavy responsibility of linking up houses estates and business centres on both ends.

The new township area named Pura Kencana that are developed by Genting Group. There are many facilities there such as restaurants, furniture shops, 7-Eleven, hardware shops and even a hotel named Harmoni Inn.

== Transportation ==
The mukim is accessible by Causeway Link route 8 from Ayer Hitam to Batu Pahat Town.

== See also ==
- Batu Pahat
