= Johor State Route J19 =

Road in Malaysia

Johor Route 19
- Jalan Simpang Lima–Parit Sulong
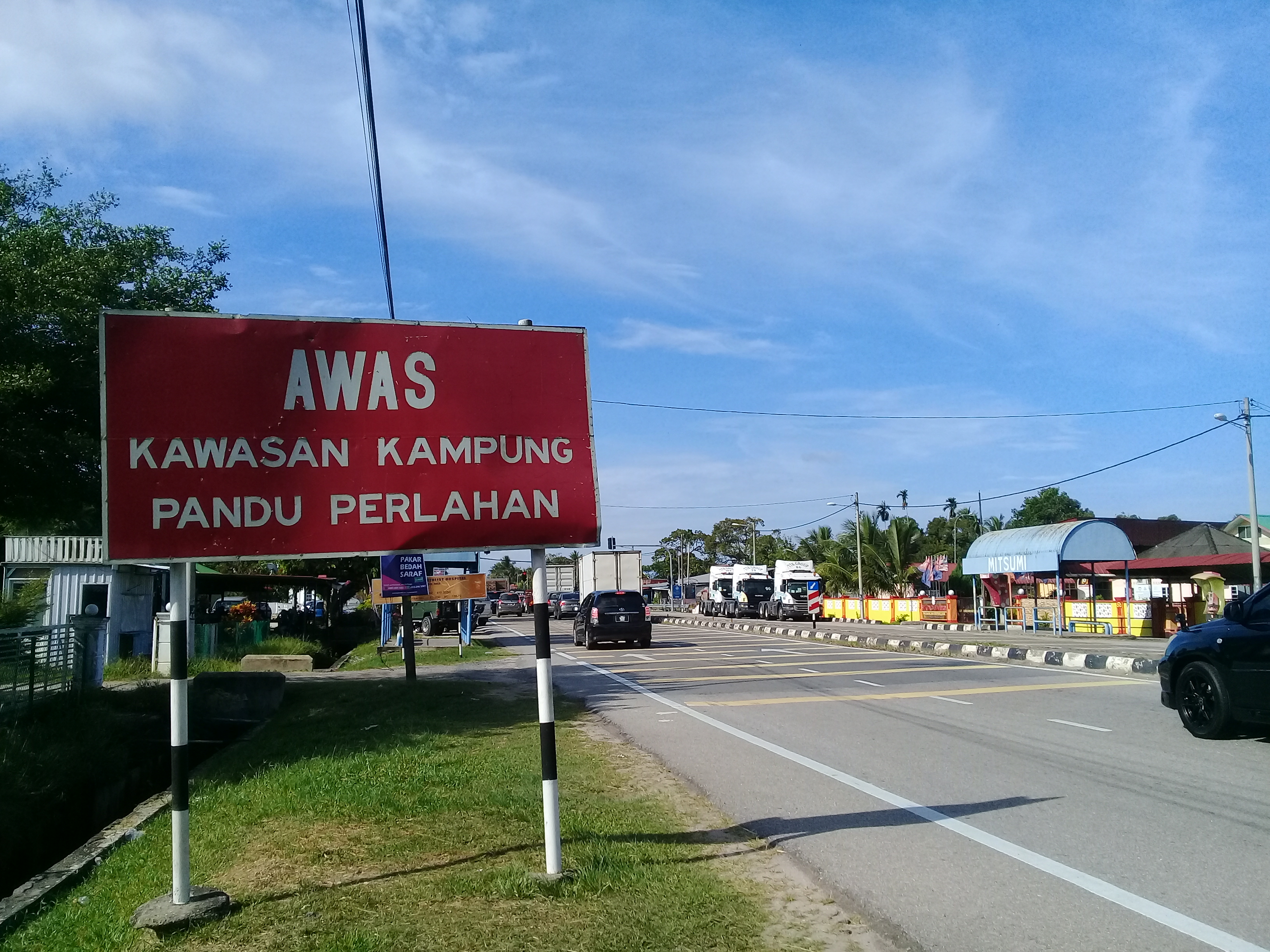

Major junctions
- North end: Parit Sulong
- FT 24 Federal Route 24; J129 Jalan Sungai Nibong; FT 5 Federal Route 5
- South end: Simpang Lima

Location
- Country: Malaysia
- Primary destinations: Peserai, Batu Pahat

Highway system
- Highways in Malaysia; Expressways; Federal; State

Johor State Route J19, Jalan Simpang Lima–Parit Sulong is a major road in Johor, Malaysia.

== History ==
Jalan Simpang Lima–Parit Sulong becomes one of the E32 West Coast Expressway southern extensions proposed interchanges in Johor alignment.

== Junction lists ==
The entire route is located in Batu Pahat District, Johor.

Legend:

- I/C - Interchange, I/S - Intersection, RSA - Rest and service area, OBR - Overhead bridge restaurant, R/R - Restaurant and rest plaza, L/B - Layby, V/P - Vista point, TN - tunnel, T/P - Toll plaza, BR - Bridge
- C - Cloverleaf, S - Stack, T-A - Trumpet-A, T-B - Trumpet-B, DT - Directional-T/Y, SDT - Semi-Directional-T/Y, P-Y - Partial-Y, D - Diamond, P-C - Partial cloverleaf, D-D - Diverging diamond, D-R - Direct ramp

Location	km	mi	Name	Destinations	Notes
Parit Sulong			Parit Sulong	FT 24 Malaysia Federal Route 24 – Muar, Tangkak, Malacca Town, Pagoh, Yong Peng, Segamat; North–South Expressway Southern Route / AH2 – Kuala Lumpur, Malacca, Johor Bahru, Singapore	T-junctions
Parit Sulong			Kampung Penghulu		
Parit Sulong			Parit Sulong-WCE	West Coast Expressway	Under planning
Parit Sulong			Jalan Sungai Nibong	J129 Jalan Sungai Nibong – Kampung Sungai Nibong, Semerah	T-junctions
Parit Sulong			Simpang Lima	FT 5 Malaysia Federal Route 5 – Muar, Malacca Town, Parit Jawa, Batu Pahat, Ayer Hitam, Kluang, Mersing, Pontian, Kukup, Johor Bahru	T-junctions
1.000 mi = 1.609 km; 1.000 km = 0.621 mi: Proposed
