= Johor State Route J133 =

Road in Malaysia

Johor Route 133
- Jalan Sri Tanjung

Major junctions
- North end: Simpang Jeram
- FT 24 Federal Route 24; J132 State Route J132; J131 State Route J131
- South end: Bukit Mor

Location
- Country: Malaysia
- Primary destinations: Parit Bakar, Parit Jawa

Highway system
- Highways in Malaysia; Expressways; Federal; State

Johor State Route J133, Jalan Sri Tanjung is a major road in Johor, Malaysia.

== Junction lists ==
The entire route is located in Muar District, Johor.

Legend:

- I/C - Interchange, I/S - Intersection, RSA - Rest and service area, OBR - Overhead bridge restaurant, R/R - Restaurant and rest plaza, L/B - Layby, V/P - Vista point, TN - tunnel, T/P - Toll plaza, BR - Bridge
- C - Cloverleaf, S - Stack, T-A - Trumpet-A, T-B - Trumpet-B, DT - Directional-T/Y, SDT - Semi-Directional-T/Y, P-Y - Partial-Y, D - Diamond, P-C - Partial cloverleaf, D-D - Diverging diamond, D-R - Direct ramp

Location	km	mi	Destinations	Notes
Simpang Jeram			FT 24 Malaysia Federal Route 24 – Muar, Malacca, Pagoh, Bakri, Parit Sulong, Yong Peng	T-junctions
Parit Bakar Darat			J132 Johor State Route J132 – Parit Bakar, Parit Bakar Laut	T-junctions
Bukit Mor			J131 Jalan Bukit Mor – Parit Jawa, Batu Pahat, Bakri, Parit Sulong	T-junctions
1.000 mi = 1.609 km; 1.000 km = 0.621 mi
