= Bukit Bakri =

Town in Muar, Johor, Malaysia

Coordinates: 2°03′N 102°40′E

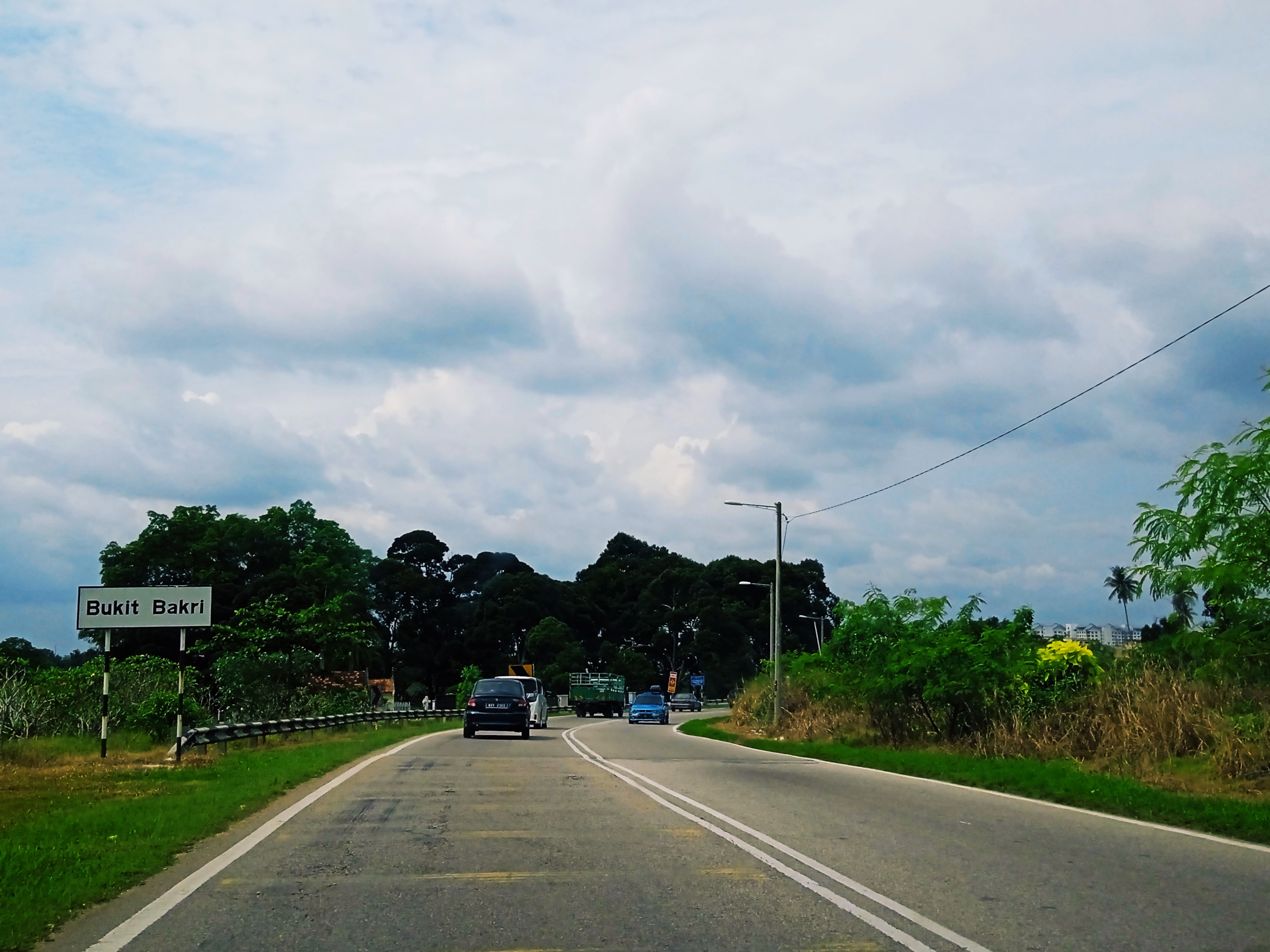
Bukit Bakri sign along FT 24 (Jalan Bakri).

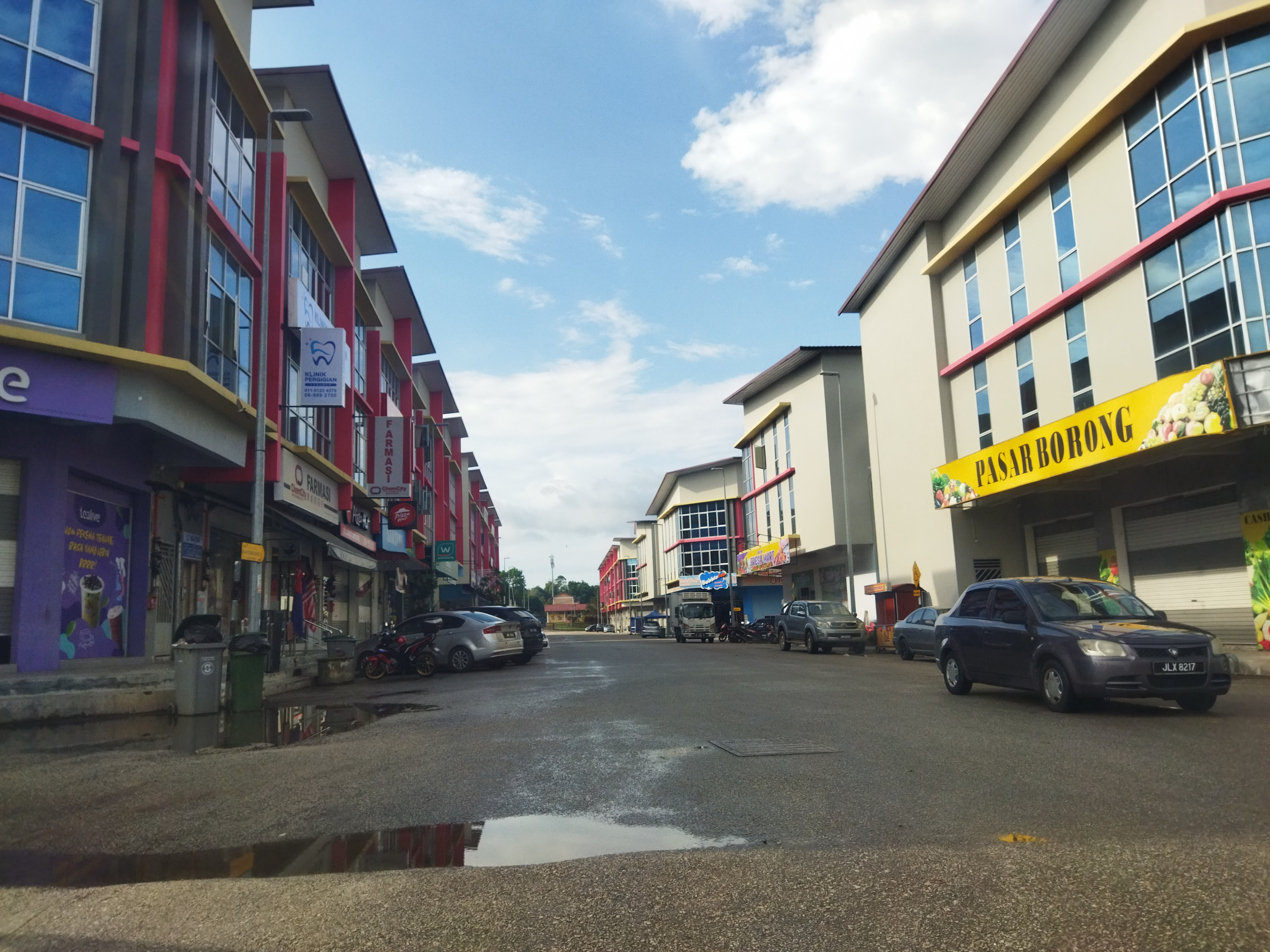
Bukit Bakri

Bakri or often Bukit Bakri (Jawi: بوكيت بكري; Chinese: 巴口) is a town in Muar District, Johor, Malaysia. It is located along Federal Route 24 in Muar district, just ten kilometres east of Muar town. In 1991, it had a population of 10,000, which doubled by the 2000 census to 20,123. Now Bukit Bakri population is 30,280.

Bukit Bakri is located on the eastern end of Jalan Bakri (part of Federal Highway 24), which is the main road that connects Bakri Town to Bandar Maharani (Muar City Centre). The name 'Bakri' is believed to have been derived from the name of Sultan Abu Bakar of Johor - the name or alias dedicated to him as the present for his birthday by Dato' Muhammad Salleh Bin Prang. Many people were not aware that Jalan Bakri was one of the straightest roads in the State of Johore at that time. This showcases the ability of the local engineers in the late 19th century.

There are many Muslim, Chinese, Hindu and Christian cemeteries in Bakri town including the historic Japanese war cemetery from World War II which has become the obvious landmark of the small town. The largest clan in the local Chinese population belongs to the surname "Toh" (杜) in Hokkien or "Du" in Chinese, and there is a prominent Chinese temple known as Siang Kong Shan Temple dedicated to Du Fu Da Ren.

== Schools ==
=== Secondary school ===
- Sekolah Menengah Kebangsaan Bukit Naning
- Sekolah Menengah Kebangsaan Tun Dr Ismail

=== Primary school ===
- Sekolah Kebangsaan Parit Zain
- Sekolah Kebangsaan Ayer Hitam Batu 18
- Sekolah Kebangsaan Ayer Hitam Batu 15
- Sekolah Jenis Kebangsaan Pu Nan (Cina)

PUNAN

- Sekolah Jenis Kebangsaan (Cina) Chin Terh
- Sekolah Jenis Kebangsaan (Cina) Yu Eng
