= Parit Yaani =

Town in Johor, Malaysia

Coordinates: 1.9272492°N 103.0208779°E

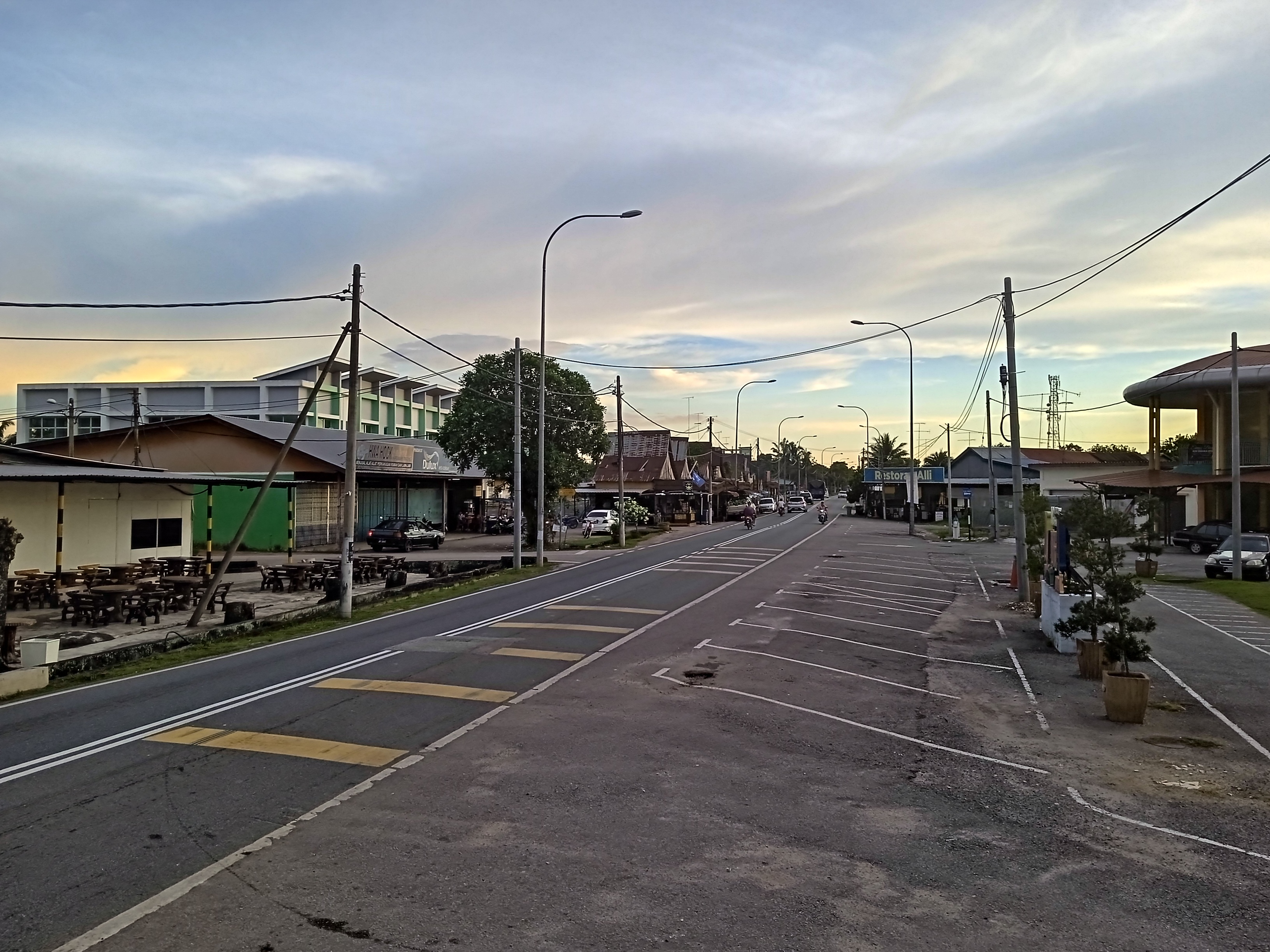
Parit Yaani

Parit Yaani (Jawi: ڤاريت ياءاني; Chinese: 巴力亚尼) is a small town in Batu Pahat District, Johor, Malaysia. It is located within the parliamentary constituency of Sri Gading.

Parit Andin is a village of about 200 people in 50 families within Parit Yaani.
