= Sri Medan =

- Town

Other transcription(s)
  - Jawi: سري ميدن
  - Chinese: 铁山
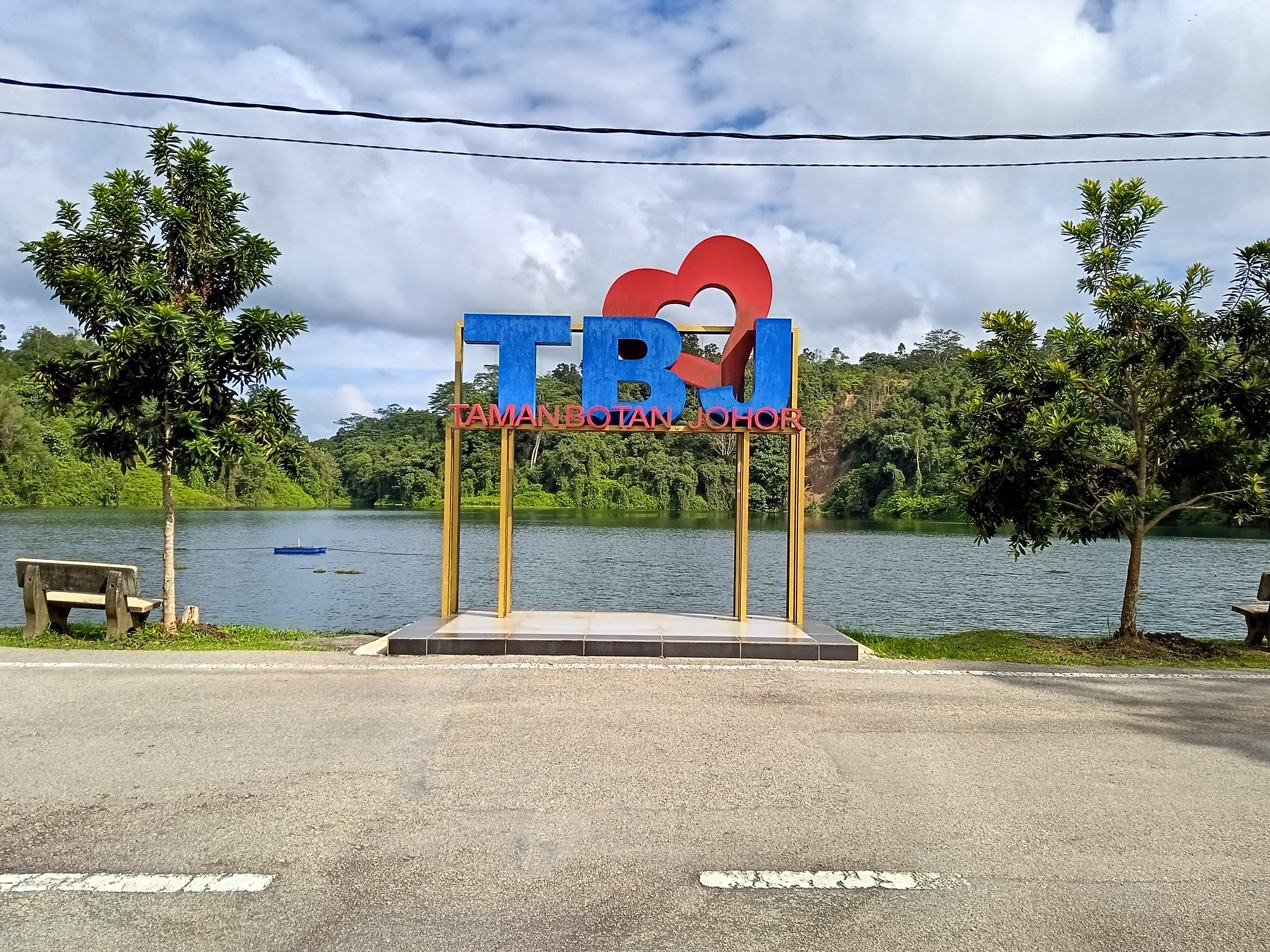
- Johor Botanical Garden in Sri Medan

- Flag

- Location in Malaysia Sri Medan (Peninsular Malaysia)
- Coordinates: 1.9849548°N 102.9569216°E
- Country: Malaysia
- State: Johor
- City: Batu Pahat

Government
  - Local Authority: Majlis Daerah Yong Peng
- Time zone: UTC+8 (MST)
- Postcode: 83400
- Dialling code: +607
- Police: Batu Pahat
- Fire: Batu Pahat

Sri Medan (Jawi: سري ميدن; Chinese: 铁山) is a main town in Batu Pahat District, Johor, Malaysia. Long ago, it was a famous bauxite mine in Johore.
