= Parit Sulong =

Parit Sulong (ڤاريت سولوڠ)
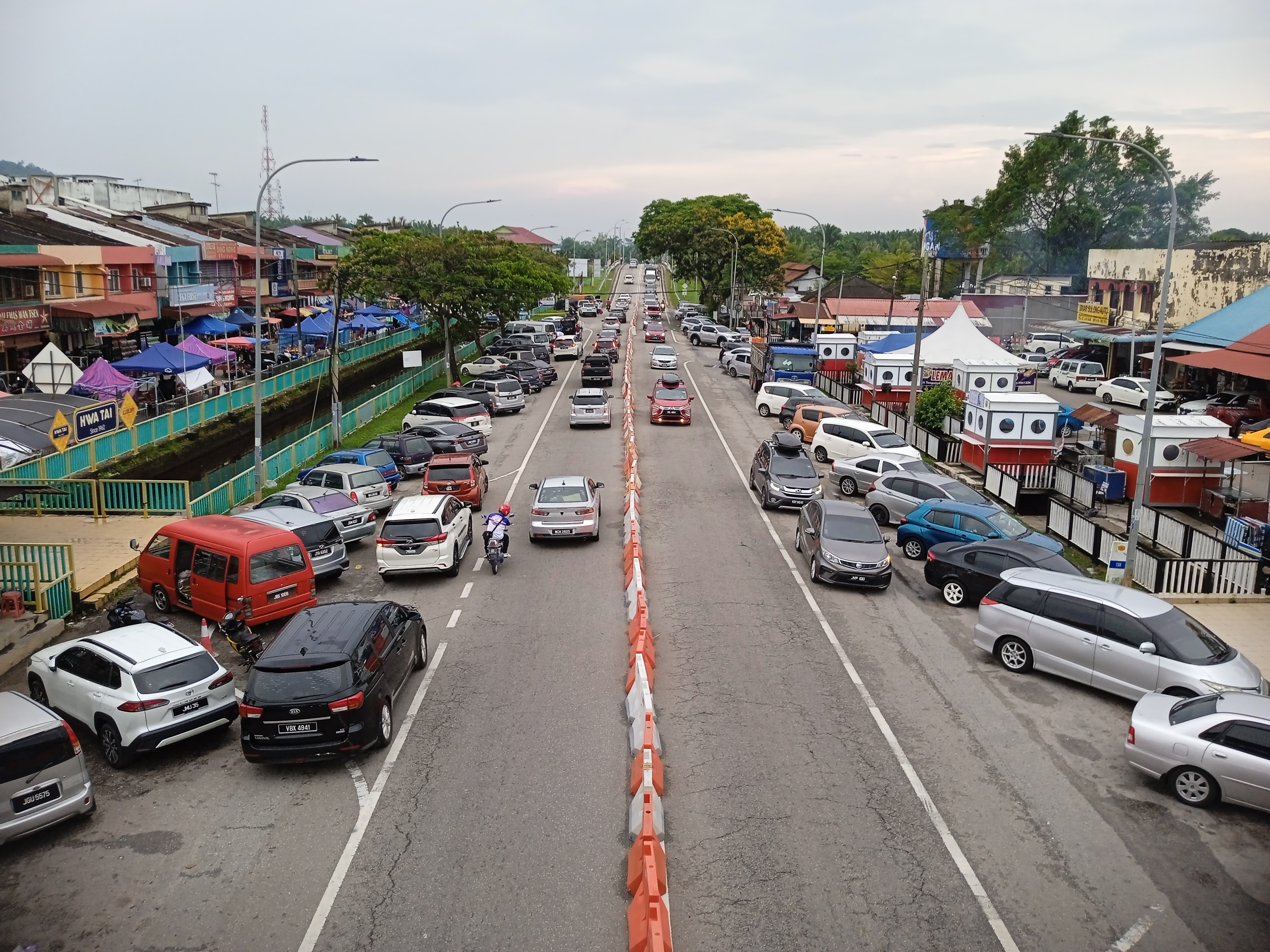

- Location within Malaysia
- Coordinates: 1°58′54″N 102°52′42″E
- Country: Malaysia
- State: Johor
- District: Batu Pahat
- Postal Code: 83500
- International Calling Code: 07-41xxxxx

Parit Sulong is a small town in Batu Pahat District, Johor, Malaysia on the Simpang Kiri River, 30 km (19 mi) east of Muar. The historical Parit Sulong Bridge constructed during World War II is a main feature in that town. Parit Sulong sits approximately 18 km (11 mi) from Bandar Penggaram, Batu Pahat, capital of Batu Pahat district.

== History ==
The first large massacre of 161 Australian troops by Japanese forces occurred at Parit Sulong on the west coast of Malaya on 22 January 1942. Wounded survivors from the Battle of Muar who could not travel on foot were left at Parit Sulong when the remnants of the greatly outnumbered force of Australians and Indians escaped from the Japanese who surrounded them.

The Japanese soldiers are said to have kicked and hit the prisoners with rifle butts. They forced them into an overcrowded shed and denied them food, water and medical attention. At sunset, those able to walk were roped or wired together and were led away. The Japanese collected petrol from the Allied vehicles which had been left stranded, shot and bayoneted their prisoners, threw petrol upon them and ignited it. The officer who ordered the massacre, Lt General Takuma Nishimura, was tried and convicted of war crimes and executed by hanging on 11 June 1951.

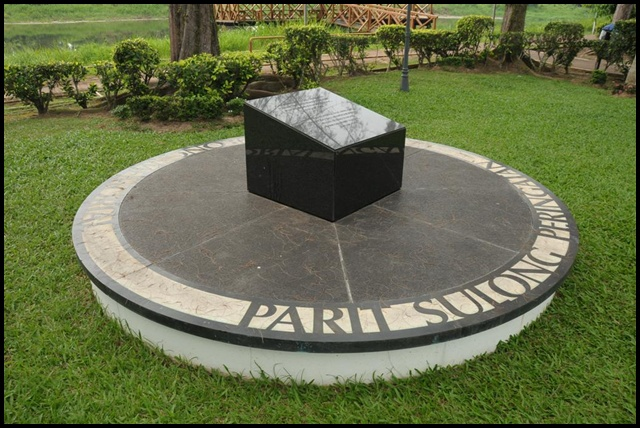
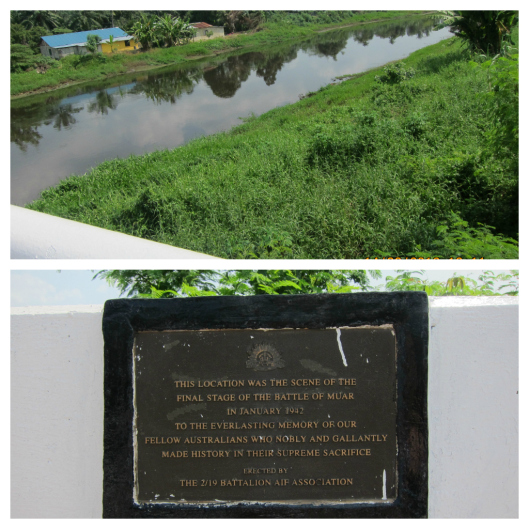
Parit Sulong War Memorial, commemorating the Battle of Muar and Parit Sulong Massacre
