= Muar (town) =

Muar Bandar Maharani
- Municipality, royal capital and district capital
- Bandar Maharani, The Royal Town; Bandar Maharani Bandar Diraja
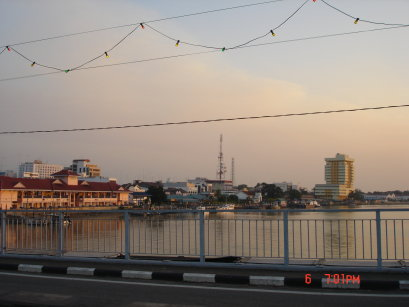
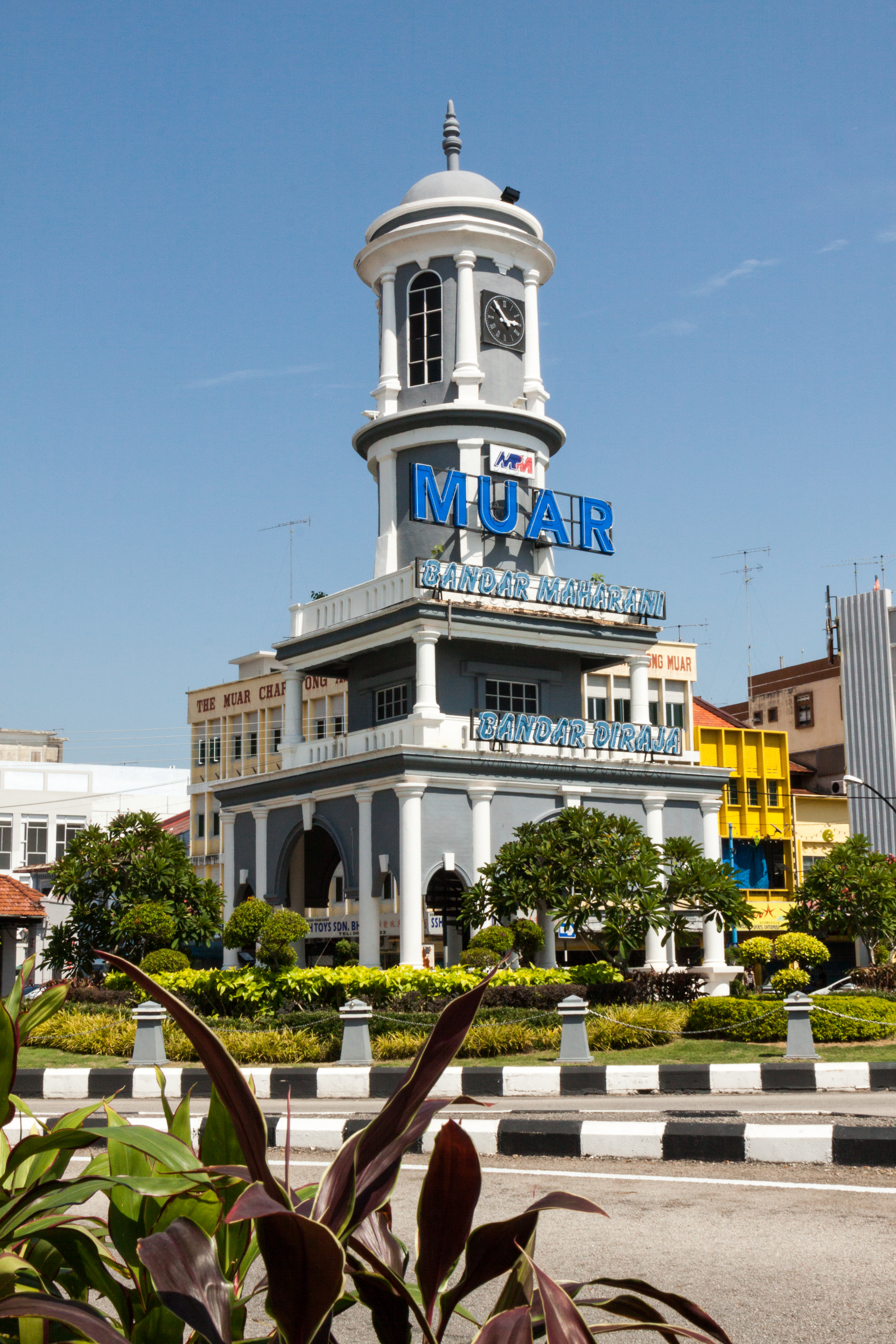
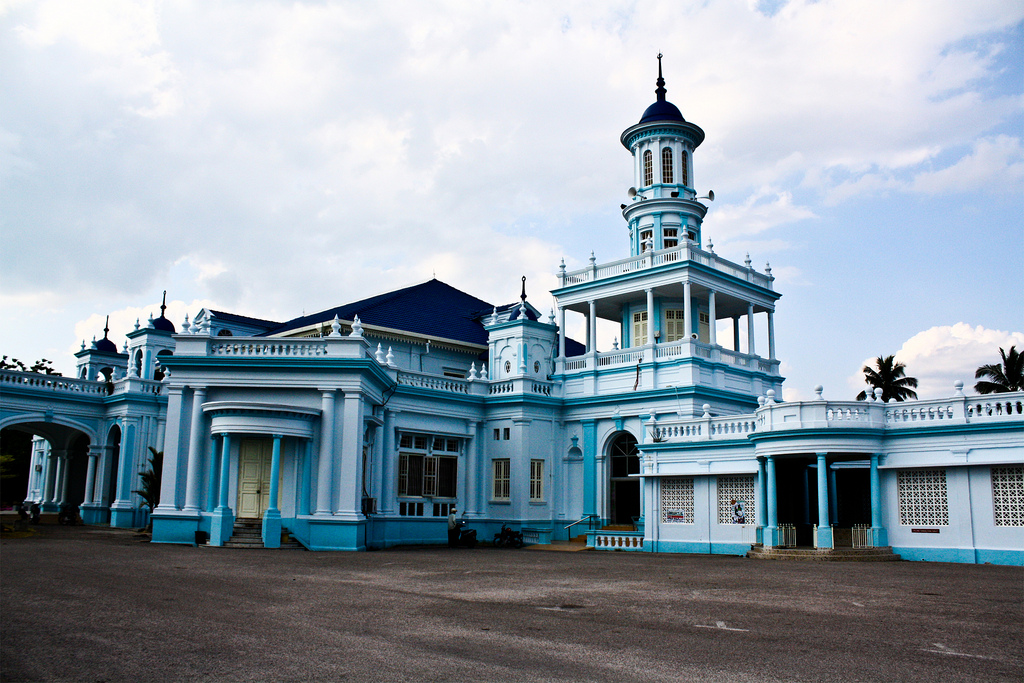
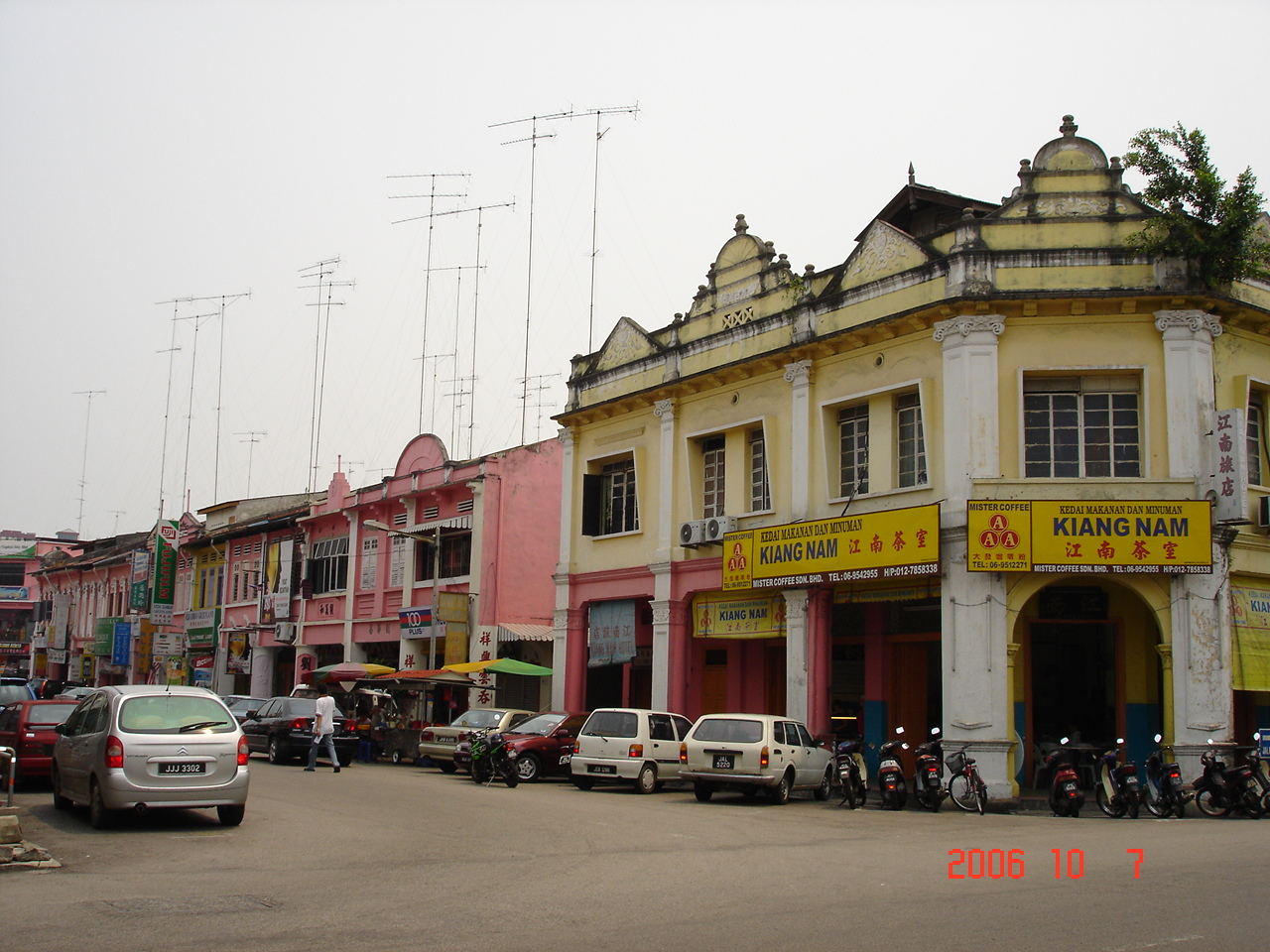
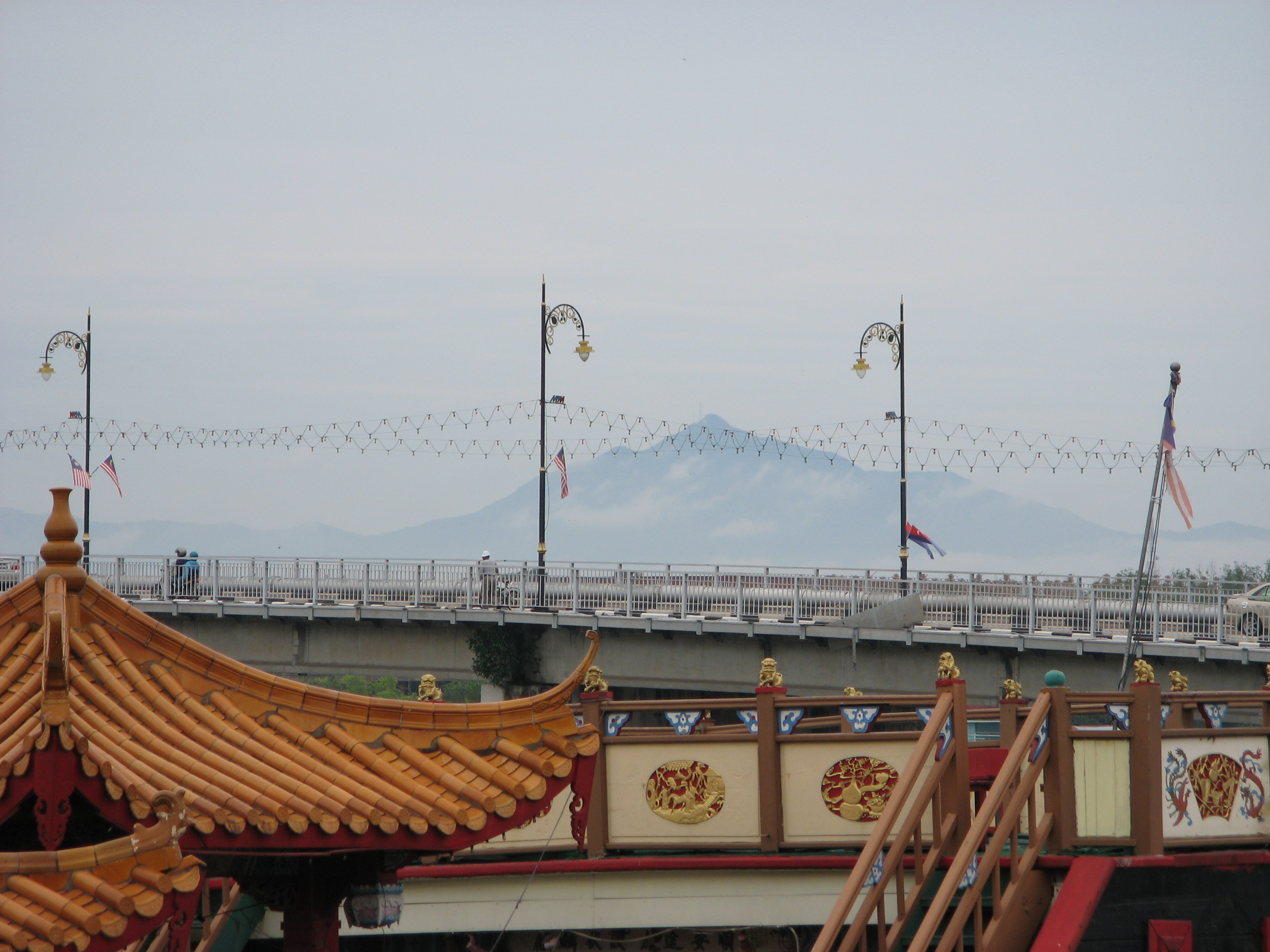
- Clockwise from top: Downtown view across the Muar River, Sultan Ibrahim Jamek Mosque, Sultan Ismail Bridge, colonial-era shophouses, clock tower

- Flag Coat of arms
- Nickname: Bandar Maharani Bandar Diraja
- Motto: Cekap, Amanah, Dinamik, Makmur (Malay) "Efficient, Trustworthy, Dynamic, Prosperous" (motto of Muar Municipal Council)
- Location of Muar in Johor
- Muar in Johor Muar (Malaysia) Muar (Southeast Asia) Muar (Asia)
- Coordinates: 2°3′00″N 102°34′00″E
- Country: Malaysia
- State: Johor
- District: Muar
- Township: 1885
- Municipality: 2001

Government
  - Type: Municipal council
  - Body: Muar Municipal Council
  - Yang-di Pertua: Norrizam Muhamad

Area
  - Total: 1,376 km^{2} (531 sq mi)
- Elevation: 36.88 m (121.0 ft)

Population (2020)
  - Total: 314,776
  - Density: 228.8/km^{2} (592.5/sq mi)
  - Demonym: Muarian
- Time zone: UTC+8 (MST)
  - Summer (DST): Not observed
- Postal code: 84000
- National calling code: 06-95xxxxx to 06-98xxxxx
- License plate prefix: Jxx
- Website: www.mpmuar.gov.my www.johordt.gov.my/pdmuar

Muar (Muarian dialect: Muo), officially known by the sobriquet Bandar Maharani ("Empress Town"), is a historical town and the capital of Muar District, Johor, Malaysia, situated by the estuary of the eponymous Muar River. It is the fourth largest urban area in Johor, after Johor Bahru, Batu Pahat and Kluang.

On 5 February 2012, Muar was declared as the royal town of Johor by Sultan Ibrahim Sultan Iskandar.

Muar is one of the cleanest cities in Southeast Asia, having won the ASEAN Clean Tourist City Standard Award in 2017 and 2022. It is regarded as one of the most popular tourist attractions in Malaysia to be visited and explored for its cuisine, culture and historical prewar buildings.

== Toponymy ==
While Muar was historically recognized by other names, contemporary etymological theories generally attribute the origin of its current name to its strategic location at the mouth of the Muar River:

- Teluk Dalam: Muar was formerly known as Teluk Dalam ("deep bay"), attributing to its location at the estuary or the structure of the mouth of the Muar River which is wide open and deep; based on an excerpt in one part of Hikayat Malim Deman:

Muar belum bernama Muar, Muar bernama Teluk Dalam

"Muar has not been named Muar, Muar was called Teluk Dalam"

- Muara: The name Muar is said to be the contracted form of the word muara (Malay for estuary).
- Muak: Means "bored" or "tired", alluding to the tediousness of paddling the boat along the river, which is large and curvy by the local people in the early days. The people started calling the river and place Muar, deriving from the adjective "muak" after a long time since then.
- Bukit Mor: There is a hill not far from the town near Parit Jawa in the south by the name of Bukit Mor, which is thought to be the origin of the name Muar.

On 12 August 1887, Maharaja Abu Bakar officially founded the modern township of Muar and bestowed the name Bandar Maharani ("Town of the Empress") to honour Maharani Fatimah. The Maharani attended the grand inauguration ceremony, which symbolised Muar's status as Johor's second major urban centre and district after the state capital, Johor Bahru.

== History ==
Formerly Flag of the State Commissioner for Muar (Malay: Bendera Orang Besar Daerah Muar); More information This flag now has been re-introduced back as Muar Flag by the Muar District Office.

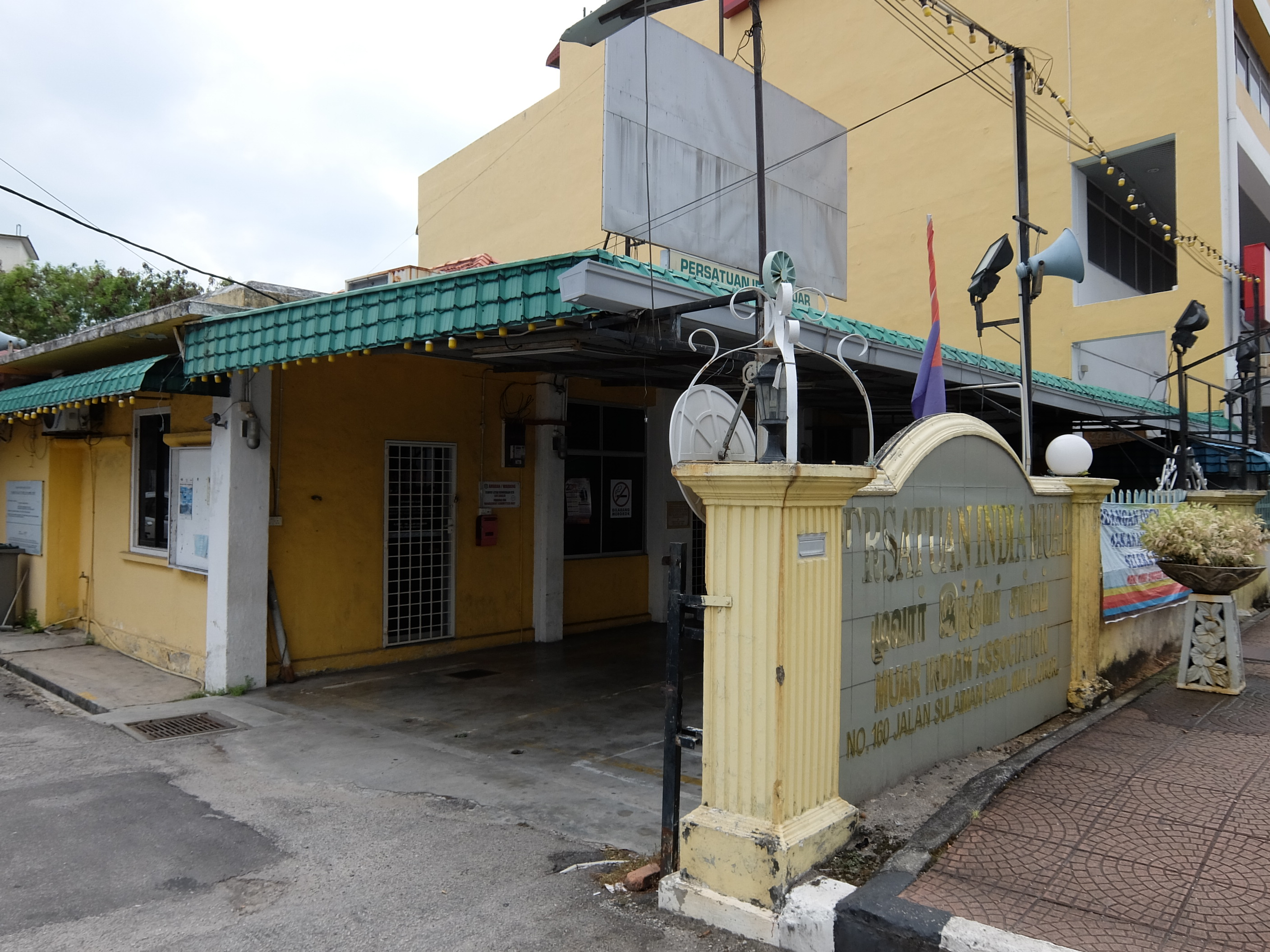
Muar Indian Society

=== Early history ===
Muar is rich in history as mentioned in many historical records and archaeological works. It is believed that the history of Muar began much earlier, predating the establishment of the Sultanate of Malacca.

In 1361, it was claimed that Muar was a part of the Majapahit Empire. Another account also stated that Parameswara, upon his exile from Singapura before proceeding to found Malacca, had established several settlements at Kota Buruk, Pagoh, Ulu Muar and Muar before reaching the place that would become Malacca. Historically, Muar was also where the deposed heir of the Malacca Sultanate escaped to in 1511 following the Portuguese invasion launched from Goa by Afonso de Albuquerque. Muar played a role in resisting the Portuguese occupation of Malacca; the Kubu Bentayan fortress was erected by Sultan Mahmud Shah to repel seaborne invasions, before he was defeated and retreated further inland to Pagoh, this time witnessing the fall of his empire.

The Portuguese occupied Muar soon after and built a fortress, Fortaleza de Muar, to defend the colony against the attacks from the Dutch and Aceh instead at the same strategic site of Bentayan. The British did just about the same thing at the Muar River site near Bentayan in defence against the advance of the Japanese Imperial Army in the Battle of Muar in World War II.

During the time of the beginning of Bugis immigration from Sulawesi and their influence in the Johor Sultanate, the five Bugis warrior princes – Daeng Marewah, Daeng Parani, Daeng Chelak, Daeng Menambun and Daeng Kemasi – said to have come to settle in Liang Batu, Lenga, before they and their descendants became influential Temenggungs and even rulers later.

Muar was also attested in many historical sources, varying from old maps, poems, epics, manuscripts and books :

- Mpu Prapanca (Nagarakertagama, 1361) : written in 1361 by Mpu Prapanca, a Buddhist monk and royal priest of the Majapahit court, mentions Muar as a colony under Majapahit subdued by Hayam Wuruk and his prime minister, Gajah Mada (1350 to 1389).
- João de Barros (Decades of Asia, 1553) : João de Barros, who wrote in 1553 in his second Décadas da Ásia ("Decades of Asia"), a history of the Portuguese in India and Asia, stated that Paramicura (Parameswara), who was driven away from Temasik after he assassinated the representative of the King of Ayutthaya, Temagi; had escaped in exile and stopped in Muar, establishing a settlement named Pagoh.
- Tun Sri Lanang (Malay Annals, Shellabear version): It states that Temasik – also went by Singapura – during the reign of Parameswara was defeated by Majapahit, forcing him and his family, including his followers, to flee northwards to Pagoh and set up two fortresses on the banks of the Muar River, the Biawak Busuk and Kota Buruk. After that, they moved further inland to Sening Ujong and finally established the Malacca Sultanate. In 1488, Sultan Alauddin Riayat Shah I (1477–1488) has died and laid to rest in Pagoh during a visit, earning him the posthumous title Sultan Mangkat Di Muar ("The Sultan Who Died in Muar").
- Tomé Pires (Suma Oriental, 1512–1515) :Tomé Pires wrote a landmark book on Asian trade, the Suma Oriental que trata do Mar Roxo até aos Chins ("Summa of the East, from the Red Sea up to the Chinese") in Malacca and India between 1512 and 1515, completed before the death of Afonso de Albuquerque (December 1515), which highlighted the emergence of Parameswara replacing his father, Raja Sam Agi as the ruler of Palembang and later attacked by the king of Majapahit, King Batara Tamavill for declaring himself as 'Mjeura' (those who dare) before fled to Temasik (present day Singapore) where he killed King of Ayutthaya's representative, Temagi, and he secretly ruled Temasik for 5 years. Fearing of a retaliatory attack by the King of Ayutthaya, he abdicated and fled to Pagoh with his 1,000 followers, living there for 6 years when the Seletar people were still occupying Malacca.
- An old Portuguese map shows that Muar had a second Portuguese fort besides Malacca. From the map, it was named Fortaleza de Muar, built in a triangular layout to defend the colony against attacks from the Dutch and Aceh, at the mouth of the Bentayan River near the Muar River. The fort has since ceased to exist but it is believed to be located at the present location of Bentayan Express Bus Station in Jalan Maharani, downtown Muar.
- Several cartographic records such as maps by Abraham Ortelius (1584) and Jan Huyghen van Linschoten (1595) depicts Muar as a city situated south of Malacca.

=== Sultan Ali's rule and cession to Johor ===
A civil war broke off between Tengku Ali, the issue of Sultan Hussein Shah, and Dato' Temenggong Daeng Ibrahim, which was later settled by a treaty of agreement signed in Singapore between the British and Tengku Ali. Consequently, Tengku Ali formally cedes the rest of Johor but Muar to Temenggong Daeng Ibrahim in returns of the "Sultan" title, with the condition that the title is not hereditary. Tengku Ali was invested as the Sultan of Muar, with an annual pension from the British Government under the terms of the treaty. The sovereign state of Muar, also known as Kesang, covers an area between the Muar and Kesang rivers.

Although Sultan Ali was in fact the real heir of the Johor Sultanate through the Bendahara lineage, but due to his weakness, the Temenggong was named the de facto ruler instead, founding the current ruling House of Temenggong. Sultan Ali delegated the administrative affairs of Muar to the Raja Temenggung of Muar (also known by the title of Temenggong Paduka Tuan of Muar) and rather spent most of his time in Malacca.

Muar was sparsely populated in 1855 with a population of 800 people, and no formal structure of government was formed. In 1860, Sultan Ali reportedly borrowed $53,600 from a Chettiar money lender, Kavana Chana Shellapah and signed an agreement with him to contribute a portion of his monthly allowance to repay his debt. However, Sultan Ali found himself unable to pay settle his debts in time, and a frustrated Shellapah wrote to the British government in 1866. Pressured to liquidate his debts in time, Sultan Ali granted Shellapah the right to trade off Muar to the Raja Temenggung as mortgage if he is unable to do so. His relations with Temenggong Daeng Ibrahim remained strained; in 1860, Sultan Ali allowed a Bugis adventurer, Suliwatang, and the Negri chiefs of Rembau and Sungei Ujong to settle in Muar and prepare themselves for an attack on Johor. Such bad blood between the Sultan Ali and Temenggong Daeng Ibrahim passed down to the Temenggong's son, Abu Bakar, who succeeded his father after the former died in 1862. Shortly after Abu Bakar became the Temenggong of Johor, he sent a letter to Sultan Ali to reassert of Johor's sovereignty over Segamat. Continued disputes over the sovereignty of Segamat has culminated into an outbreak of a war between the Temenggong's faction with the Sultan's. Eleven years later in 1873, attempts made by Suliwatang to collect custom taxes from inhabitants at the Muar estuary further soured the relationship with Temenggong Abu Bakar's men. Temenggong Abu Bakar became the Maharaja of Johor in 1868, and eventually Sultan in 1885.

Upon Sultan Ali's death in Umbai, Malacca in 1877, his 11-year-old youngest son, Tengku Mahmood, was named his successor, fuelling anger and dissatisfaction of his eldest son, Tengku Alam Shah. The Raja Temenggung of Muar and the village chieftains voted in favour of a merger of Muar with Johor following the succession dispute between the two of Sultan Ali's issues. Tengku Alam Shah, who questioned the legitimacy of the chieftains' wishes and staked his hereditary claims over Muar, went on to instigate the 1879 Jementah Civil War in a bid to reclaim Muar, but was easily vanquished by Maharaja Abu Bakar's forces. Muar was finally annexed as part of the modern state of Johor on 30 December 1879.

During the 1880s, the sovereign rulers of Johor, Temenggong Ibrahim and his successor, Sultan Abu Bakar introduced the Kangchu system and actively encouraged the Chinese leaders to set up new gambier and black pepper plantations, as well as to bring in Chinese immigrants as agricultural settlers and labourers to open and work in these plantations in Muar. Western-style contracts (termed as Surat Sungai in Malay, literally "River Documents") were distributed and signed by the Kapitan Cina (Chinese leaders) who have established the plantations along river banks in Johor. Letters of authority (Surat Kuasa) were issued when the first Chinese leaders began settling in Johor during the 1850s. The Temenggong quickly established goodwill relations with the Kapitan Cina by appointing one Malay administrator, Dato' Bentara Luar Muhamad Salleh bin Perang, who was able to speak Teochew, the language spoken by most Kapitan Cina and settlers and able to read Chinese for these purposes. Influx of these settlers are mainly of Teochew origin, and were generally first – or second – generation ethnic Chinese who became an integral part of Muar until today, helping shaped the population demographic and the social economy of Muar. There is even a town called Bukit Gambir (lit. 'hill of gambier'), which is now in Tangkak District since seceded from Muar (district) in 2008.

The modern township of Muar, the primary urban centre of the Muar District, was founded by the Dato' Bentara Luar in 1885. It was officially inaugurated on 12 August 1887 by Maharaja Abu Bakar, who bestowed the sobriquet Bandar Maharani ("Town of the Empress") in honour of his consort, Maharani Fatimah. The Maharani attended the official opening ceremony at Tangga Batu — a site near the present-day Hentian Maharani bus station — where an auspicious amulet (azimat) was reportedly interred. Nearly a century later, in 1984, Muar commemorated its centenary with a grand celebration attended by Sultan Iskandar.

The prosperity and rapid development of Muar have made it as one of the earliest towns in British Malaya ever to have its own local railway service in the early days. The Muar State Railway (MSR) operated from 1889 to 1925, linking Jalan Sulaiman in downtown Muar and Sungai Pulai, spanning a distance of 22.5 kilometres (14.0 mi). A 1916 plan to extend the line to Batu Pahat was scrapped, and the service was entirely terminated in 1925 due to financial and geographical constraints and its diminished importance following the construction of Jalan Abdul Rahman (now part of Federal Route 5), which links Muar and Parit Jawa. An MSR steam locomotive is now on display at the Tanjung Emas Park.

=== World War II ===
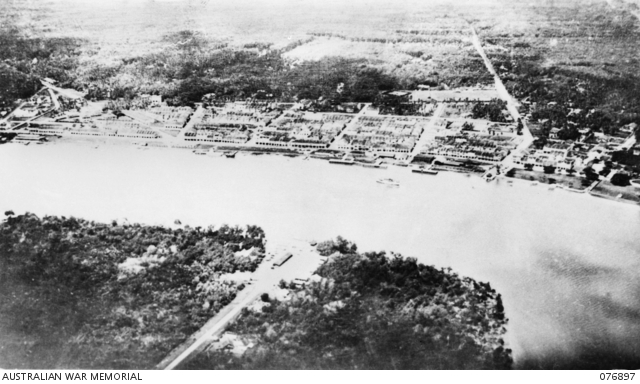
The Muar Ferry Crossing, in the Battle of Muar, where the 45th Indian Brigade was disposed along 24 miles of river front with four companies of infantry north of the river and the remainder positioned south of the river, to cover the main coast road at Muar against the advance of the Imperial Guards Division.

During World War II, the Battle of Muar occurred around the area spanning from Gemencheh in Negeri Sembilan, the Muar River and Bukit Bakri in Muar District, Johor, was the last major battle of the Malayan campaign, fought between the British Allied forces and Japanese forces from 8 December 1941 – 31 January 1942 in British Malaya. The Battle of Bakri, also known as the Siege of Bakri, was a tumultuous battle of the fighting troops in Bukit Bakri on 17 January 1942, resulting in the near-annihilation of the Allies' deployed 45th Indian Infantry Brigade, with heavy casualties for its two attached Australian's 2/19th and 2/29th Infantry Battalions and the eventual fall of Muar to Imperial Japanese hands. During the 1942–45 Japanese occupation of Malaya, Muar continued to serve as an important administrative centre under the occupying Japanese army with many locals involved in the bulk of anti-Japanese resistance groups such as the Malayan People's Anti-Japanese Army (MPAJA) and Force 136.

=== Emergency era ===
At the height of the Malayan Emergency period, the police station of Bukit Kepong was ambushed and brutally attacked by members of the Malayan National Liberation Army (MNLA), the paramilitary arm of the Malayan Communist Party, on 23 February 1950, killing 26 policemen, their family members and several other people from nearby villages.

In Muar, indigenous resistance to British occupation and communist insurgencies was heavily underscored by ethno-religious leadership. This dynamic is illustrated by Panglima Kiyai Salleh, a martial arts teacher and religious leader of Javanese and Banjarese lineage, who founded the Tentera Selempang Merah ("Red Sash Army") insurgent group.

=== Modern history ===
The Orang Tujuh ("Group of Seven") of Muar, consisting of Tun Dr. Awang Hassan, Dato' Abdul Rahman Mohamed Yassin, his son Dato' Suleiman Abdul Rahman, Tan Sri Dato' Hassan Yunus and Dato' Haji Kosai Mohd. Salleh, was said to be active in opposing the formation of Malayan Union and advocating the independence of Malaya.

Muar was declared a municipality in 2001 with the declaration of Muar Municipal Council.

== Geography ==
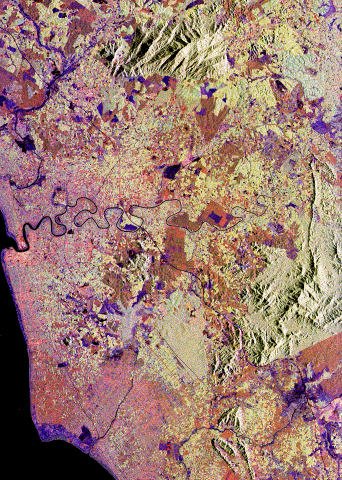
NASA's Spaceborne radar image (SAR) shows the city of Muar is at the center of the left edge of the image at the mouth of the Muar River (Sungai Muar). More information The city is about 150 km (93 mi) southeast of Malaysia's capital Kuala Lumpur. The coast at the left side of the image is on the Strait of Malacca, the narrow waterway separating Malaysia and the Indonesian island of Sumatra. Blue areas along the coast are tidal marshes. The fine patchwork patterns seen across the image in yellow and orange are groves of rubber, banana and oil palm trees, the dominant agricultural products of the region. Fields of other seasonal crops appear in darker shades of orange and purple. A sharp boundary is seen in the lower right between native forest in light green and clear-cut croplands in orange. The grey area at the north is Mount Ledang.

Bandar Maharani in Muar District

The town of Muar is located at the mouth of the Muar River. Muar's flat terrain has enabled the extensive use of bicycles and tricycles as the main and major mode of transportation in the town's early days. This was believed to be the main factor why Muar was once the town with the most bicycles and the only one that requires valid license issued by the town council to own and use a bicycle in the country.

Prior to the 2008 separation, the Muar District formerly covers 2,346.12 km^{2}, with a population of 328,695 (2000).

=== Climate ===
Muar, like the rest of Peninsular Malaysia, enjoys a year-round equatorial climate which is warm and sunny, along with plentiful rainfall, especially during the southwest monsoon from April to September. The climate is very much dictated by the adjacent sea and the wind system. In the 2006/2007 floods, unusually heavy rainfall in the states of Johor and Malacca has resulted in the worst flooding in southern Peninsular Malaysia in recorded history. Muar was not spared from this dreadful disaster which lasted almost a month. Many areas of Muar such as Bukit Bakri, Pagoh and Lenga were seriously inundated with some areas up to 10 feet (3.0 m). About 22,933 people were evacuated to relief centre.s

Climate data for Muar
| Month | Jan | Feb | Mar | Apr | May | Jun | Jul | Aug | Sep | Oct | Nov | Dec | Year |
|---|---|---|---|---|---|---|---|---|---|---|---|---|---|
| Mean daily maximum °C (°F) | 32.1 (89.8) | 32.5 (90.5) | 32.6 (90.7) | 32.7 (90.9) | 32.7 (90.9) | 32.4 (90.3) | 32.2 (90.0) | 32.2 (90.0) | 32.2 (90.0) | 32.2 (90.0) | 31.5 (88.7) | 32.2 (90.0) | 32.3 (90.1) |
| Daily mean °C (°F) | 26.8 (80.2) | 27.1 (80.8) | 27.1 (80.8) | 27.3 (81.1) | 27.2 (81.0) | 26.9 (80.4) | 26.8 (80.2) | 26.8 (80.2) | 26.8 (80.2) | 26.9 (80.4) | 26.6 (79.9) | 26.8 (80.2) | 26.9 (80.5) |
| Mean daily minimum °C (°F) | 21.5 (70.7) | 21.7 (71.1) | 21.7 (71.1) | 21.9 (71.4) | 21.7 (71.1) | 21.5 (70.7) | 21.4 (70.5) | 21.5 (70.7) | 21.5 (70.7) | 21.7 (71.1) | 21.7 (71.1) | 21.4 (70.5) | 21.6 (70.9) |
| Average precipitation mm (inches) | 140 (5.5) | 112 (4.4) | 174 (6.9) | 217 (8.5) | 205 (8.1) | 219 (8.6) | 216 (8.5) | 226 (8.9) | 201 (7.9) | 238 (9.4) | 224 (8.8) | 166 (6.5) | 2,338 (92) |
Source: Climate-Data.org

== Demographics ==
In year 2010, the estimated population of Muar district was 239,027 people. The majority of the Muar's population is of 55.9% Bumiputera (55.3% Malays), 35.7% Chinese descent, 2.4% Indian and others 0.2%.

The city's age distribution (as of 2010):

- 26.6% under 15
- 65.2% from 15 to 64
- 8.2% 65 or older

== Administration ==
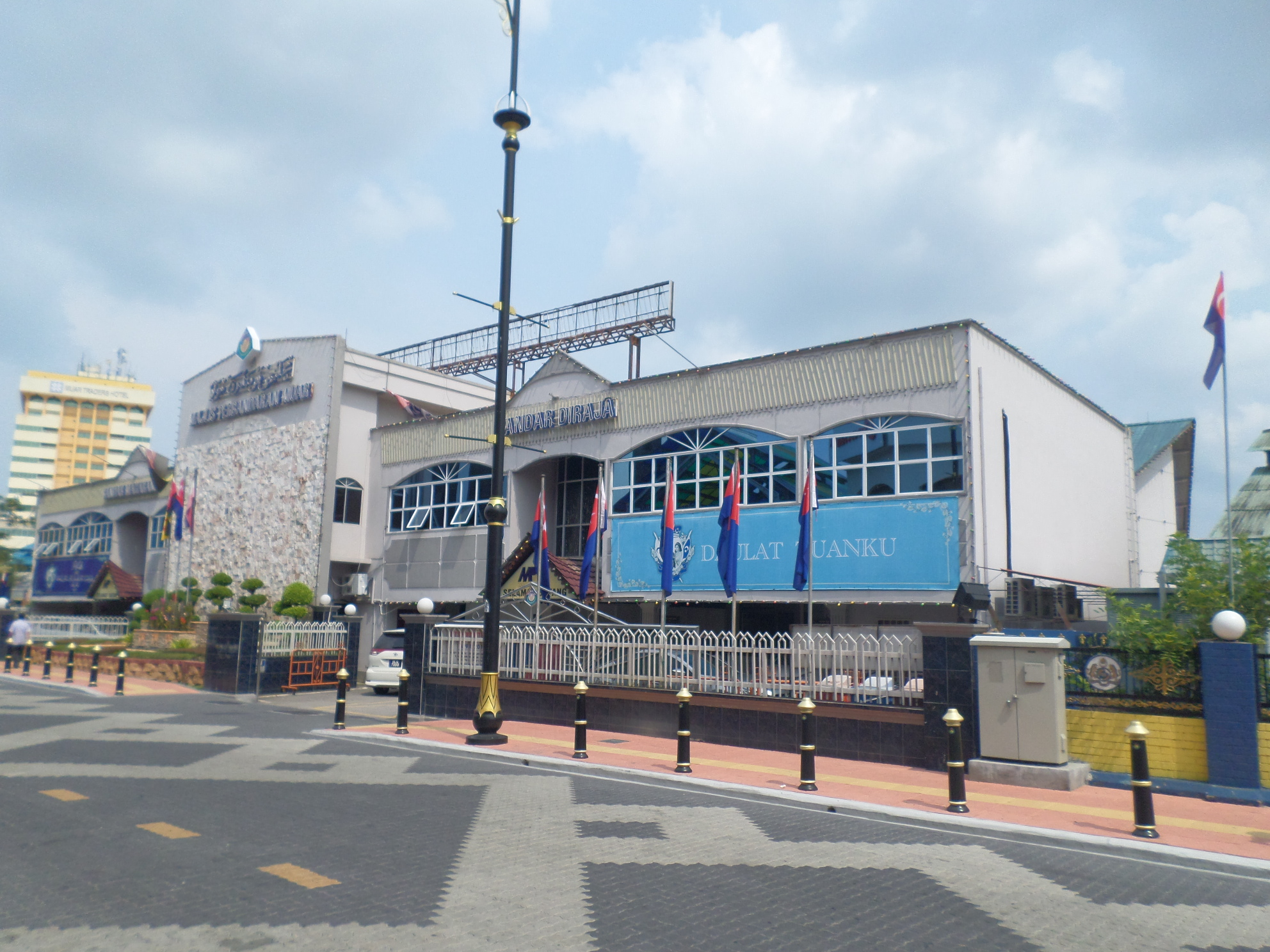
Muar Municipal Council

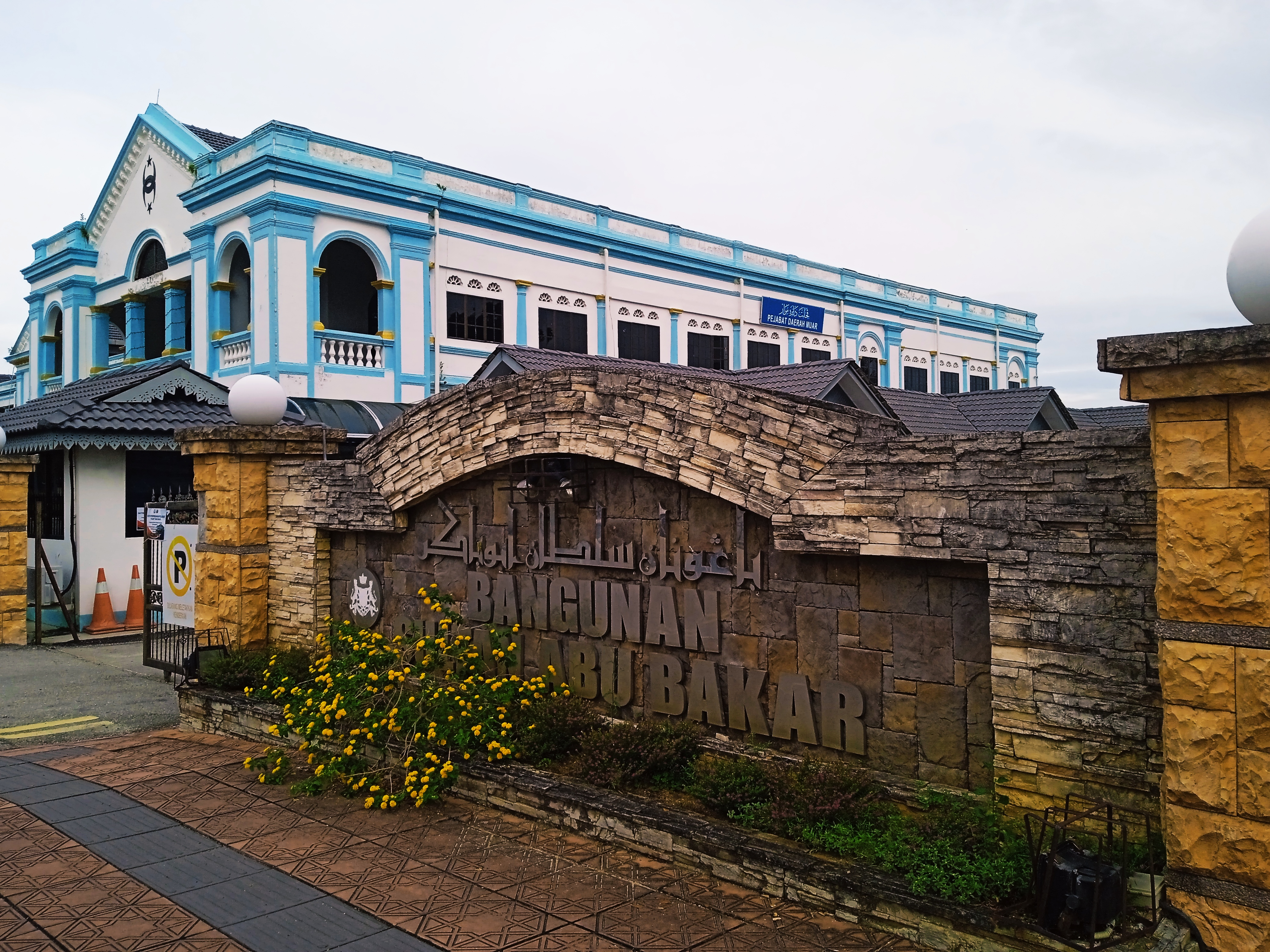
Muar District Office

The Muar District was formerly divided administratively into Muar (Bandar Maharani) municipality and Tangkak township. Upon the upgrading of Tangkak sub-district into a full-fledged district, Bandar Maharani of Muar is now administered by the Muar Municipal Council (formerly South Muar Town Council, later Muar Town Council) under the Muar District Office, while Tangkak is administered by the Tangkak District Council (formerly North Muar Town Council).

The proposed Maharani Sentral, a new administrative hub integrated with a bus terminal and market, is currently being planned to be built at the location near the Muar Bypass in between Jalan Haji Kosai and Jalan Temenggung.

== Transportation ==
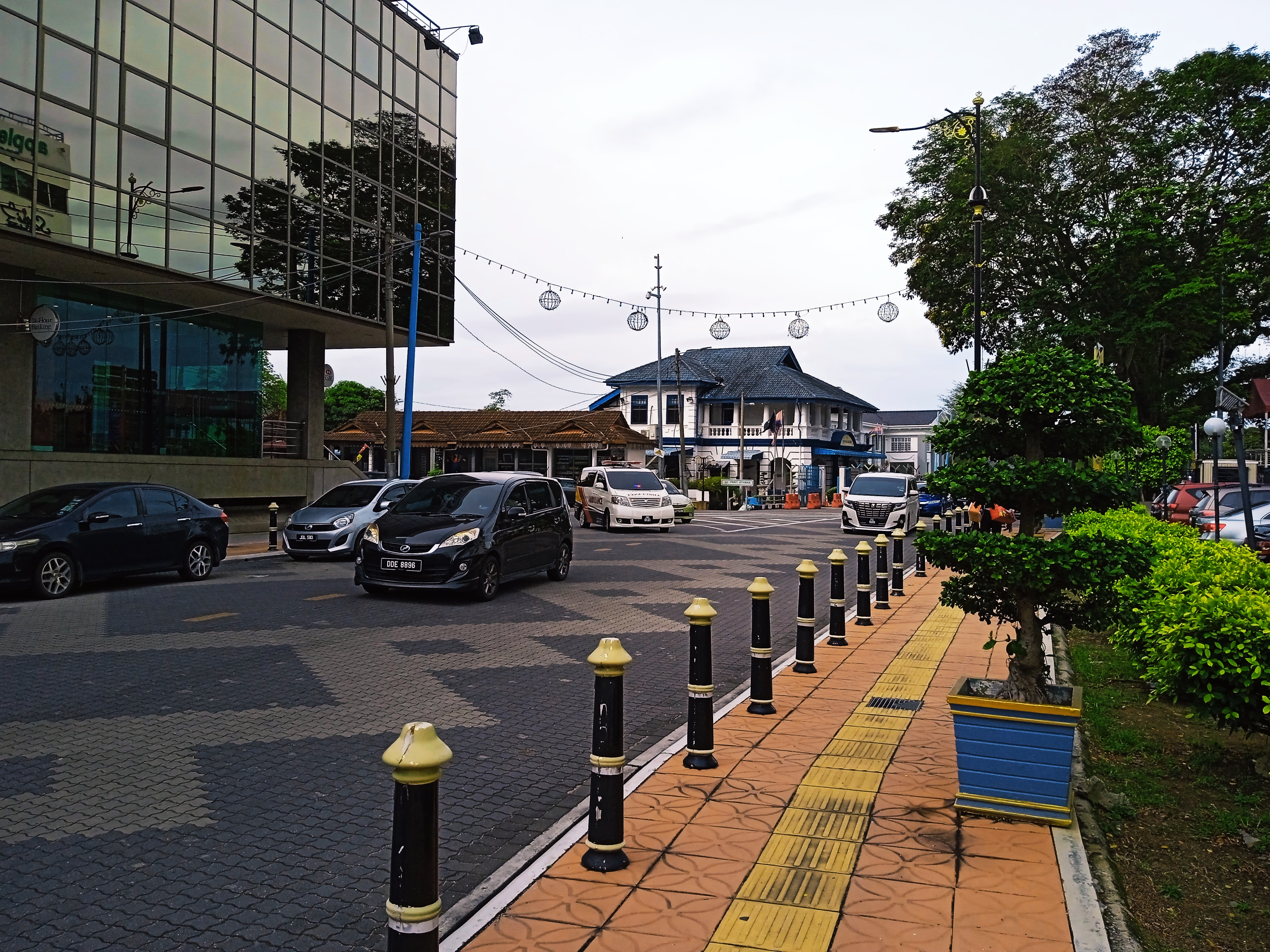
Jalan Petrie in Muar Town.

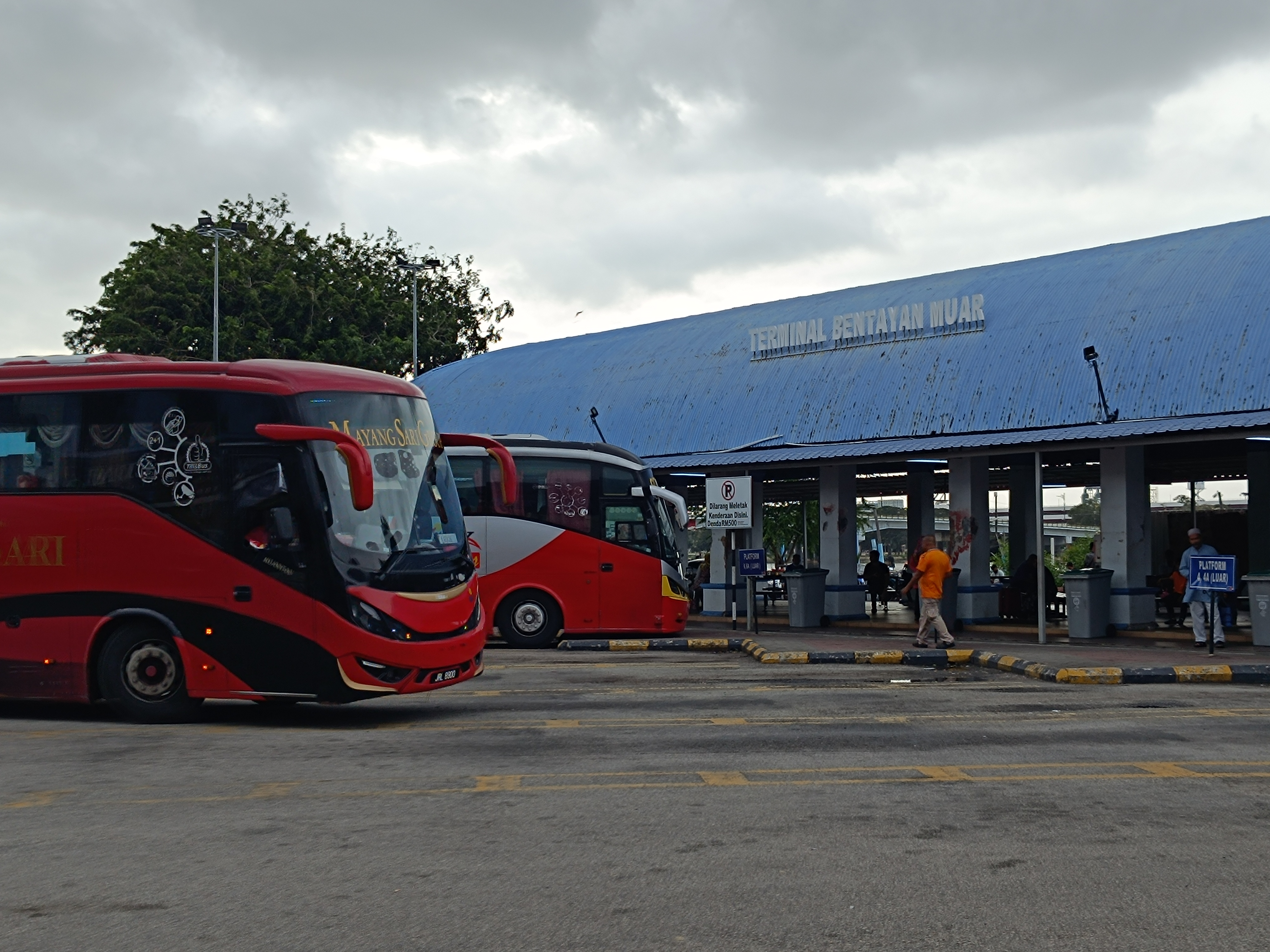
Terminal Bentayan Muar

=== By road ===
Besides federal roads such as Federal Route 5 that runs through Muar town centre, Muar is also accessible via the PLUS Expressway through the Tangkak (EXIT 235), Bukit Gambir (EXIT 236), Pagoh (EXIT 238) and Yong Peng (EXIT 241) interchange exits.

Access to Segamat, the closest railway station to Muar, is possible using Federal Route 23.

Sultan Ismail Bridge, the first bridge across the Muar River, was built in 1960 and completed in 1962 to replace old ferry services between downtown Muar and Tanjung Agas on the Tangkak side. The new cable-stayed Muar Second Bridge connecting Parit Bunga at the north and Sabak Awor at the south across the river is part of the 13 km Muar Bypass (Federal Route 224) that was completed in 2005, becoming the latest landmark of the town. The highway traverses through the outskirts of the town, easing the journey by diverting the traffic from downtown Muar.

There are also express bus coaches to all the nearby towns and the major cities of Malaysia including Kuala Lumpur, Johor Bahru, Malacca City, Seremban, Kuantan, Ipoh, George Town etc., and also to Singapore and Hat Yai. There are two bus stations in Muar, namely Hentian Maharani Bus Station and Bentayan Express Bus Station (formerly Pagoh Bus Station).

==== Routes ====
| Code | Route | Operator |
|---|---|---|
| MSBP002 | Muar - Batu Pahat via Semerah | Mayang Sari |
| 65 | Muar - Segamat via Tangkak | Northwest |

=== By rail ===
The state railway service, KTMB, does not serve Muar or its environs; instead the closest station is in Segamat. Train services to the state capital Johor Bahru as well as northbound services to Kuala Lumpur, Ipoh, Seremban or Tumpat are also available.

=== By sea ===
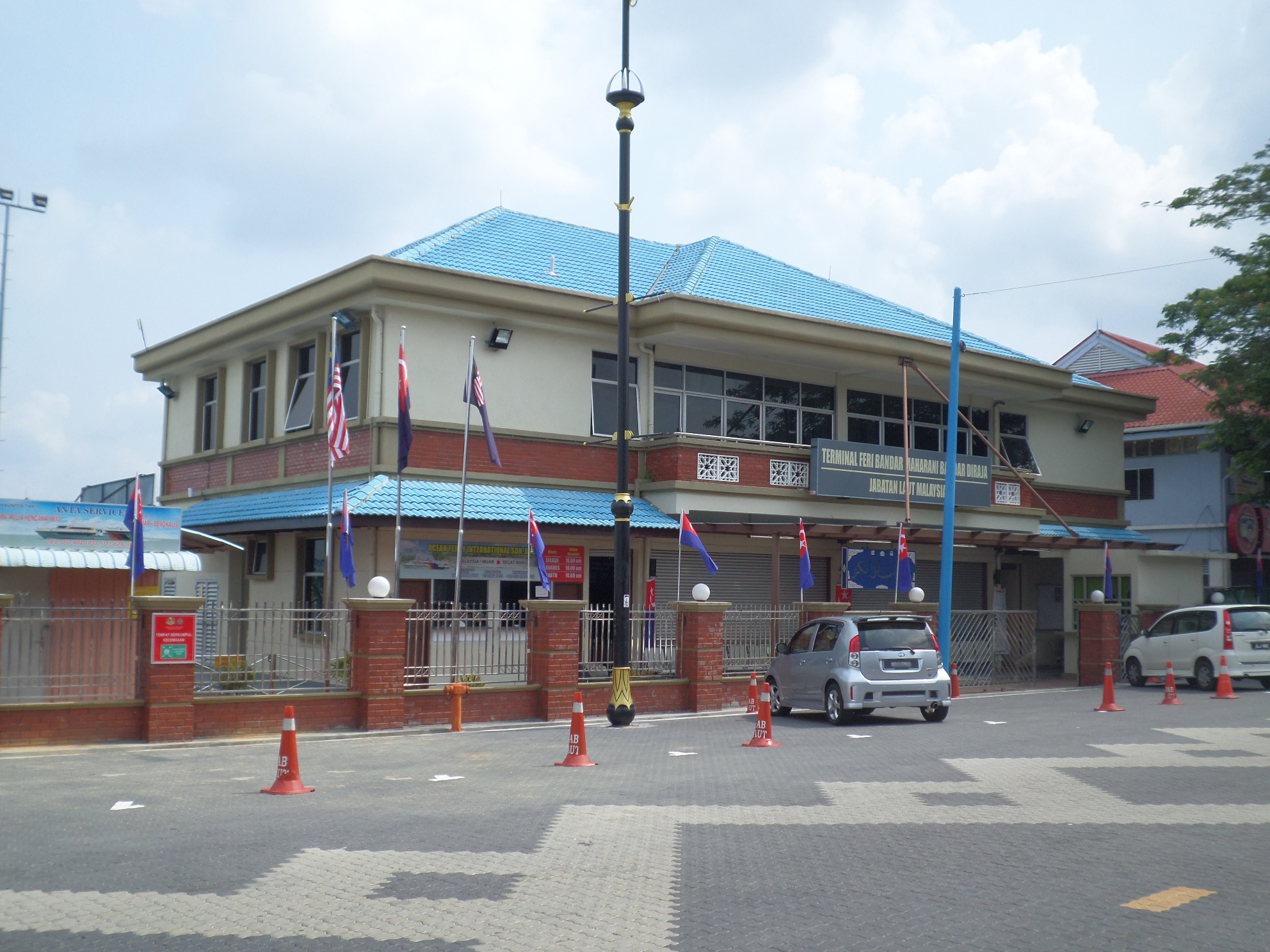
Bandar Maharani Ferry Terminal

Ferry services to Dumai, Indonesia, is also available on a regular basis, departing from the Custom Jetty. Muar is the only district (besides the state capital Johor Bahru) in Johor that has its own Custom and Excise Duty Department office and checkpoint at its own jetty.

=== By air ===
The nearest airport is arguably the Batu Berendam airport (IATA: MKZ, ICAO: WMKM) in Malacca. The Senai Airport (IATA: JHB) is located further south, being closer to Johor Bahru than Muar.

== Economy ==
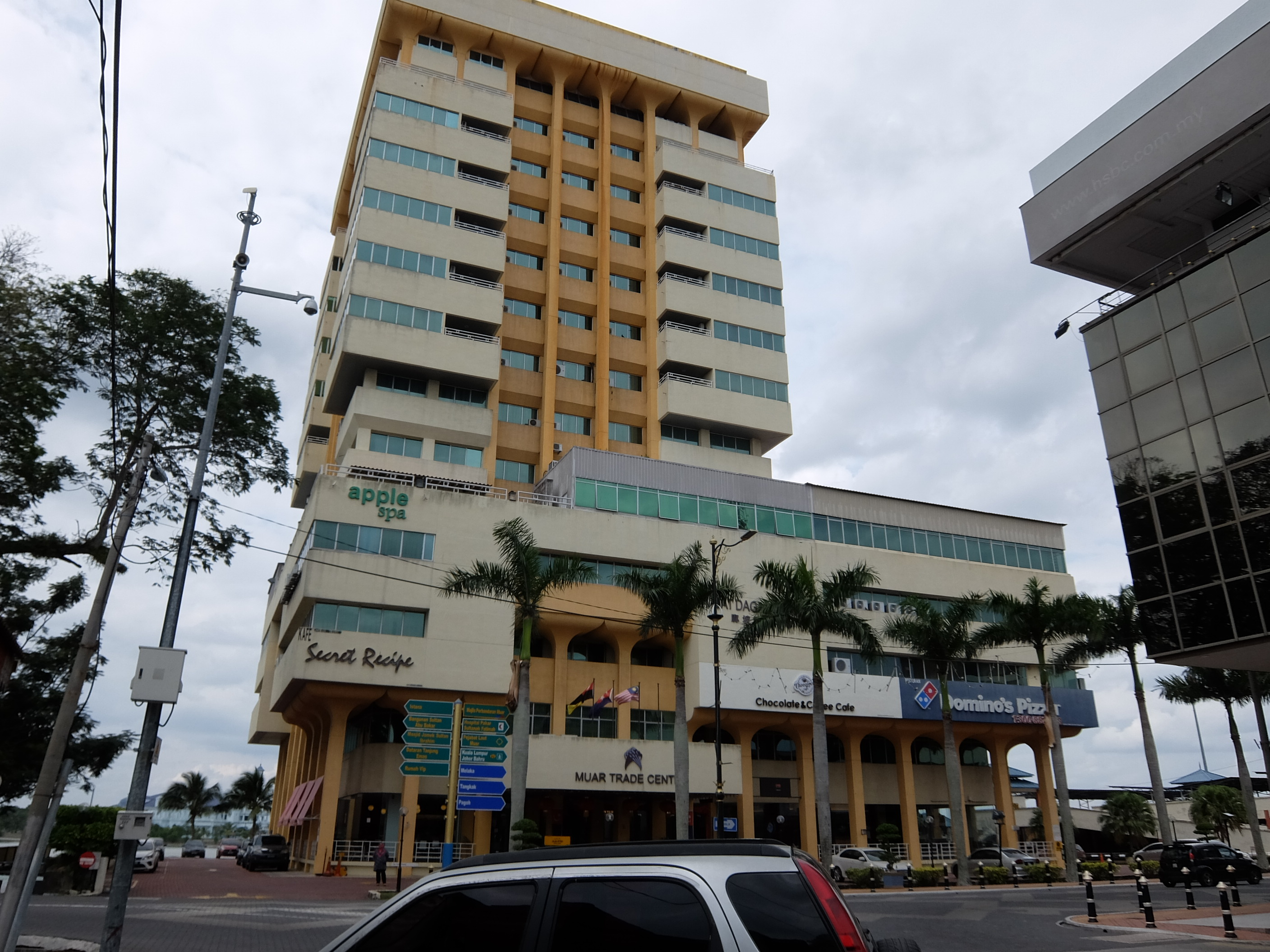
Muar Trade Centre

Muar is well known as the hub of the furniture industry of Malaysia.

The industrial sector of Muar is mostly concentrated at Bukit Bakri, Jorak, Parit Bakar and Pagoh within the eponymous district, as well as in Tanjung Agas in Tangkak District across the Muar River. Tanjung Agas itself is home to plants of multinational companies, namely STMicroelectronics, Micron Technology and Pioneer Corporation.

Muar's agricultural sector is mainly made up of the major crops of rubber and oil palm, in addition of some pockets of coconut, cocoa, fruits (i.e. durian, rambutan, langsat, mangosteen, banana, papaya, pineapple, dragon fruit etc.), vegetables and livestock, poultry and fish farming. Fishing is the major economy in villages like Parit Jawa, Parit Raja, Parit Tiram, and Kesang.

== Education ==
=== National primary schools ===
- SK Bakri Batu 5, Bakri
- SK St. Andrew
- SK Ismail 1
- SK Ismail 2
- SK Convent Infant Jesus
- SK Abdullah
- SK Simpang Lima
- SK Parit Bunga
- SK Seri Jong
- SK Simpang 4
- SK Simpang Jeram
- SK Temiang
- SK Parit Setongkat
- SK Air Hitam Batu 18

=== Tamil primary schools ===
- SJK(T) Jalan Khalidi

=== Chinese primary schools ===
- SJK(C) Soon Cheng
- SJK(C) Chung Hwa 1A
- SJK(C) Chung Hwa 1B
- SJK(C) Chung Hwa 2A
- SJK(C) Chung Hwa 2B
- SJK(C) Chung Hwa 3
- SJK(C) Chung Hwa Presbyterian
- SJK(C) Sing Hwa
- SJK(C) Chian Kuo
- SJK(C) Hwa Ming
- SJK(C) Pu Nan
- SJK(C) Pei Yang
- SJK(C) Yu Jern
- SJK(C) San Chai
- SJK(C) Sin Ming
- SJK(C) Aik Ming
- SJK(C) Yu Eng
- SJK(C) Pengkalan Bukit

=== Secondary schools ===
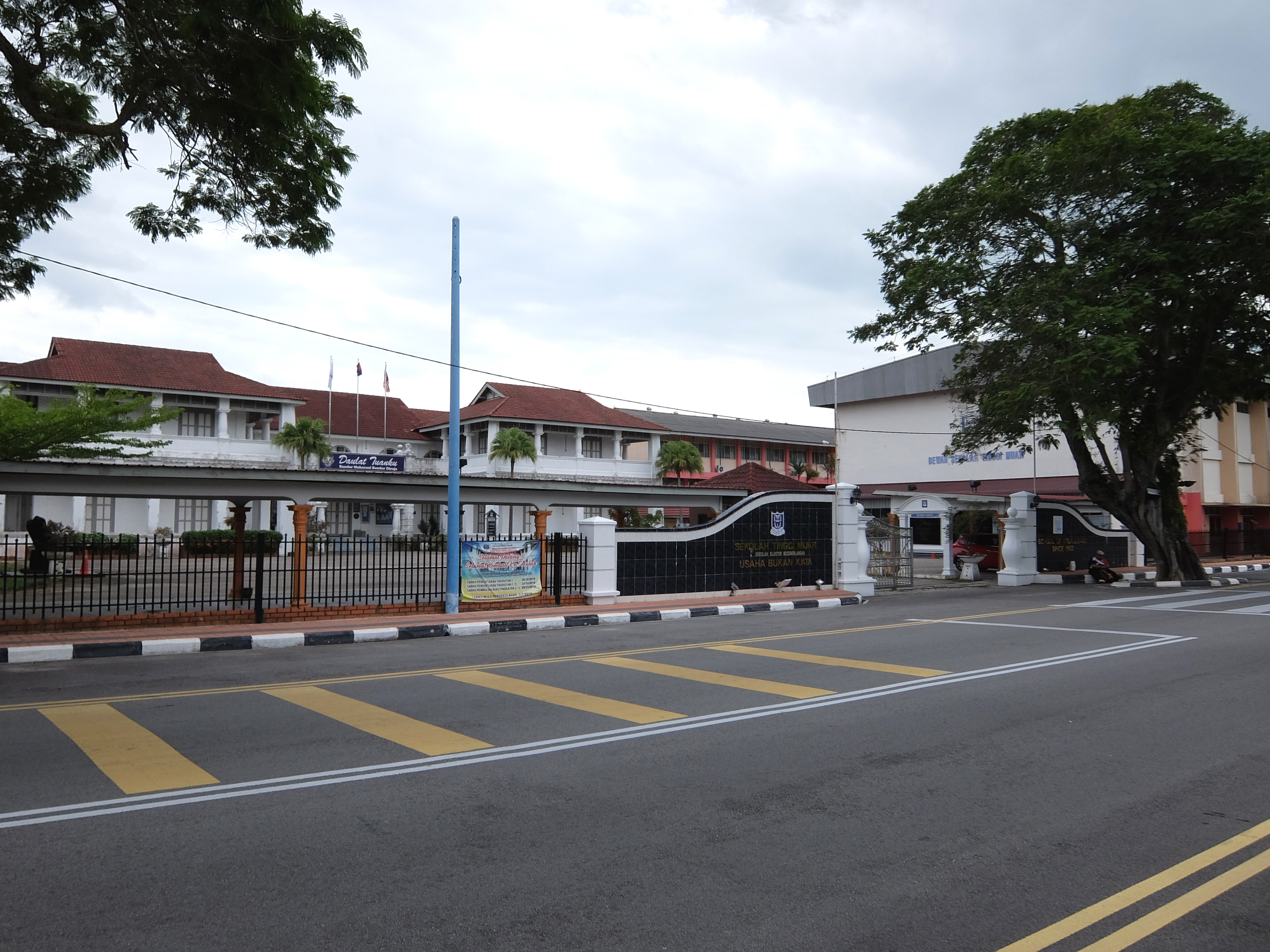
Muar High School

- Sekolah Tinggi Muar
- SMK Sultan Alauddin Riayat Shah 1, Pagoh
- SMK Saint Andrew
- SMK Convent
- Sultan Abu Bakar Girl's School
- SMK Dato' Sri Amar Diraja
- SM Sains Muar
- Maktab Rendah Sains MARA (MRSM Muar)
- SM Teknik Muar (formerly known as Sekolah Menengah Vokasional Muar)
- SMK Jalan Junid
- SMK Sri Muar
- SMK Bandar Maharani
- SMK (A) Ma'ahad Muar
- SMK (Felcra) Bukit Kepong
- SMK Tengku Mahkota
- SMK Raja Muda
- SMK Tun Perak
- SMK Tun Mamat
- SMJK Pei Hwa
- SMK Bukit Pasir
- SMK Lenga
- SMK Parit Bunga
- SMK Tun Dr. Ismail (STUDI)
- SMK Seri Menanti
- SMK Sungai Abong
- SMK Bukit Naning
- Chung Hwa High School, Jalan Junid

=== EduHub Pagoh (Bandar Universiti Pagoh) ===
The Pagoh University Town (Malay: Bandar Universiti Pagoh), also known as the Pagoh Educational Hub (EduHub Pagoh), is the largest master-planned higher education hub in Malaysia. The first phase was launched in the middle of September 2011. It hosts the following campuses:

- Universiti Tun Hussein Onn Malaysia (UTHM, branch campus)
- International Islamic University Malaysia (UIAM, branch campus)
- Universiti Teknologi Malaysia (UTM, branch campus)
- Politeknik Tun Syed Nasir

== Architecture ==
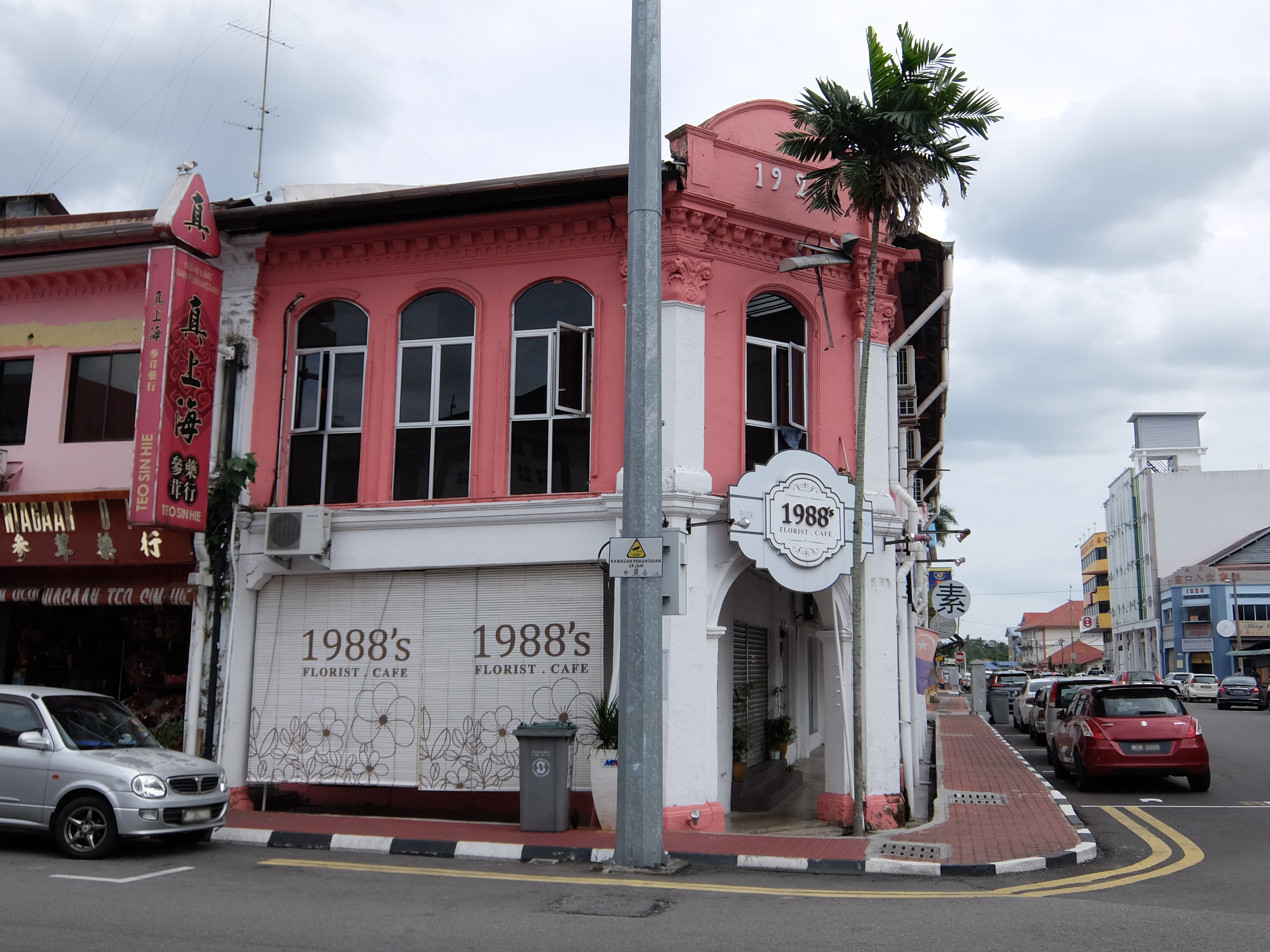
Old building in the town turned into a café dated back to 1926.

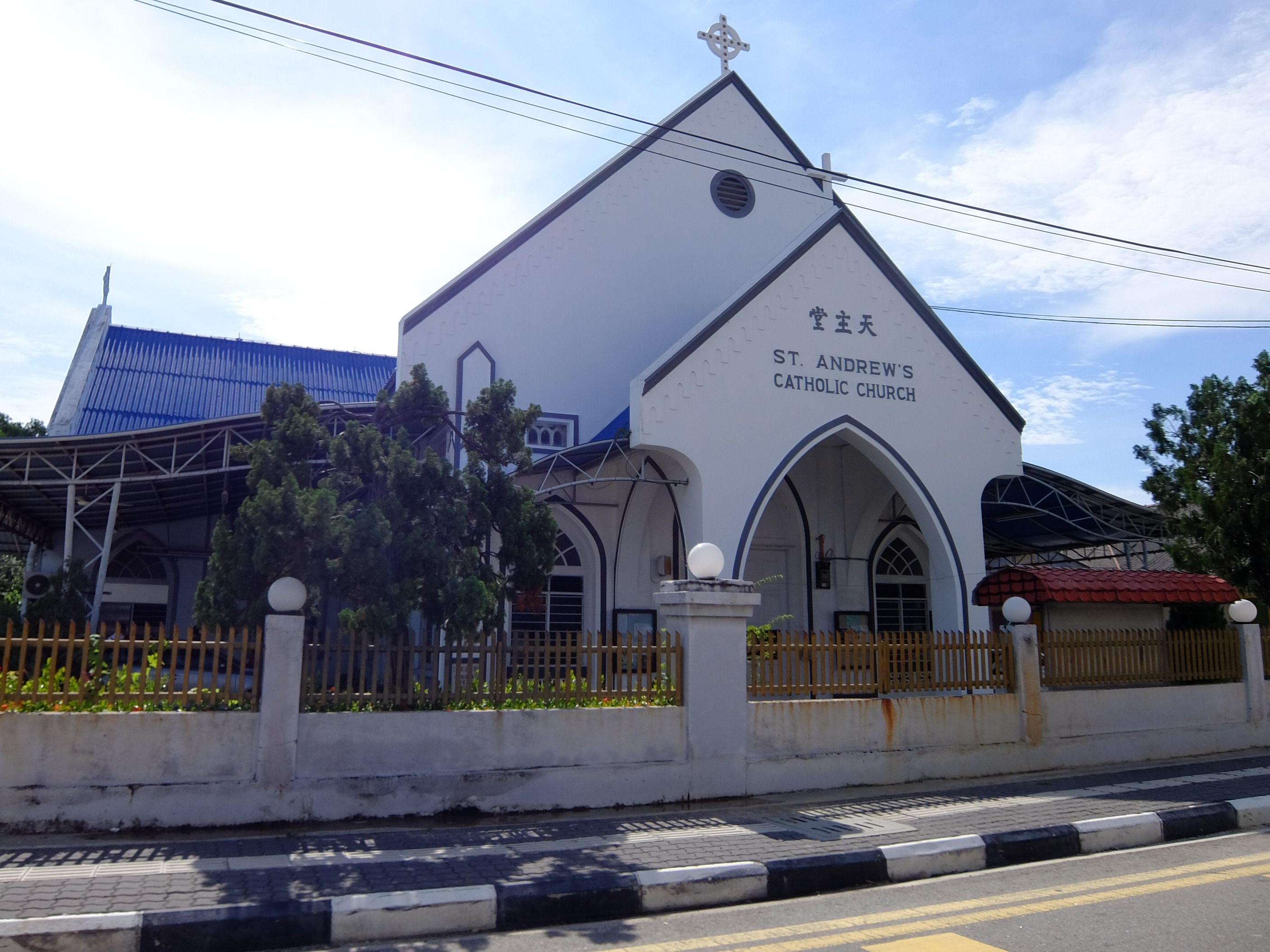
Saint Andrew's Catholic Church, established in December 1909.

In the town centre, rows of well-preserved pre-war commercial buildings still dominate the town's architecture.

Further up the town along the river where the main government administrative area located at the Jalan Petrie, Jalan Othman, Jalan Junid and Tanjung Emas area. The Sultan Ibrahim Jamek Mosque, the Sultan Abu Bakar Building, the former High Court Building, the Police Traffic Department building, the Muar High School building, the former Telecom building, the Jabatan Kerja Raya (JKR) building, the 2nd Battalion Regiment 501 AW's territorial army camp building, the Custom Department building and the official District Officer residence and others government official residence houses are among the many old, heritage and historic buildings still standing in the area.

Muar being the royal city of Johor have an official royal palace with a helipad situated at the Muar river bank at Jalan Petrie near Tanjung Emas.

== Tourism ==
There are many local attractions and places of interest in Muar, as the following:

=== Historical places ===
- Bukit Kepong Police Station – This police station at Bukit Kepong with a history museum is known for the brutal siege by communist terrorists on 23 February 1950 during the Malayan Emergency.
- Kubu Bentayan – The final fortress of the retreating Sultan Mahmud Shah of the Malacca Sultanate before being subdued by the Portuguese in the 15th century, situated at mouth of the Bentayan River. Today, the Bentayan Express Bus Station sits at the very site where the fortress used to stand. Another fortress but built by the Portuguese later, Fortaleza de Muar, was also believed to be situated at the same area.
- Panglima Lidah Hitam Mausoleum – The resting place of a legendary warrior Panglima Lidah Hitam, also known as Baginda Zahiruddin, from Padang Pariaman, Minangkabau, Sumatra. He was the founder of the martial art, Silat Lintau. Located at Parit Sakai, south of downtown Muar.
- Sultan Alauddin Riayat Shah I Mausoleum – Situated at Kampung Raja near Pagoh, it is the tomb of Sultan Alauddin Riayat Shah I, the seventh Sultan of Malacca from 1477 to 1488.
- Kota Buruk – Located at Tanjung Selabu, Jorak, it is where the founder of the Malacca Sultanate, Parameswara, stayed for more than ten years since exiled from Temasik before proceeding to open Malacca. It is said that another historic fort, Biawak Busuk, also opened by Parameswara, is also located just nearby.

=== Attractions ===
- Tanjung Emas - A recreational park beside the Muar River. serving as the main departure point for the Muar River Cruise.
- Mural art
- Bangsa Johor Mural
- Loving Sisters
- Ferry Pier
- Opera

== Culture and tradition ==
There are a few old historic legends which revolved around the area of Muar, namely Hikayat Malim Deman ("Epic of Malim Deman"), Lembing Awang Pulang Ke Dayang ("Awang's Spear Returns to Dayang") and Puteri Gunung Ledang ("The Princess of Mount Ledang").

Muar is widely hailed as the birthplace of Ghazal, one of Johor’s traditional musical heritages, as well as of several types of zapin dances like Zapin Lenga, Zapin Parit Bagan, Zapin Muar and Zapin Putar Alam, in addition to the Ceracap Inai dance. Keroncong is a popular musical genre among the Malays of Javanese descent in Muar.

The traditional Javanese Kuda Kepang and the Barongan dances, originating from Indonesia, is believed to be best performed by Muar's Javanese diaspora, especially the Sungai Balang, Parit Bugis, Parit Yusof, Lenga or Bukit Gambir troupes.

It is generally acknowledged that the local dialect of Malay spoken here (and throughout the state of Johor), the Johor-Riau dialect, is the prestige version of the Malay language adopted throughout the country.

Other than the above, Muar is well known for their Chinese community's Lion Dance. Muar's Kun Seng Keng Lion Dance association had been the national champion for 48 times and world champion for 44 times in the International Championship for Lion Dance since 1992 besides winning many other various championships.

The Ching Giap See Temple is the largest Buddhist temple in the state of Johor and it is located along Jalan Sulaiman in Muar. In addition, another Buddhist temple, Nan Hai Fei Lai, was established before 1913 and is considered as the oldest Buddhist temple in the town, located at Jalan Salleh.

Gurudwara Sahib Muar is a historical Sikh temple in the state of Johor and it is located along Jalan Mohamadiah, Taman Sri Tanjung, Muar, inaugurated on 3 February 1933.

== Hospitals ==
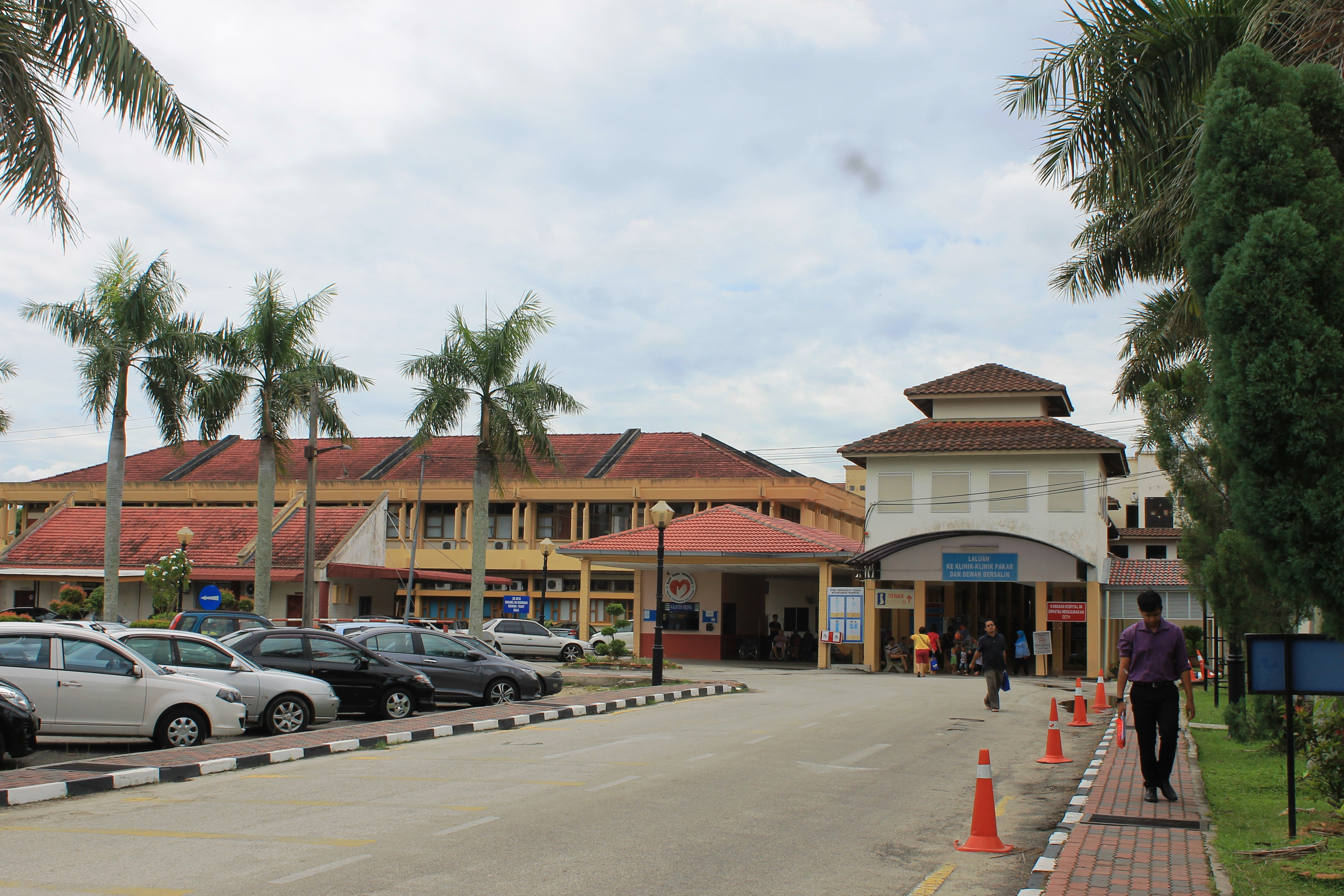
Main building of Sultanah Fatimah Specialist Hospital.

Muar is served by one government hospital as well as numerous primary health centres.

The Sultanah Fatimah Specialist Hospital (HPSF), formerly known as the Muar District Hospital, has been upgraded to specialist hospital status and renamed. Currently, the HPSF serves as a teaching hospital for Melaka Manipal Medical College and Asia Metropolitan University.

== Notable people ==
=== Politicians and public servants ===
- Syed Saddiq Syed Abdul Rahman, Member of Parliament Muar (2018-current).
- Muhyiddin Yassin, 13th Menteri Besar of Johor (1986–1995) and 8th Prime Minister of Malaysia (2020–2021).
- Mohamed Khaled Nordin, 15th Menteri Besar of Johor (2013–2018).
- Abdul Ghani Othman, 14th Menteri Besar of Johor (1995–2013).
- Othman Saat, 11th Menteri Besar of Johor (1967–1982).
- Hassan Yunus, 10th Menteri Besar of Johor (1959–1967).
- Abdul Rahman Mohamed Yassin, first President of the Dewan Negara (1959–1968).
- Suleiman Abdul Rahman, first Minister of the Interior (1957–1959) and former Malaysian High Commissioner to Australia (1961–1963).
- Chua Jui Meng, former Bakri's Member of Parliament, former Health Minister of Malaysia and former vice-president of MCA.
- Abdul Kadir Yusuf, former Minister of Law and the Judiciary, Lord President of the Supreme Court and Attorney General of Malaysia, his wife is Fatimah Hashim and their son, Ali Abdul Kadir is former Securities Commission chief.
- Fatimah Hashim, the first woman minister, former Women, Family and Community Development.
- Mohamed Noah Omar, former Minister of Home Affairs and first Speaker of the Dewan Rakyat. Father of Rahah Noah.
- Sulaiman Ninam Shah, former UMNO permanent chairman, former Johor state assemblyman for Parit Jawa (1959–1964).
- Anwar Abdul Malik, a close associate of Onn Jaafar, credited for giving United Malay National Organisation (UMNO) its name, initially United Malay Organisation.
- Awang Hassan, former Member of Parliament of Muar Selatan, former Penang State Governor, the father of Yahya Awang.
- Sellapan Ramanathan, or SR Nathan, President of Singapore, was born in Singapore but grew up in Muar and spent his childhood with his three older sisters and parents in Muar.
- Joshua Benjamin Jeyaretnam, or J. B. Jeyaretnam, a former Singaporean politician, studied in a French convent school in Muar together with his sister in his early life.
- Liu Thai Ker, CEO of Housing Development Board of Singapore and Urban Redevelopment Authority in Singapore.
- Sam Lim, Member of the Australian House of Representatives
- Bahar Munip, Secretary-General, African-Asian Rural Development Organisation AARDO (1997-2003)

=== Science and technology ===
- Yahya Awang, the cardiothoracic surgeon who performed the open heart by-pass surgery on Prime Minister Mahathir Mohamad in 1989; pioneered the establishment of The National Heart Institute of Malaysia in 1992; and performed the first heart transplant in Malaysia in 1998.
- Abu Bakar Suleiman, former Health Ministry Director-General.
- Lip-Bu Tan, Chief Executive Officer of Intel.
- Albiruni Ryan Abdul Razak, Medical Oncologist with special interest in cancer drug development and musculoskeletal cancers. Also provides advisory help for development of early phase cancer trials for Malaysia.

=== Arts and entertainment ===
- Yasmin Ahmad, director and filmmaker.
- Nurul Hana Che Mahazan, DJ of Era.fm/XFM radio station, television host and finalist of Akademi Fantasia AF1 reality show.
- Namewee, Malaysian Chinese hip hop recording artist, composer, filmmaker and actor.
- Liu Kang, artist

=== Sportspersons ===
- Nordin Jadi, former track runner athlete, represented in 200m and 400m track events in both Los Angeles 1984 and Seoul 1988 (as Flag Bearer too) Summer Olympics.
- Yap Kim Hock, former top badminton player, silver medalist in Atlanta 1996 Summer Olympics in men's double with Cheah Soon Kit.
- Malik Sulaiman, former yachtsman, silver medalist in Bangkok 1998 Asian Games Regatta in the Super Moth category, and Commander (Cdr) of Royal Malaysian Navy (RMN).
- Mazlan Hamzah, former track athlete, 1964 Olympian.
- Teo Ee Yi, former badminton player.

== Sister cities ==
- Klang, Selangor, Malaysia
- Teluk Intan, Perak, Malaysia
- Kulim, Kedah, Malaysia
