= Kangchu system =

Socio-economic system developed by Chinese agricultural settlers in Johor

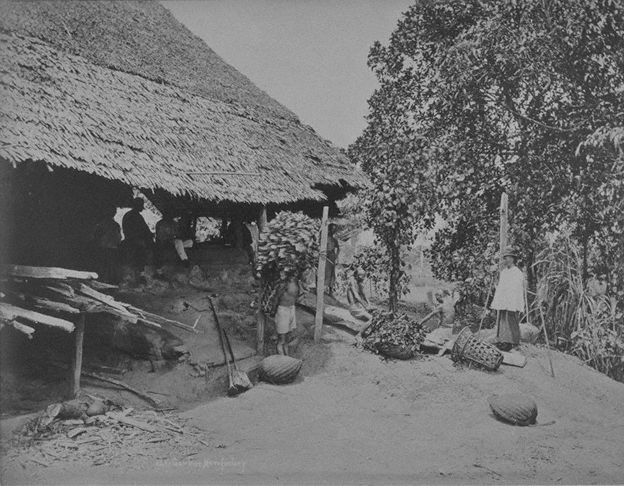
Chinese workers in a gambier and pepper plantation in Singapore, circa 1900.

The Kangchu system was a socio-economic system of organisation and administration developed by Chinese agricultural settlers in Johor (Note: "Johor" as a state or Sultanate had existed since the 14th century. This system was also practised in Singapore and Riau when the Johor Sultanate still ruled over them. The state of Johor later became part of the Federation of Malaya (later Malaysia) from 1957 onwards.) during the 19th century. The settlers organised themselves into informal associations (similar to the Kongsi organisations found in other Chinese communities), and chose a leader from among themselves.

In Chinese, "Kangchu" (Chinese: 港主; Hokkien Pe̍h-ōe-jī: Káng-chú; Teochew Pe̍h-ūe-jī: Káng-tsú) literally means 'master of the riverbank', and was the title given to the Chinese headmen of these river settlements. (Note: "Kangchu" is a Chinese term and is correctly used in this form in both singular and plural contexts. Some Western literary texts refer to "Kangchu" as "Kangchus" in its plural form.) The "Kangchu" leaders are also called "Kapitan".

The Kangchu system traces its origins from the 18th century when Chinese coolies settled in Penang and Riau and set up gambier and pepper plantations there. The sovereign rulers of Johor, Temenggong Daeng Ibrahim and his son and successor, Sultan Abu Bakar, took up the Kangchu system during the first half of the 19th century to provide a more organised form of administration as Chinese immigrants began to settle in the state in great numbers and developed the state's agricultural economy.

The term "Kangchu" became widely used during the 19th century, as Chinese immigrants began to settle in and around Johor state and set up gambier and pepper (Note: The gambier and pepper species planted in Singapore, Johor and the other Malay states were of the Uncaria Gambir and Piper Nigrum types respectively.) plantations. The social and economic welfare of the early Chinese settlers came under the charge of local Chinese leaders, who were responsible for running these agricultural plantations, which were situated along the river banks. In 1917, the British colonial government in Johor implemented an act which abolished the Kangchu system in the state, and the value for gambier declined during the early 20th century.

Variants of the Kangchu system thrived in other parts of Maritime Southeast Asia, where gambier and pepper were cultivated and where there were significant Chinese populations. The Kangchu and coolies who worked in the gambier and pepper plantations were mainly of Teochew origin, and were generally first- or second-generation Chinese immigrants.

== History ==
=== Early years ===
The origins of the Kangchu system dates back to the mid-18th century, when early Chinese settlers in Penang experimented in cash crop plantations with various types of crops, including pepper, gambier, betelnut and clove. The plantations were abandoned by the late 18th-century, as Penang experienced wars from Buginese seafarers that resulted in many gambier plantations being destroyed; contributing to the decline in plantations was the growing popularity of the spice trade that reaped much greater profits. At the beginning of the 19th century, these Chinese settlers began to look south to Malacca and Singapore, where gambier and pepper plantations had also been established.

In the late 1820s, Chinese settlers from Singapore also began to look towards Johor for gambier and pepper cultivation at the encouragement of Temenggong Abdul Rahman and his successor, Daeng Ibrahim. As more Chinese settlers established gambier and pepper plantations in Johor during the 1840s, Temenggong Daeng Ibrahim formed a bureaucracy made up of Malay officials to oversee administrative affairs upon the Kangchu. He began issuing official permits, known as Surat Sungai (transliterated as "river documents") in Malay, to the Kangchu (leaders of the settlers) which permitted them to establish these plantations along the river banks. In turn, the Kangchu were required to pay taxes from the profits generated by the gambier and pepper farms and the Surat Sungai, which had to be renewed after a specified period of time.

=== Mid to late-19th century ===
The first gambier and pepper plantations appeared in Southern Johor, notably Skudai. Lau Lib Keng, a Chinese settler based in Skudai, was the first person to receive a Surat Sungai, whereby the river banks of Skudai were leased to Lau for the cultivation of gambier and pepper. More Chinese settlers came to Johor from the 1850s onwards, and forested areas in Southern Johor such as Tebrau, Plentong and Stulang were cleared for the cultivation of gambier and pepper. By the time Temenggong Daeng Ibrahim's son, Abu Bakar took office from his father in 1862, at least 37 Surat Sungai have been issued to various Kangchu, all of whom were collectively responsible for the operations of the 1,200 gambier and pepper farms in the state. Most of these Chinese leaders were also members of secret societies, and communal warfare often broke out in Singapore between different dialect groups as a result of conflicting economic interests. From the late 1850s onwards, the Kangchu began to exert political influence in the state affairs by establishing close ties with Temenggong Abu Bakar. In 1865, Abu Bakar granted official recognition to the Teochew-dominated Johor branch of the Ngee Heng Kongsi after a Kangchu, Tan Kee Soon, raised a small army to subdue Sultan Ali's forces, from whom Abu Bakar was facing considerable dissent but was unable to raise an organised army. Abu Bakar nevertheless called for the Ngee Heng Kongsi to accept Chinese settlers of other dialect groups to prevent possible communal warfare as a result of conflicting economic interests.

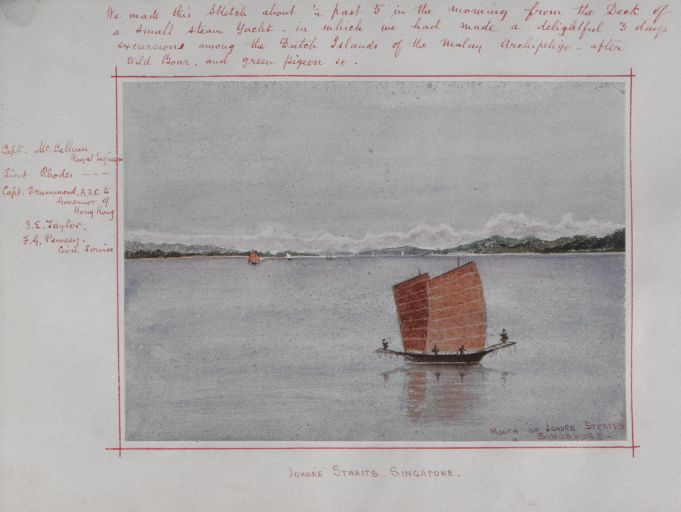
Chinese junks sailing in the Straits of Johor in 1879

The crop produce from these plantations were generally exported to other countries from Singapore with the assistance of Chinese merchants based in that city. From the 1860s onwards, many of these Kangchu chalked up debts and began to sell their property rights to these merchants or to larger business magnates (Kongsi in Teochew) based in Singapore, who were known to the locals as Tuan Sungai (literally Masters of the River). The Kangchu then were often hired as supervisors or managers by the merchants to keep watch on the day-to-day operations of the gambier and pepper plantations. Temenggong Abu Bakar began to issue contract-style letters of recognition to these Kangchu; the letters were known by their Malay name Surat Tauliah.

As the gambier and pepper plantations expanded in the 1870s, the more established Kangchu were entrusted with larger blocks of farms and made contracts with Chinese merchants from Singapore. The profits generated from harvests of these plantations formed the bulk of Johor's economy, and financed the development of Johor's infrastructure. Abu Bakar's relationship with the Chinese leaders was excellent, and he appointed many of them to political positions in the state. Of particular note, Abu Bakar appointed two Chinese leaders to the Johor State Council: a Kangchu from Chaozhou, Tan Hiok Nee, and a contractor from Taishan, Wong Ah Fook, who also owned gambier and pepper farms in Mersing in the 1880s. As the land along the river banks in Southern Johor was already taken by the earlier waves of Chinese settlers, newer Chinese settlers began migrating northwards in the 1870s and established new gambier and pepper plantations further north; new plantations were established in Yong Peng, Batu Pahat, Benut, Endau and Kota Tinggi. In particular, Abu Bakar actively encouraged Chinese settlers to establish plantations in Muar, shortly after the British Colonial Government ruled in favour of Abu Bakar over Tengku Alam Shah (Sultan Ali's eldest son) and his family, and granted Abu Bakar control of Muar.

=== Decline ===
At the end of the 19th century, Johor's economy began to diversify from gambier and pepper plantations to other agricultural crops. Starting with coffee in 1881, crops such as tapioca, tea, pineapple and rubber were introduced into the state. Coffee and tapioca was quickly abandoned in the 1890s when the value of these crops experienced a drop, while rubber was introduced and quickly established a strong foothold in Johor, as the world demand for rubber increased greatly around 1910. Prices for gambier plunged between 1905 and 1906, and many Kangchu abandoned gambier in favour of rubber. Further decline in the number of gambier and pepper plantations was fuelled by the colonial government's suppression of traditional farming methods employed by the Kangchu for planting gambier and pepper; these method led to soil exhaustion and a depletion of forests which was used as firewood in small factories. A few years before the Kangchu system was abolished, exports for both gambier and pepper plunged by a further 60% between 1912 and 1917.

The British had long frowned upon the Kangchu because of their links with secret societies in Singapore as well as their indulgence in social vices such as gambling and opium smoking, activities which the British had been actively suppressing in Singapore and the Federated Malay States. As early as 1890, the Governor of the Straits Settlements, Cecil Clementi Smith had lobbied Abu Bakar to adopt the Societies Ordinance and ban the Ngee Heng Kongsi, but was promptly turned down. Shortly after the British appointed an adviser to Johor, the British began attributing the high crime rates in the state to Chinese settlers loyal to the Kangchu. In 1915, the Johor state government, now effectively under the control of the British Colonial Government, passed the Societies Enactment which prompted the dissolution of the Ngee Heng Kongsi the following year. The Kangchu system was officially abolished December 1917 in an enactment passed by the Johor state government, which was by then effectively administered by the British colonial government.

== Role of the Kangchu ==
The Temenggong of Johor (later Sultan of Johor) conferred upon the Kangchu with a large degree of administrative autonomy within the plot of land which each was granted. These included the right to collect taxes on behalf for the Temenggong, as well as for the welfare needs among the Chinese coolies living within the plot of land. The Kangchu generally granted tax exemption for the basic consumption by workers within the settlement. Some coolies took on new jobs such as shopkeepers and traders to serve the needs of other coolies within the settlement, and the Kangchu granted tax exemptions to these shopkeepers and traders on the sale of pork, opium and alcohol as well. The Kangchu reserved a portion of the land for the construction of a settlement for the coolies, from which small towns were formed and became the administrative centre of the Kangchu. These administrative centres were generally established within the coolie settlements located at the foot of the river, and were known as Kangkar (literally "Foot of the river", Chinese: 港脚, Pinyin: Gáng Jiǎo, Teochew: Kaang6 Caar8). (Note: These settlements were known as "Chu Kang", (Chinese: 厝港, Pinyin: Cuò Gǎng, Teochew: Chu2 Kaang6) literally "back port" in Chinese, as many settlements were located near the backwater areas of jungles along the river banks. Each "Chu Kang" is named after the owner of the plantation; for instance, Lim Chu Kang (now in modern Singapore, see also List of place names of Kangchu system origin))

The Kangchu acted as the middleman in the bulk purchase of the settlement's commodities through suppliers based in Singapore. In particular, opium was highly popular among the coolies, although frowned upon by the British who took strong measures to suppress its distribution. The Kangchu formed illegal opium syndicates which had links to Chinese leaders from Singapore and other Malay states in the north, particularly Selangor. British contempt for the Kangchu was also fuelled by the coolies' preference for gambling and prostitution, both of which were seen as social vices by the British colonial government. The Kangchu maintained friendly relations with the Temenggong (later Sultan), and worked closely with the Ngee Heng Kongsi in administrative matters. In particular, the state government attempted to forge close relations with the Kangchu by the appointment of a Malay official who was conversant in Teochew and literate in Chinese characters, Mohamed Salleh bin Perang, as the liaison officer between the Temenggong and the Kangchu. Several years later, in the early 1870s, the state government worked closely with the Ngee Heng Kongsi to draft the Kanun Kangchu which had legal clauses that defined the powers of the Kangchu in Johor. The Kanun Kangchu contained 81 clauses in total, and was implemented in 1873.

== Variants outside Johor ==
=== Singapore ===
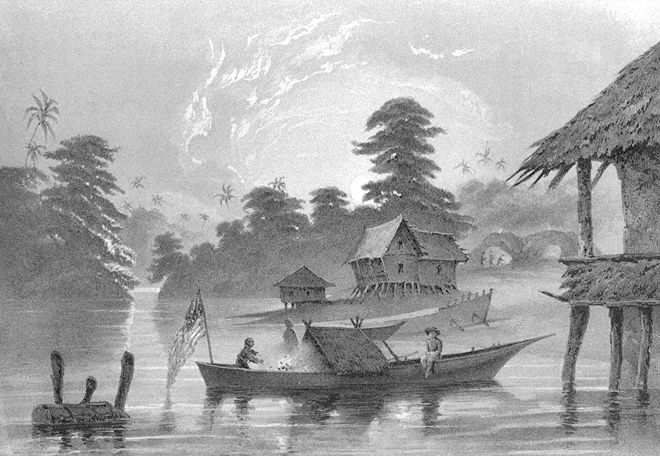
Chinese coolies at the river base of Jurong River in 1860. The gambier and pepper plantation is in the picture background.

Chinese settlers began migrating from the Riau Islands to Singapore in the 19th century shortly before the founding of Singapore by Sir Stamford Raffles in 1819. The native Malays joined the Chinese in growing gambier, although they cultivated it for subsistence rather than for commercial purposes. The number of gambier and pepper farms expanded greatly between 1819 and 1840, fuelled by the increasing demand for gambier by Chinese traders from China as well as pepper by European traders. As land nearer to the town in the south was quickly used up in the 1820s, the Kangchu began to establish farms near the northern parts of Singapore, particularly stretches of land across the Straits of Johor from Jurong, to the west of Punggol in the northeast. By 1851, there were about 800 gambier and pepper farms which covered 75% of Singapore's land surface, of which 24,220 acres (98.0 km^{2}) was dedicated to gambier while 2,614 was dedicated to pepper. (Note: Pepper was cultivated as a Cover crop in gambier and pepper plantations to reduce soil erosion.)

In the 1850s and 1860s, many Kangchu abandoned their plantations in Singapore as gambier produce declined due to over farming of the soil, and began to establish new gambier and pepper plantations in neighbouring Johor. Nevertheless, many of these Kangchu settled down as merchants in Singapore and managed the gambier and pepper farms by proxy, mainly through the liaison body of the Ngee Heng Kongsi which had members in Singapore and Johor. Some of these merchants purchased the property rights of gambier and pepper farms from the Kangchu in Johor, who would then assume managerial tasks to ensure the smooth operation of the plantation and the settlement. (Note: In 1848, approximately 10,000 Teochews in Singapore were hired as coolies to work in gambier and pepper plantations; there were 19,000 Teochews in Singapore altogether, including 200 Teochew gambier and pepper merchants, out of the island's total Chinese population of 39,700. There were no known Hokkiens working as cooliers working in gambier and pepper plantations, although there were a hundred Hokkien gambier and pepper merchants. There were a few Chinese coolies who embraced Roman Catholicism, consisting of Teochews and a few Hakkas who were also working as coolies in Punggol.)

Unlike its counterpart in Johor, the Ngee Heng Kongsi (also called "Ghi Hin Kongsi" in Hokkien) was recognised as an illegal society in Singapore and its activities were actively suppressed by the colonial government. Factionalism appeared within the Ngee Heng Kongsi in Singapore by the 1850s, as business leaders from various dialect groups were unable to agree upon key issues. In particular, relations between the Teochews and Hokkiens were hostile, partly because some Hokkien merchants competed with the Teochew merchants in the gambier and pepper trade, most of whom had established their bases in the Boat Quay area along the Singapore River.

The existence of the Kangchu was not recognised by the British colonial government, even though they exercised a similar degree of autonomy as their counterparts in Johor. Nevertheless, the Kangchu in Singapore had easy access to forested land in Singapore compared to their counterparts in Johor, as the British colonial government adopted a laissez-faire attitude to the Kangchu and imposed very little regulation on their agricultural activities. However, the British were wary of the fact that many Kangchu in Singapore were members of the Ngee Heng Kongsi, which was illegal in Singapore and enjoyed monopoly rights over the regional opium trade. The British appointed a Chinese official among the Kangchu to oversee the social and economic affairs of the gambier and pepper plantations in Singapore and to act as the intermediary.

=== Riau Islands ===
The first gambier and pepper plantations appeared in the Riau Islands in the 1730s, after the Buginese warrior and second Yamtuan Muda of Riau, Daing Chelak, brought Chinese coolies from Malaya to Riau for the purpose of gambier cultivation, which was then widely used for medication among the locals. Another exodus of Chinese migrated to Riau in 1740 following unrest which erupted in Batavia, during which many Chinese were massacred. Chinese settlement in Riau continued into the 18th century, the majority of them coming from the Chaoshan area in Guangdong province, along with a sizeable minority from the southern parts of Fujian province.

Gambier and pepper farming were mainly confined to the Bintan (formerly spelled as Bentan) and Galang Islands. Similar to the Kangchu system in Johor, gambier and pepper plantations were established on grants of land by the Yamtuan Muda of Riau, who would issue land permits (Surat Sungai) to the Kangchu who would direct the operations of the plantation and workers within the settlement. In the early and middle 19th century, many Chinese settlers and merchants from Riau relocated their businesses to Singapore, and established trading links between Riau and Singapore. These settlers and merchants still maintained trading links with Riau, as the Kangchu from Riau often shipped their produce to Singapore for free trade to evade taxes imposed by the Dutch colonial government. Like Singapore, competition for the gambier and pepper trade between the Teochews and Hokkiens in Riau led to communal tensions and sporadic violence in Riau during the 1840s and 1850s. In the early 20th century, the Chinese abandoned gambier and pepper plantations in favour of other agricultural practices, as the worldwide prices for gambier experienced a drastic drop in value and many pepper plants fell prey to a disease plaguing the archipelago.

=== Sarawak ===
The first Chinese immigrants settled along the coastal regions of Sarawak in significant numbers from the 18th century onwards and were engaged in the metal mining industry, mainly for gold and bauxite. As the supply of gold became exhausted from the 1820s onwards, the Chinese miners gradually turned to trade and agriculture. The Chinese of Teochew and Hakka heritage established gambier and pepper plantations in the 1870s and 1880s, and the White Rajah of Sarawak began to organise an administrative system for these plantations similar to the Kangchu system in Johor. The Kangchu of each plantation was appointed by the Charles Brooke, the then-White Rajah. Each Kangchu was given responsibilities to oversee the operations of the plantations under his jurisdiction and the welfare of the coolies living there. In 1875, the British promulgated a set of laws which defined the roles and responsibilities of the Kangchu; they were modelled very closely to the Kanun Kangchu that was introduced by Sultan Abu Bakar of Johor in 1873.

Charles Brooke encouraged the immigration of the Chinese coolies, beginning in the 1860s, to expand the state's gambier and pepper industry. Chinese settlers in neighbouring Sabah and Pontianak also established gambier and pepper plantations, although they existed as independent fiefdoms. These plantations rose to become one of the state's major industries as worldwide prices for gambier went up during the 1880s and 1890s. In the 20th century, as worldwide gambier prices took a dive, the Kangchu channelled their efforts into pepper and opium cultivation in the state. Sarawak's Kangchu system fell into obscurity in the 1920s, as the opium trade with Hong Kong steadily declined during the course of the decade.

== Legacy ==
The Kangchu system facilitated the growth of the gambier and pepper plantations and developed Johor's and Singapore's economies in the 19th century. The development of Johor's inland towns were attributed to the efforts by the various Kangchu, who were responsible for drawing the settlement plan for the coolies living within the plantation they were working on, from which new towns were formed. The Chinese immigrant population in Johor and Singapore grew in size during this period; Riau also experienced a similar growth during the 18th century. As a result of mass immigration by the Chinese into Johor, the Chinese quickly outnumbered the Malays in the state, although many Chinese coolies relocated to Singapore or other parts of Malaya as the gambier and pepper industry declined in the 20th century. (Note: In 1893, there were 210,000 Chinese and 50,000 Malays in Johor, out of a total population of 300,000. In 1931, the Chinese and Indians collectively formed 52.3% of Johor's population.) Several towns and other places in Johor and Singapore, built upon sites of former gambier and pepper plantations, are named after former features of the Kangchu system, and are largely populated by ethnic Chinese.

The Teochew dialect became the lingua franca among the Chinese in many parts of Johor and Riau, as the majority of the Chinese from these areas were of Teochew origin, many of whom were descended from the Chinese coolies who had worked in the gambier and pepper plantations. The Teochews form the second-largest dialect group among Chinese Singaporeans, and many families can trace their family ancestry to immigrants who were Kangchu or coolies in these plantations.

== See also ==
- Muar (town)#History
- Sultan Abu Bakar
- Dato' Bentara Luar Muhamad Salleh bin Perang
- Kapitan Cina
- List of place names of Kangchu system origin
- Kongsi federations

== Bibliography ==
- Ahmad, Abu Talib; Liok, Ee Tian (2003). New Terrains in Southeast Asian History. Ohio University Press. ISBN 0-89680-228-0.
- Andaya, Barbara Watson (1984). A History of Malaysia. Palgrave Macmillan. ISBN 0-312-38121-2.
- Blythe, Wilfred (1969). The Impact of Chinese Secret Societies in Malaya: A Historical Study. Royal Institute of International Affairs, Oxford University Press.
- Chia, Mengtat Jack (2008). "Beyond Riots: Chinese Businessmen and Secret Societies in Singapore 1819-1890" (PDF). NUS History Society e-Journal. Archived from the original (PDF) on 12 October 2008.
- "Imprints In Time : The History of Teochew Opera in Singapore" (PDF). pp. 243–255. Archived from the original (PDF) on 7 September 2021.
- Corfield, Justin J.; Corfield, Robin (2006). Encyclopedia of Singapore. Scarecrow Press. ISBN 0-8108-5347-7.
- Gambe, Annabelle R. (2000). Overseas Chinese Entrepreneurship and Capitalist Development in Southeast Asia. Palgrave Macmillan. ISBN 0-312-23496-1.
- Gerber, James; Guang, Lei (2006). Agriculture and Rural Connections in the Pacific, 1500-1900. Ashgate Publishing. ISBN 0-7546-3978-9.
- Havinden, Michael Ashley; Meredith, David (1996). Colonialism and Development: Britain and its Tropical Colonies, 1850-1960. Routledge. ISBN 0-415-12308-9.
- Hooker, Virginia Matheson (2003). A Short History of Malaysia. Allen & Unwin. ISBN 1-86448-955-3.
- Hussin, Nordin (2007). Trade and Society in the Straits of Melaka: Dutch Melaka and English Penang, 1780-1830. NIAS Press. ISBN 978-87-91114-88-5.
- Jackson, James C. (1968). Planters and Speculators: Chinese and European Agricultural Enterprise in Malaya, 1786-1921. University of Malaya Press. OCLC 435014.
- Lim, Pui Huen (2002). Wong Ah Fook: Immigrant, Builder and Entrepreneur. Times Edition. ISBN 981-232-369-4.
- Mak, Lau-Fong (1995). The dynamics of Chinese dialect groups in early Malaya. Singapore Society of Asian Studies. ISBN 9971-9901-6-4.
- Ooi, Keat Gin (2004). Southeast Asia: A Historical Encyclopedia, from Angkor Wat to East Timor. ABC-CLIO. ISBN 1-57607-770-5.
- Ownby, David; Heidhues, Mary F. Somers (1993). "Secret Societies" Reconsidered: Perspectives on the Social History of Modern South China and Southeast Asia. M.E. Sharpe. ISBN 1-56324-199-4.
- Pan, Lynn (1999). The Encyclopedia of the Chinese Overseas. Harvard University Press. ISBN 0-674-25210-1.
- Radio Televisyen Malaysia (1987). Hari Ini Dalam Sejarah. Jabatan Percetakan Negara.
- Royal Asiatic Society of Great Britain and Ireland (1966). "Journal of the Malaysian Branch of the Royal Asiatic Society". Journal of the Malaysian Branch of the Royal Asiatic Society.
- Royal Asiatic Society of Great Britain and Ireland (1975). "Journal of the Malaysian Branch of the Royal Asiatic Society". Journal of the Malaysian Branch of the Royal Asiatic Society.
- Sidek, Fadzil (1970). Sejarah Orang China di-Tanah Melayu. Pustaka Aman Press.
- Swets; Zeitlinger (1971). "Journal of Southeast Asian Studies". Journal of Southeast Asian Studies. Cambridge University Press.
- Tate, D.J.M (1971). The Making of Modern South-East Asia (Vol II). Oxford University Press.
- Tregonning, K.C. (1964). A History of Modern Malaya. University of London Press.
- Trocki, Carl A. (1979). Prince of Pirates: The Temenggongs and the Development of Johor and Singapore 1784-1885. NUS Press. OCLC 4836297.
- Trocki, Carl A. (2007). Prince of Pirates: The Temenggongs and the Development of Johor and Singapore 1784-1885 (2nd ed.). NUS Press. ISBN 978-9971-69-376-3.
- Trocki, Carl A. (2006). Singapore. Routledge. ISBN 0-415-26386-7.
- Yan, Qinghuang (1986). A Social History of the Chinese in Singapore and Malaya, 1800-1911. Oxford University Press. ISBN 978-0-19-582666-1.
