= Raja Temenggong of Muar =

- Creation date: 1707
- Creation: Johor Sultanate
- Created by: Ibrahim Shah of Johor
- First holder: Engku Sa Akar Di-Raja bin Engku Pasir Diraja
- Last holder: Wan Abdul Rahman bin Engku Mohamad Saleh
- Status: Abolished
- Extinction date: 1935
- Former seat: Muar

Raja Temenggung of Muar (also known by the title of Temenggong Paduka Tuan of Muar) was a noble title used to refer to the family of Dato' Pasir Raja @ Sayyid Ja'afar bin Tun Muhammad Ali Al-'Aydarūs and his descendants, which ruled the Muar fief, which was a part of the Johor Empire from the middle of the seventeenth century onwards.

== History ==
During the mid-seventeenth century, the Sultan of Johor Ibrahim Shah took the hand of Marhum Bakal, the sister of Bendahara Tun Habib Abdul Majid and Sayyid Ja'afar, the Dato' Pasir Raja. As a dowry, Dato' Pasir Raja was granted the fief of Muar. The first Raja Temenggung of Muar was Sa Akar di-Raja whose mausoleum is found Kampung Lubuk Batu, Segamat next to the mausoleum of Bendahara Tepok founder of Segamat; his descendants were similarly buried at Kampung Lubuk Batu. The 7th Raja Temenggung, Engku Abdul Salleh, was buried in Pengkalan Kota, their administrative centre.

In the early nineteenth century, the fief was divided into eight hamlets, each ruled by a chieftain with the Raja Temenggung of Muar as the head of the "federation". Muar was caught in a power grab by the Maharaja of Johor, Abu Bakar after its puppet ruler, Sultan Ali died. The British "offered" its good services to restore calm. Without the British pressure, recognition of Tengku Alam was a foregone conclusion. As the British sided with the Maharaja, the Raja Temenggung and the chieftains were captured and coerced into accepting the Maharaja's lordship. An election which at the suggestion of the British, was held in which the chieftains voted in favour of joining Johor, but Sultan Ali's son, Tengku Alam and the Muar Temenggung were indignant and made vociferous claims upon Muar (even though the Muar Temenggung later relented under heavy pressure). Continued claims by Tengku Alam and his supporters resulted in the outbreak of the Jementah Civil War the following year, in which the British forces (allied with the Maharaja) subdued Tengku Alam's supporters. The Muar Temenggung was subsequently paid an annual stipend by the Maharaja (Sultan after 1885) as part of a settlement treaty made on 5 February 1879 with the annexation of the Muar fiefdom. With the death of Raja Temenggung Wan Abdul Rahman in 1935 and his burial in Kampung Lubok Batu Segamat, The office of the Temenggung of Muar was abolished.

== List of title holders ==
- Engku Sa Akar Di-Raja, 1st Raja Temenggung of Muar
- Engku Sa Amar Di-Raja, 2nd Raja Temenggung of Muar
- Engku Burok, 3rd Raja Temenggung of Muar
- Engku Konik, 4th Raja Temenggung of Muar
- Engku Said, 5th Raja Temenggung of Muar
- Engku Ismail, 6th Raja Temenggung of Muar
- Engku Muhammad Salleh, 7th Raja Temenggung of Muar
- Wan Abdul Rahman, 8th Raja Temenggung of Muar (the last Raja Temenggung of Muar)

== See also ==
- Ali al-Uraidhi ibn Ja'far al-Sadiq
