= Jementah Civil War =

1879 civil war in Johor state, Malaysia

Date	25 October 1879–30 December 1879
Location	Muar, Kesang, Jementah and Segamat (all part of Johor)
Result	Johor state government retakes Muar District

Belligerents
Johor Sultanate; Supported by: United Kingdom	Muar faction

Commanders and leaders
(Johor) Sultan Abu Bakar (Johor) Dato' Salleh bin Perang (Johor) Ungku Ahmad	Tengku Alam Shah; Tengku Nong; Tengku Mat

The Jementah Civil War broke out in 1879 in Jementah in northern Johor when Tengku Alam Shah, the heir of late Sultan Ali of the autonomous principality of Muar refused to surrender the principality to the central administration of Abu Bakar, the then Maharaja of Johor.

The aftermath of the conflict led to the consolidation of Johor's rules over Muar territory again and the opening of Muar town by Sultan Abu Bakar as the first sultan of modern Johor.

== Background ==
Johor was ruled by Temenggong Daeng Ibrahim as the de facto Maharajah of Johor who was more favored than Sultan Ali. As a compromise, Sultan Ali was granted a fiefdom over Muar region, while Temenggong Ibrahim ruled the rest of Johor.

Following Sultan Ali's death in 1877, the custody of the Kesang territory lay in the hands of Ungku Jalil, Sultan Ali's elder brother. Colonel Edward Anson, the acting Governor of the Straits Settlements, instituted an election for the Temenggong Paduka Tuan of Muar and the territory's chieftains to decide on the destiny of the Kesang territory, and they voted unanimously for Maharaja Abu Bakar as their leader.

Ungku Jalil handed over the custodianship of the Kesang territory and the Governor William Robinson recognised the fiefdom of Muar as having returned to Maharaja Abu Bakar's central administration in Johor Bahru, which greatly upsets Tengku Alam and many of his followers.

Tengku Alam began his moves by asking his cousins Tengku Nong and Tengku Mat to spread false information to the residents of Muar district to be on his side. He also gathered some powerful warriors for the battle.

== Conflict ==
Tengku Alam and his followers launched the first blow of the war by seizing Jementah town, just outside Segamat, on 25 October 1879. The headman or governor of Jementah reported to the ruler of Johor, Maharaja Abu Bakar, who responded by sending a powerful force led by his cousin, Ungku Ahmad. Ungku Ahmad was a great tactician who contributed to the Johor Government's rapid victory.

Dato' Mohammed Salleh bin Perang, also known as Dato' Bentara Luar, was deployed by the government on 2 December to assist the government army. As a strategy, he split the Johor government army into four units to fight enemies easier. Each unit contained about 100 men.

By mid-December, the government army conquered more enemy strongholds and finally gained total victory at dawn on 30 December after a surprise attack on the enemy's final redoubt. Since then, the original District of Muar, which then included Segamat, was reintegrated into Johor.

== Aftermath ==
The most notable event that happened as a result of the Johor government's victory in the Jementah Civil War was the opening of Muar as a new modern town by the Maharaja Abu Bakar, where the town was conferred the Bandar Maharani new title. Besides this event, the soldiers from both sides who later resided in the areas of Jementah and Segamat opened the residencies (mukim) of Pagoh, as well as some villages there.

== See also ==
- Raja Temenggong of Muar

== Sources ==
- YM Ungku Mohd. Zaman bin Tahir (1996). Segamat: Sejarah dan Mitosnya. Al-Kafilah Enterprise.
- Perang Jementah - the complete explanation of Jementah Civil War in Malay
