= Sultan Ibrahim Jamek Mosque =

Mosque in Muar, Johor, Malaysia

- Masjid Jamek Sultan Ibrahim ﻣﺴﺟﺪ ﺟﺎﻣﻊ ﺳﻠﻄﻦ ﺇﺑﺮﺍﻫﯿﻢ
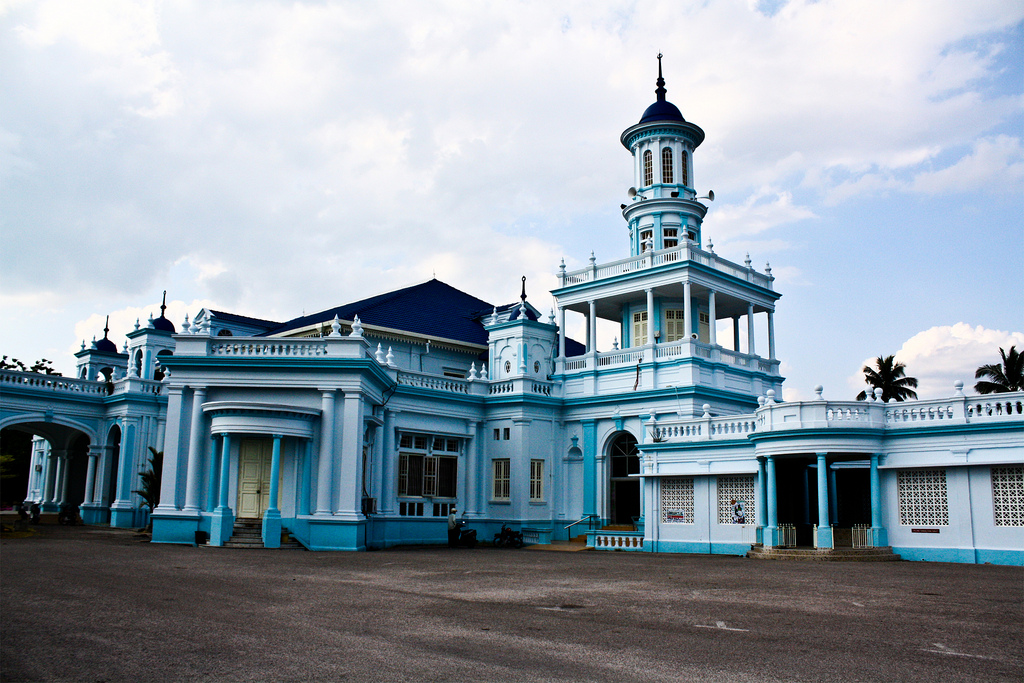

- Location within Johor

Religion
- Affiliation: Islam
- Branch/tradition: Sunni

Location
- Location: Muar, Johor, Malaysia
- Interactive map of Sultan Ibrahim Jamek Mosque
- Coordinates: 2.046468°N 102.558267°E

Architecture
- Type: mosque
- Minaret: 1

Sultan Ibrahim Jamek Mosque (Malay: Masjid Jamek Sultan Ibrahim) is a historical mosque in Muar Town, Johor, Malaysia. It is situated along Jalan Petri, close to the mouth of Muar River.

== History ==
The first Muar Jamek Mosque was completed in 1887. In the 1920s, a committee was formed to consider building a new Jamek mosque for Muar. Following a bid to raise funds from the public, the committee in charge of building the new mosque successfully raised RM10,000 for the purpose. The committee then put forward the people's aspiration to the Sultan and obtained the royal consent.

In 1925, works to construct Sultan Ibrahim Jamek Mosque began. Five years later, in 1930, the mosque was completed and was officially opened by Johor's Dato' Menteri Besar, Dato Mustafa bin Jaafar.

== Architecture ==
It is built with influences of Western style and Middle Eastern style.

== See also ==
- Islam in Malaysia
