= Muhammad Salleh Perang =

Yang Berhormat Dato' Bentara Luar Muhamad Salleh Perang SPMJ
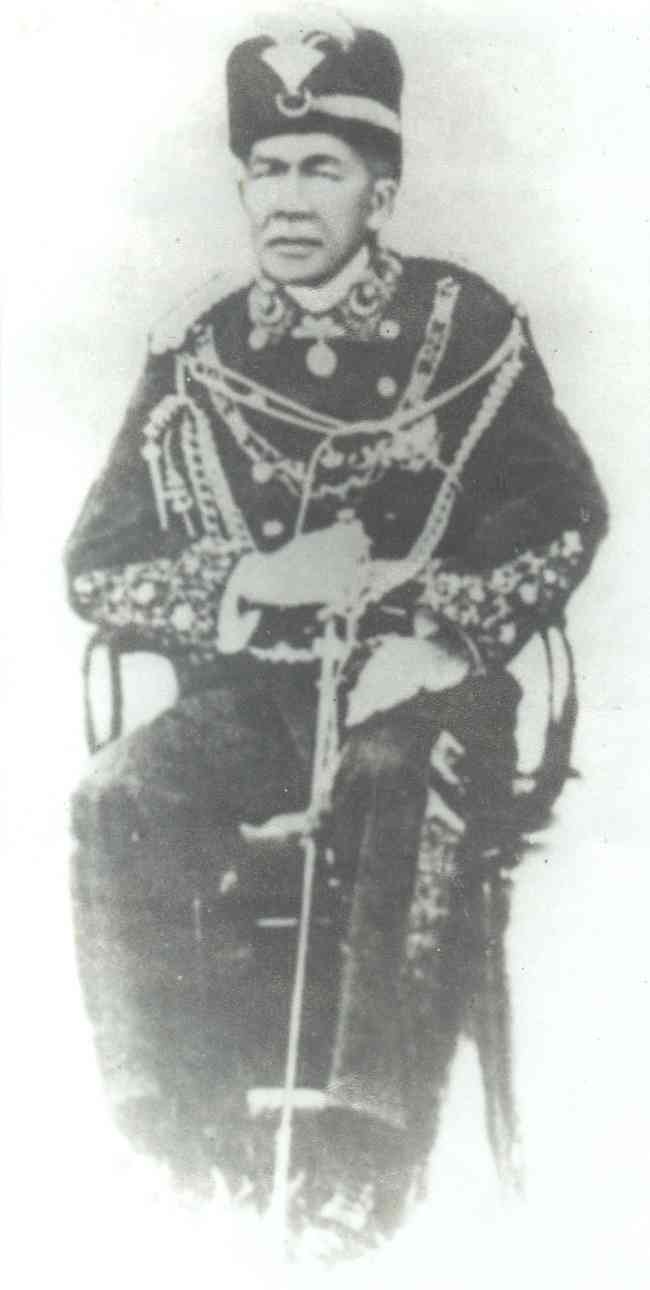
- Portrait of Muhammad Salleh Perang
- Born: 1841; Teluk Belanga, Singapore, Straits Settlements
- Died: 2 July 1915 (aged 73–74); Johor Baharu, Unfederated Malay States
- Other name: Dato' Bentara Luar Muhamad Salleh bin Perang
- Occupation: Government official
- Known for: Development of Johor State, Malaysia

Muhamad Salleh bin Perang (1841 – 2 July 1915) was a Malay statesman, traveller, and military leader who served in the administration of the independent Sultanate of Johor from 1856 to 1912, today part of Malaysia. Carrying the title of Dato Bentara Luar, he was in charge of establishing new towns and settlements in Johor, as well as surveying and mapping its territories. He also accompanied Sultan Abu Bakar on the latter's official visit to Meiji Japan in 1883, recording his impressions in the Tarikh Dato' Bentara Luar published in 1928.

== Map making and development tasks ==
Salleh was a bureaucrat whose duty was to manage and develop lands and taking care of gambir and black pepper plantations. As the Head of the Land Management and State Survey, he successfully drew a complete map of Johore annotated in Jawi with geographical details for most of the district of Johore plus roads and cities that were planned for development during his tenure; this information was then used to plan further developments of Johore. The complete map was the first of its kind plotted for any state in the Malay Peninsula.

Salleh was involved in the development and planning of the cities of Bandar Maharani (1888) and Batu Pahat (1893).

He was knowledgeable in speaking Teochew and understanding Chinese culture which made him close to the Chinese people brought in by the Kangchu system. In the 1880s, he accompanied the Sultan on a visit to Qing China and Japan. He started off as the commissioner of the Loyal Force and ended up as member of State Legislature and Cabinet.

== Developing Batu Pahat ==
On 11 November 1893, Sultan Abu Bakar instructed Salleh to begin development of Batu Pahat from its prior state as a small town seven miles from the Batu Pahat River into a fully fledged city. He started by preparing roads, government departments, and a modern town administration system. The official opening of Batu Pahat was held on 1 January 1894 attended by important dignitaries, influential people, and chiefs of nearby villages. The city prospered under him as the Sultan's representative governor. He later became commissioner and encouraged villagers to develop farms and irrigation works. At the same time, foreign investors opened businesses in Batu Pahat. Salleh's contributions were recognized by Ungku Sulaiman bin Daud, the chief commissioner of Johore, during his official visit on 21 December 1896.

== Retirement ==
The death of Sultan Abu Bakar led the British government to increase their influence in the Johor government. Slowly, the district officials throughout Johor, capable Malays in administration and development posts, including Muhammad Salleh Perang himself, were replaced.

On 3 April 1909, Salleh received a letter from Dato' Seri Amar Di Raja Abdul Rahman Andak asking him to retire from his post. All his life, he had shown his loyalty to the Sultan and proved that he was able to execute his responsibilities with his own effort. The Dato' Bentara Luar accused him of treason but no strong evidence was found. On 21 May 1912, Salleh resigned at the age of 71. He was replaced by Ungku Ahmad bin Ungku Muhammad Khalid as the commissioner of Batu Pahat. Under him, the Malay district commissioner was jointly responsible with the British commissioner for administration.

== Death ==
He died on 21 July 1915 (18 Sya'aban 1333) and was buried at Mahmoodiah Royal Mausoleum in Johor Bahru, Johor.
