= Umbai =

Town in Jasin, Melaka, Malaysia

Coordinates: 2°10′N 102°20′E

Umbai in Jasin District

Umbai is a mukim and town in Jasin District in the Malaysian state of Malacca.

== Tourist attractions ==
- Sultan Ali of Johor Mausoleum (Malay: Makam Sultan Ali Johor)
- Umbai Floating Ikan Bakar Village (Malay: Perkampungan Ikan Bakar Terapung Umbai)

== Transportation ==
- Anjung Batu Jetty (Malay: Jeti Anjung Batu) – Jetty for ferries to Besar Island.

== See also ==
- List of cities and towns in Malaysia by population
