= Ali Iskandar of Johor =

Ali Iskandar Shah

Sultan of Johor
- Reign: 1835–1855
- Predecessor: Hussein Shah I
- Successor: Abu Bakar

Sultan of Muar
- Reign: 1855–1877
- Born: 1824; Singapore, Straits Settlements
- Died: 21 June 1877 (aged 52–53); Umbai, Malacca, British Malaya
- Burial: Sultan Ali's Mausoleum, Umbai, Malacca, British Malaya
- Spouse: Tengku Ngah; Daeng Siti; Cik Serimbuk
- Issue: Sultan Allauddin Alam Shah; Tengku Mahmud Putra; Tengku Mansur Putra; Tengku Abdullah; Tengku Puteh; Tengku Sulong; Tengku Sambak; Tengku Cik Fatima; Tengku Mariam; Tengku Sharifah
Names
- Sultan Ali Iskandar Shah ibni Al-Marhum Sultan Hussein Muazzam Shah
- House: Bendahara dynasty
- Father: Sultan Hussein Shah
- Mother: Tengku Perbu
- Religion: Sunni Islam

Sultan Ali Iskandar Shah I ibni almarhum Sultan Ahmad Hussein Muazzam Shah I (Malay: سلطان علي اسکندر شاه اول ابن المرحوم سلطان احمد حسين معظم شاه اول) was the 20th Sultan of Johor, who succeeded his father, Sultan Hussein Shah after the latter died of natural causes in 1835. Over the next twenty years, Sultan Ali's claim to being the Sultan of Johor was only recognised by some merchants and a few Malays. Like his father, Sultan Ali was a puppet monarch and played a minimal role in the administrative affairs of the state, which came under the charge of the Temenggong and the British. In 1855, Sultan Ali ceded the sovereignty rights of Johor (except Kesang in Muar) to Temenggong Daeng Ibrahim, in exchange for formal recognition as the "Sultan of Johor" by the British and a monthly allowance. Following the secession of Johor, Sultan Ali was granted administrative charge over Muar until his death in 1877, and in most administrative matters, was often styled as the "Sultan of Muar".

== Sultan of Johor ==
=== Early years ===
Tengku Ali succeeded his father in 1835 as the Sultan of Johor, but was not recognised as the Sultan of Johor for the first few years of his reign. A proclamation by the British colonial government in September 1840 granted him the right as the legitimate heir as his father's successor, but not amounting to recognition as the "Sultan of Johor".

In the 1840s, Johor began to receive the first Chinese settlers (mainly immigrants from Swatow and Chaozhou). The young Temenggong, Tun Daeng Ibrahim, took up the administrative tasks of the state. He imposed taxes on these settlers, which went to the Temenggong's charge. However, unlike the Temenggong, Sultan Ali was unwilling to involve himself with the affairs of the state but at the same time complained about receiving an insufficient allowance from the British. He was well known for his penchant for an extravagant lifestyle, and had accumulated considerable debts by the 1850s.

Meanwhile, loyalty among the local Malays in Johor to the ruling classes became increasingly divided between the royalty and the nobility. In 1852, Thomas Church, the Resident Councillor of Singapore, summed up the situation of the Malays along the east coast of the Malay Peninsula:

In this neighbourhood, there are two parties, on one side, the Sultan of Lingga, the Sultan of Trengganu, and the young princes of Johore; on the other, the Raja Bendahara of Pahang, and the Temenggong Sri Maharaja.

Nevertheless, there was no major hostility as a result of the division of loyalty between the royalty and the nobility. In the same year, an English merchant, W.H. Read, controlled Sultan Ali's royal seal in exchange for a promise to liquidate his debts. Read had been an active supporter of Sultan Ali's goal of being recognized as the Sultan of Johor and gaining control of the state's revenue, with the Temenggong as his vassal. As a result of economic and political pressure from these traders, the Governor did consider granting formal recognition to Sultan Ali as the legitimate ruler of Johor, but in the process, he received a strong protest from Temenggong Daeng Ibrahim and his young son, Abu Bakar.

By the early 1850s, Johor was effectively under the control of the Temenggong; followers who attempted to act in Sultan Ali's interests were quickly expelled by force by the Temenggong's followers.

=== Secession of Johor ===
A series of negotiations between Sultan Ali and the Temenggong ensued with the British colonial government acting as the intermediary, after Sultan Ali had questioned the Temenggong's right to keep the state revenue to himself. Initially, the Temenggong proposed to split the trade revenue of Johor on condition that Sultan Ali surrendered his claim of sovereignty over Johor. The proposal was declined by Sultan Ali. Both parties agreed to seek the direct intervention of the British government, among which, the British Governor of the Straits Settlement, Colonel William John Butterworth, and his successor, Edmund Blundell were roped in to act as meditators.

The British favoured the prospect of the Temenggong in taking over the administration of Johor from the Sultan. Sultan Ali's claim to sovereignty was refuted by the British and the Temenggong, who was quick to point out that the Sultan's late father, Sultan Hussein Shah had never actively pursued sovereignty rights over Johor in spite of his recognition by the British in the 1824 Anglo-Dutch Treaty. At that time, Johor came under the effective charge of the Temenggong's late father, Abdul Rahman, as with Pahang, which was under the control of the Bendahara. Further documents revealed that if Johor were to be under the control of a monarch, de jure sovereignty would have been laid under the charge of the Sultan of Lingga, Sultan Mahmud Muzaffar Shah and not with Sultan Ali.

The Temenggong and Sultan Ali submitted their proposals to the British Governor in April 1854. The Temenggong agreed to the Sultan's request of his titular recognition as the Sultan of Johor, but was adamant of maintaining absolute charge over the whole of Johor. On the other hand, Sultan Ali had expressed his wish to the governor that the Kesang territory (around Muar) should be directly governed by him, citing reasons that some of his ancestors were buried there. The British persuaded the Temenggong to concede to Sultan Ali's request and accepted after much consideration.

A treaty was concluded on 10 March 1855, in which Sultan Ali formally ceded his sovereignty rights of Johor to the Temenggong permanently with the exception of the Kesang territory (around Muar). In exchange, Sultan Ali was guaranteed the recognition the title of "Sultan" by the Temenggong and the British government and received a lump sum of $5,000 as compensation. Sultan Ali was also promised a further incentive of a monthly allowance of $500 from the Temenggong, under the pressure of Governor Edmund Blundell (the British Governor of Singapore), who hoped to put an end to Sultan Ali's financial complaints and problems.

== Sultan of Muar ==
=== Administration in Muar ===
Sultan Ali delegated the administrative affairs of Muar to the Raja Temenggung of Muar (also known by the title of Temenggong Paduka Tuan of Muar) and spent most of his time in Malacca. Muar was sparsely populated in 1855 and had a population of 800 and no formal structure of government was formed. In 1860, Sultan Ali reportedly borrowed $53,600 from a Chettiar money lender, Kavana Chana Shellapah. Sultan Ali signed an agreement with Shellapah to contribute a portion of his monthly allowance to repay his debt. However, Sultan Ali found himself unable to settle his debts in time, and an angry Shellapah wrote to the British government in 1866. Pressured to liquidate his debts in time, Sultan Ali granted Shellapah the right to trade off Muar to the Temenggong of Johor as mortgage if he was unable to pay off his debts in time.

His relations with Temenggong Daeng Ibrahim remained strained; in 1860, Sultan Ali allowed a Bugis adventurer, Suliwatang, the chiefs of Rembau and Sungei Ujong to settle in Muar and prepare themselves for an attack on Johor. Such bad blood between the Sultan and Temenggong Daeng Ibrahim passed down to the Temenggong's son, Abu Bakar, who succeeded his father after the former died in 1862. Shortly after Abu Bakar became the Temenggong of Johor, he sent a letter to Sultan Ali to reassert Johor's sovereignty over Segamat. Continued disputes over the sovereignty of Segamat led to an outbreak of a war between the Temenggong's men with the Sultan's. Eleven years later in 1873, attempts made by Suliwatang to collect custom taxes from inhabitants at the Muar estuary led to further conflict with Abu Bakar's (who became Maharaja in 1868) men.

During the remaining years of Sultan Ali's reign, there was no visible economic activity in Muar. Nevertheless, he delegated the duty of collecting Muar's revenues to Suliwatang and his agents, all of whom were later poisoned and killed by the Temenggong Paduka Tuan of Muar. In 1868, Sultan Ali put Babu Ramasamy, a Tamil schoolmaster in charge of collecting the Muar's revenues. A European miner approached Sultan Ali in 1872, in which he was granted exclusive mining rights over the entire Kesang territory for five years. Three years later, an American trader approached the Sultan, in which he gave the American the concessionary grant of purchasing 45 square miles (120 km^{2}) of land within the Kesang territory.

=== Death and succession dispute ===
Sultan Ali spent his last years in Umbai, Malacca, and supported himself with a small monthly stipend which the British East India Company had granted him. He built a palace for himself and lived with his third wife, Cik' Sembuk until his death in June 1877, and was buried in a Mausoleum within the confines of the Umbai mosque. Shortly before his death, Sultan Ali willed the Kesang territory to Tengku Mahmud, his 11-year-old son with Cik' Sembuk. His decision was met with considerable disproval among some Malays in Singapore, who felt that Tengku Alam Shah should be the heir to the Kesang territory as he was the oldest son with Daeng Siti, who was the daughter of a Bugis nobleman, while Cik' Sembuk was a commoner. At the time of Sultan Ali's death, custody of the Kesang territory lay in the hands of Ungku Jalil, Sultan Ali's elder brother. Ungku Jalil handed over the custodianship of the Kesang territory to Maharaja Abu Bakar, after the British government held an election for the Temenggong Paduka Tuan of Muar and the territory's chieftains to decide on the destiny of the Kesang territory, and voted unanimously for Maharaja Abu Bakar as their leader. The British Governor handed over administrative charge of the Kesang territory over to the Maharaja, which upset Tengku Alam Shah and many of his supporters. Their continued claims to the Kesang territory led to the instigation of the Jementah Civil War in 1879.

== See also ==
- Jementah Civil War

== Notes ==
Preceded by Sultan Hussein Shah	Sultan of Johor; 1835–1855	Succeeded by Sultan Abu Bakar
