= Tengku Alam Shah =

Prince of the House of Bendahara

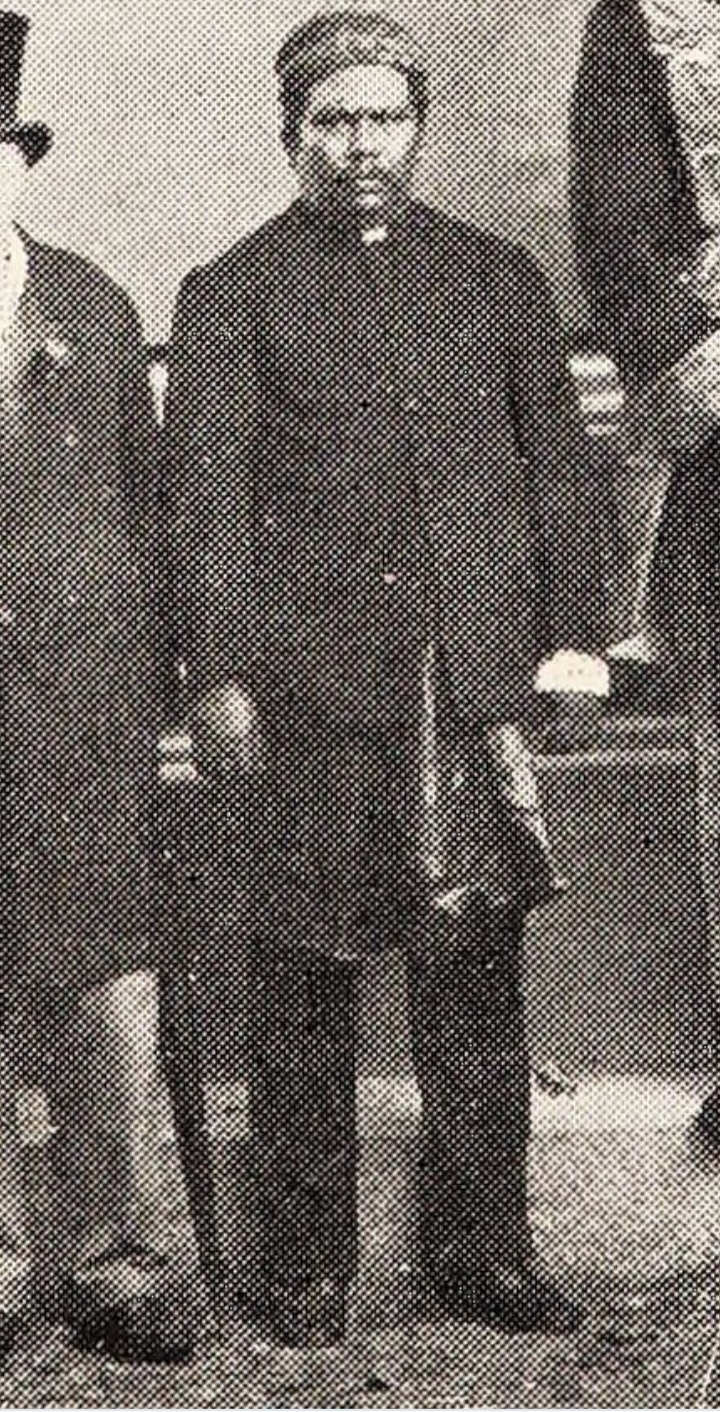
- Alam in 1887
- Born: June 1846; Kampong Glam, Singapore, Strait Settlements
- Died: 26 August 1891 (aged 45); Kampong Glam, Singapore, Strait Settlements
- Burial: Sultan Mosque, Singapore
- Spouse: Tengku Mariam
- Issue: 1. Tengku Haji Ali Iskandar Shah II; 2. Tengku Gedung Aishah; 3. Tengku Mariam; 4. Tengku Nuteh
- House: House of Bendahara (Johor branch)
- Father: Ali of Johor
- Mother: Daing Siti
- Religion: Sunni Islam

Tengku Alam Shah, Tengku Ali Iskandar Shah was a prince of the Johor branch of the House of Bendahara. Born in Istana Kampong Glam, he was the oldest son of Sultan Ali, the 19th Sultan of Johor by his second wife, Daing Siti. Following his father's death in 1877, Tengku Alam and his supporters actively pursued his claims to the Kesang territory and eventually the entire sultanate, when he was publicly proclaimed as the Sultan of Johor and Pahang with the regnal name of Alauddin Alam Shah during his marriage ceremony in 1879.

The proclamation alarmed Maharaja Abu Bakar, who feared his political position might be threatened. Within the same year, after repeated attempts to gain recognition for his claims failed, a brief civil war erupted in Jementah in 1879. He was eventually defeated by Abu Bakar, who was aided by the British.

== Succession dispute ==
Sultan Ali's third son by Cik Sembuk, Tengku Mahmud was groomed for succession. When the Sultan died in 1877, he nominated Tengku Mahmud to inherit the Kesang territory. The Kesang territory was a small district in northwestern Johor, situated between the Muar and Kesang rivers, that served as the final personal domain of the displaced House of Bendahara branch. Under the 1855 treaty that forced Sultan Ali to surrender sovereign rights over the rest of mainland Johor to the House of Temenggong, Kesang was specifically carved out and left under Sultan Ali's direct rule.

The Sultan's decision took Tengku Alam and his supporters in Singapore to anger, who felt that Tengku Alam should inherit his father's properties given that he was the eldest son. Furthermore, Cik Serimbuk's commoner background stood out against Daing Siti's, who was the daughter of a Bugis nobleman.

The British on their part, refused to recognise Sultan Ali's will on his son's (Tengku Mahmud) hereditary claims to the Kesang territory. Meanwhile, the chieftains and village headmen in the Kesang territory held their own elections for a new leader, and voted for the Maharaja of Johor, Abu Bakar to take charge of Muar, which the British accepted the outcome of the poll. The Acting Governor of the Straits Settlements, Edward Anson, allowed Abu Bakar to take interim control over the Kesang territory.

Tengku Alam and his supporters were extremely unhappy with Maharaja Abu Bakar's intervention over the Kesang territory. A long time of Tengku Alam, W.H. Read helped to lobby in Tengku Alam's cause. Supporters of Tengku Alam had criticised the irregularities in the electoral process, by claiming that the Maharaja had coerced the Muar chiefs into voting for him prior to the election, and called for an election with Tengku Alam's family members as the electors. Tengku Alam's supporters argued that the 1855 secession treaty which Sultan Ali had signed with Temenggong of Johor guaranteed the hereditary rights of Sultan Ali's family members to the Kesang territory. Tengku Alam's claims were fell on deaf ears, and the British government, with the assistance of Engku Mandak, proceeded with the electoral process into 1878. Meanwhile, the British authorities allowed Tengku Alam to inherit the $500 monthly allowance which Sultan Ali had received from the Temenggong's family, and gave him an additional $68 monthly allowance from the British East India Company. An angry Tengku Alam was declined these allowances from the British, and was said to have used abusive language when they were offered to him.

The following January, on 11 January 1879, a few hundred Bugis and Malay supporters proclaimed Tengku Alam "Sultan Alauddin 'Alam Shah, Sultan of Johor and Pahang" during his marriage ceremony. This proclamation generated serious concern from Maharaja Abu Bakar and the British government, who feared it signalled a potential threat to Abu Bakar's political position and that Tengku Alam might try to reclaim the entirety of Johor, especially after Tengku Alam publicly declared his challenge to Abu Bakar over the Kesang territory. In October, a frustrated Tengku Alam and his supporters launched a civil war in Jementah which was quickly subdued by the British authorities.

== Last years and death ==
Tengku Alam returned to Singapore and lived out his remaining years quietly at Istana Kampong Glam, where he died in 1891. He was recognised as the head of the royal household by his family members, and occasionally handled administrative affairs pertaining to the royal household. Five years after his death, members of the royal family disputed over inheritance rights of Istana Kampong Glam in Court. The Istana was recognised as state property, but the British government (and later the Singapore government) quietly allowed members of the royal household to live in it until the 1990s.
