= Cecil Robbins Cherry =

British businessman (born 1939)

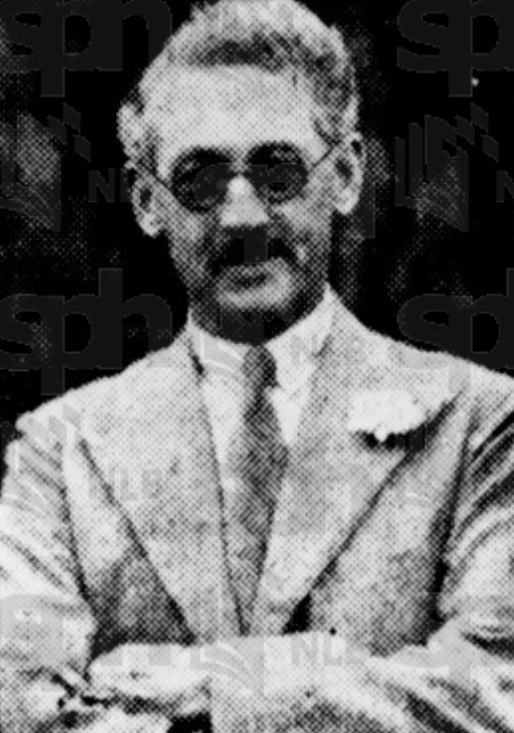
Cherry in 1939

Cecil Robbins Cherry was the Eastern head of Boustead & Co. and the chairman of the Singapore Chamber of Commerce. He served as the chamber's representative on the Legislative Council of the Straits Settlements.

== Early life ==
Cherry was born in Windsor, Berkshire.

== Career ==
After leaving school, Cherry was employed at the private banking house Thomas Ashby & Co. in Staines-upon-Thames. He remained with the company after it was absorbed by Barclays in 1905, and worked as a bank inspector. He came to Singapore in 1913 and joined Boustead & Co. He became the company's Eastern head in 1934. In the same year, he began serving on the committee of the Singapore Chamber of Commerce and was elected a member of the Straits Settlements Association. He was chairman of the board of directors of Cold Storage.

Cherry was appointed a Justice of the Peace in 1935. In the following year, he was elected Deputy Chairman of the Chamber of Commerce. He was a member of the Singapore Harbour Board. In March 1938, he began acting as an unofficial member of the Legislative Council of the Straits Settlements in place of Edwin Norman Collet Woollerton. In October 1938, he was appointed a member of the advisory committee of the Malayan Rubber Fund in place of James Robertson. Cherry was appointed chairman of the Singapore Chamber of Commerce in 1939. In April, he began acting as the chamber's representative in the Legislative Council of the Straits Settlements in place of Sir John Bagnall, who had gone on leave. Just prior to being nominated an official member of the council, he had been acting as an unofficial member for Joseph William de Piro. He resigned as both chairman of the Chamber of Commerce and a member of the legislative council in April of the following year, and was replaced by John Ivo Dawson. He served as Director of Salvage in 1941. He also served as a director of the Alexandra Brickworks and chairman of Haytor Rubber Estates.

In March 1948, Cherry became a member of the board of directors of Standard Chartered. He was appointed chairman of the Malakoff Rubber Estates in place of Sir Harold Snagge, who had resigned. He resigned from his position on the board of directors of Standard Chartered in July 1955 on his retirement from business in London.

== Personal life ==
Cherry married Mary Ada Stopford, a prominent golfer, on 19 March 1934 in Winchester, England. Rifle shooting was a hobby of his. Prior to arriving in Singapore, he participated in club shoots in Bisley, Surrey. Cherry served with the Singapore Volunteer Artillery before and during World War I. He was a supporter of the Singapore Rowing Club, which merged into the Singapore Yacht Club in 1921.
