= Maritime Building =

Coordinates: 1°17′04.5″N 103°51′09.7″E

- The Maritime Building in 1930

- Location within Singapore
- Former names: Union Insurance Society of Canton Building; Union Building

General information
- Status: Demolished
- Location: 20 Collyer Quay, Singapore 049319, Singapore, Singapore
- Completed: 1924; 102 years ago
- Demolished: 1982; 44 years ago

Technical details
- Floor count: 7
- Lifts/elevators: 3

Design and construction
- Architect: Denis Santry
- Architecture firm: Swan & MacLaren

The Maritime Building, initially known as the Union Insurance Society of Canton Building, or simply the Union Building, was a building located along the waterfront of the Singapore River in Collyer Quay.

== Description ==
The building was seven storeys tall and had a basement. The building had three lifts. The frontage of the building was designed in the style of English renaissance, and comprised a row of arches on the building's ground floor, colonnades on three floors, and an ornamental cornice projecting seven feet. The building featured a flat roof. A 60 ft tower surmounted the centre of the building.

The entrance hall of the building was large and spacious. The entrance door was 15 ft high and was made of bronze. Both the floors and the walls of the building were made of different types of marble, and the ceiling was decorated with mosaics. The ground floor was made of dressed granite, which was on top of artificial granite. A pair of bronze lamps hung out of the entrance of the building.

== History ==
The proposal for a new building in Collyer Quay was made by the Union Insurance Society of Canton in February 1922. Architectural firm Swan and MacLaren were commissioned to design the building. The building was to be built on site of the former office building of Boustead & Co., which lasted from 1866 to December 1921, when the land was sold to the Union Insurance Society of Canton. Construction of the building commenced in May 1922 and ended in 1924, costing $1,125,000. The architect of the building was Irish architect Denis Santry of Swan and MacLaren. The official opening ceremony of the building was held on 26 September 1925 at noon. The building was used by British Information Services in 1963.

The building was sold to Island Investment and Agency Corporation in 1964. The building was renamed as Maritime Building by the Island Investment and Agency Corporation in January 1965. Tenants of the building at that time included Boustead & Co., the Far East Shipping Company, Ben Line Steamers, Fraser and Company, Peat Marwick and Mitchell, and Suckling and McDonald.

A proposal to demolish the building was made in 1980. Boustead & Co. moved out of the building in 1981. The Maritime building was demolished in 1982, and the former site of the building was sold to the Orient Overseas Container Line. The building had to be demolished from the top, as knocking down the building would cause debris to land on passing cars. The building was replaced by the Tung Centre.
