= William Napier (lawyer) =

Scottish lawyer and newspaper editor

1st Lieutenant-Governor of Labuan
- In office 1848–1850
- Governor: James Brooke
- Preceded by: Newly created
- Succeeded by: John Scott

Personal details
- Born: 1804 Scotland
- Died: 1879 (aged 74–75) England
- Spouse: Maria Frances Vernon (m. 1844–1879)
- Domestic partner: Unknown Malacca woman (1828–1831)
- Children: Catherine Napier (daughter), with Unknown Malacca woman; James Brooke Napier (son); Maria J. Napier (daughter); Robert J. Napier (son); Harry B. Napier (son)
- Parents: Macvey Napier (father); Catharine Napier (mother)
- Relatives: David Skene Napier (brother)
- Occupation: lawyer, newspaper editor
- Profession: law
- Known for: First lawyer in Singapore
- Committees: Straits Settlements Association (Chairman)
- Other names: Royal Billy

William "Royal Billy" Napier (1804–1879), was a Scottish lawyer and newspaper editor who primarily developed his career in Singapore, and was also the first Lieutenant-Governor of Labuan from 1848 to 1850.

== History ==
At least two of Macvey Napier's sons lived in Singapore in its early days. David Skene Napier, a merchant, was one of the first magistrates appointed by Sir Stamford Raffles in 1823.

Prior to follow in to Singapore after his brother, William Napier had a daughter, Catherine Napier in 1829, by a Eurasian woman from Malacca.

In 1831, Napier arrived in Singapore and was appointed as Singapore's first law agent in 1833. He was also one of the four founders of the Singapore Free Press on 1 October 1835, and edited that weekly newspaper until 1846, when he returned to the United Kingdom for health reasons.

In 1844, he married Maria Frances Vernon, the widow of architect George Coleman and adopted her son, George Vernon Coleman, who would die at sea on board of HMS Maeander in 1848 at age 4. They soon had a daughter in 1846, Maria J Napier.

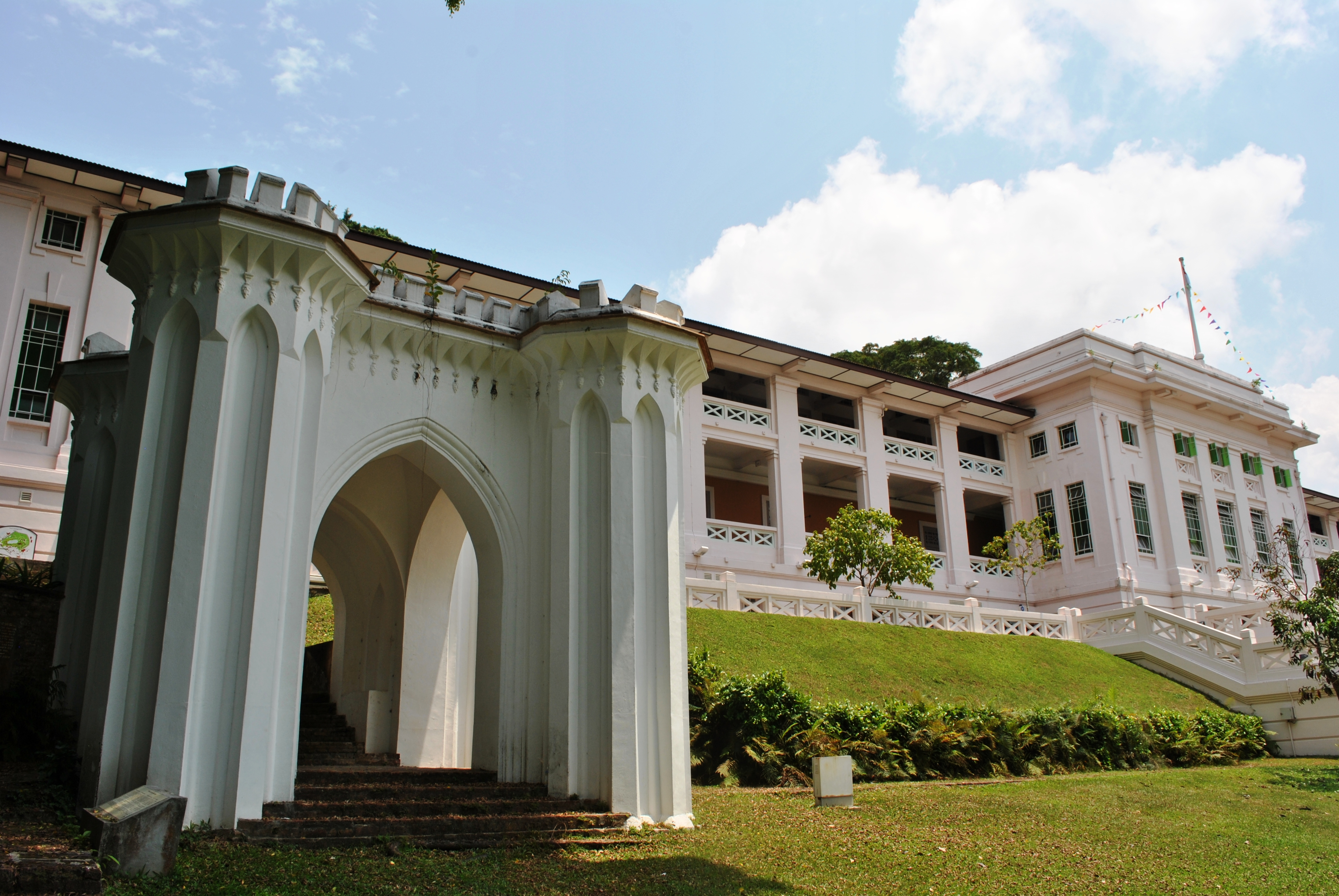
Memorial to James Brooke Napier, Fort Canning

Napier had an infant son with Maria in 1847, James Brooke Napier, but he died at sea on 17 February 1848 at the very young age of 5 months old. The infant James Brooke Napier was commemorated by the largest monument on the Christian Cemetery at the Government Hill, Singapore.

William Napier had befriended James Brooke in Singapore and, on being appointed Governor of the new British colony of Labuan in 1848, Brooke chose him to be his deputy as Lieutenant-Governor of Labuan.

In 1848, William Napier's daughter, Catherine Napier, met Hugh Low, the Colonial Secretary to Labuan, on the sea-voyage from England to Labuan to establish the new government: they were married, en route, in Singapore. They had a son Hugh "Hugo" Brooke Low in 1849 and a daughter Catherine "Kitty" Elizabeth Low in 1850. The marriage was ended with the death of Catherine Napier from fever in Labuan in 1851.

Brooke summarily dismissed Napier of his position in 1850 for alleged misconduct. Napier remained in Singapore as Attorney. Napier was also a legal adviser to Abu Bakar Ibni Al-Marhum from 1855 to 1857.

== Retirement and death ==
William Napier later retired "from the East" in 1857 and returned to England, his house which was built in Tyersall in 1854, was advertised for sale by Boustead & Co. in March 1857. Napier and his wife Maria Frances Vernon had two more sons, Robert J. Napier in 1860, and Harry B. Napier in 1861.

Napier became the first Chairman of the Straits Settlements Association, set up in London in 1868.

William Napier died in England in 1879.

== Legacy ==
The Napier Road was commemorated in 1853 in honor of Napier for his accomplishments and contributions in Singapore. The Tyersall Road and Tyersall Avenue (a renamed Garden Road) was named in 1890 and 1924 respectively after his demolished Tyersall House. The name Tanglin was believed to be derived from the Chinese name of his former Tyersall estate as Tang Leng which his house was once built on.

Napier is unrelated to Walter John Napier, the lawyer who founded the law firm Drew and Napier.

Government offices
Preceded by Newly Created	Lieutenant-Governor of Labuan; 1848–1850	Succeeded by John Scott
