= Straits Produce =

Magazine

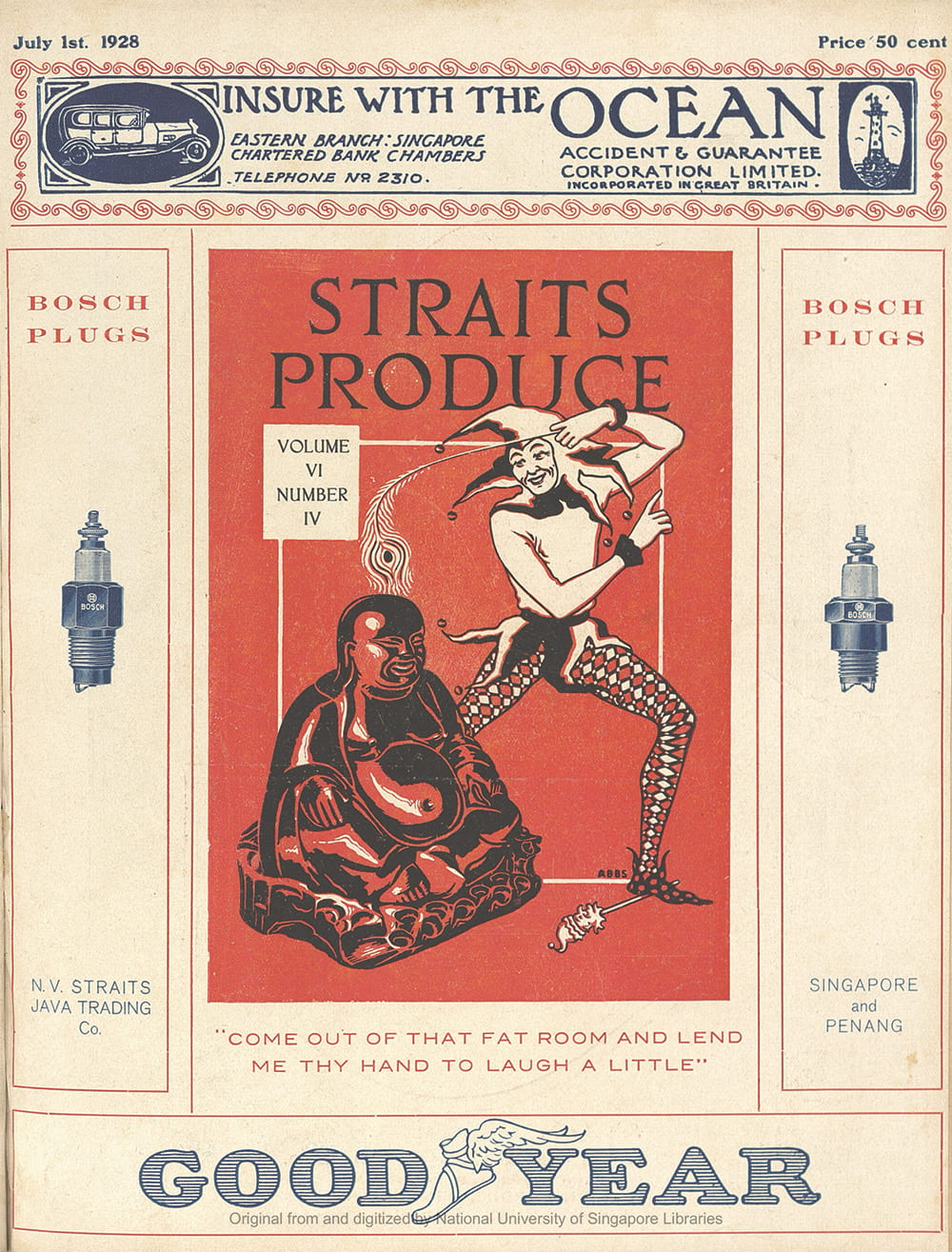
- July 1928 issue of the Straits Produce
- Categories: Satirical magazine
- First issue: 25 December 1868
- Final issue: Late 1930s
- Based in: Singapore
- Language: English

The Straits Produce was a satirical magazine distributed throughout the Straits Settlements. It sought to illustrate the lives of colonial rulers and settlers in Malaya and Singapore through comedic caricatures and sketches.

== History ==
The magazine was established to comment on the financial policies of then Governor of the Straits Settlements Harry Ord. Its inauguration issue was printed and published in Christmas 1868 by S. W. Augustin. The first iteration of the magazine had ten contributors. However, soon after the publication of the magazine's second issue, which was printed and published in Christmas 1870, the chief financial backers of the magazine pulled out, due to several comments made towards Ord that were deemed unacceptable.

The magazine was revived in 1893, with the third issue being printed and published in Christmas. By then, only two of the original contributors remained in Singapore. It was printed in Singapore. James Miller, a prominent businessman, contributed several cartoons to the later issues of this iteration of the magazine. The final issue of this iteration of the magazine was published in 1898.

The magazine was revived again in 1922, with a new issue being published on 1 April. The editors of the new iteration of the magazine were Roland Braddell and Denis Santry. The artists and authors of the magazine then included Gilbert E. Brooke, Andrew Caldecott, Charles Walter Hamilton Cochrane, H. B. Egmont Hake and William George Stirling. The final issues of the magazine were published in the mid-1930s.
