= Governor of Labuan =

- Style: His Excellency
- Residence: Victoria
- Inaugural holder: James Brooke
- Formation: 1848–1946
- Final holder: Shenton Thomas
- Abolished: 1946

The Governor of Labuan was the appointed head of the government of the Crown Colony of Labuan.

From 1848 to 1890, the governors were appointed by the British authorities in London. When the administration was taken over by the North Borneo Chartered Company in 1890, the company became responsible for the appointment of the governors until the Straits Settlements administration took over in 1906.

== List of governors appointed by the Crown ==
Name	From	To
James Brooke: William Napier (Lieutenant-Governor) (1848–1850); John Scott (Lieutenant-Governor) (1850–1856)	1848	1852
George Warren Edwardes	1856	1861
Thomas Fitzgerald Callaghan	1861	1866
Hugh Low (acting)	1866	1867
John Pope Hennessy	1867	1871
Henry Bulwer	1871	1875
Herbert Taylor Ussher	1875	1879
Charles Cameron Lees	1879	1881
Peter Leys (acting)	1881	1888
Arthur Shirley Hamilton	1888	1890

== List of governors appointed by the North Borneo Company ==
Flag of the governor of North Borneo (1890–1903).

Flag of the governor of North Borneo (1903–1906).

Name	From	To
Charles Creagh	1890	1895
Leicester Beaufort	1895	1899
Hugh Clifford	1900	1901
Ernest Birch	1901	1903
Edward Peregrine Gueritz	1904	1906

== List of governors appointed by the Straits Settlements ==
Flag of the governor of the Straits Settlements (1906–1946).

Name	From	To
John Anderson	1906	1911
Arthur Young	1911	1920
Laurence Guillemard	1920	1927
Hugh Clifford	1927	1930
Cecil Clementi	1930	1934
Shenton Thomas	1934	1941
Administration interrupted by the Japanese occupation
Shenton Thomas (resumed administration)	1945	1946

== Sources ==
- List of Labuan Governors on World Statesmen
