= Boustead Institute =

Coordinates: 1.2724°N 103.8416°E

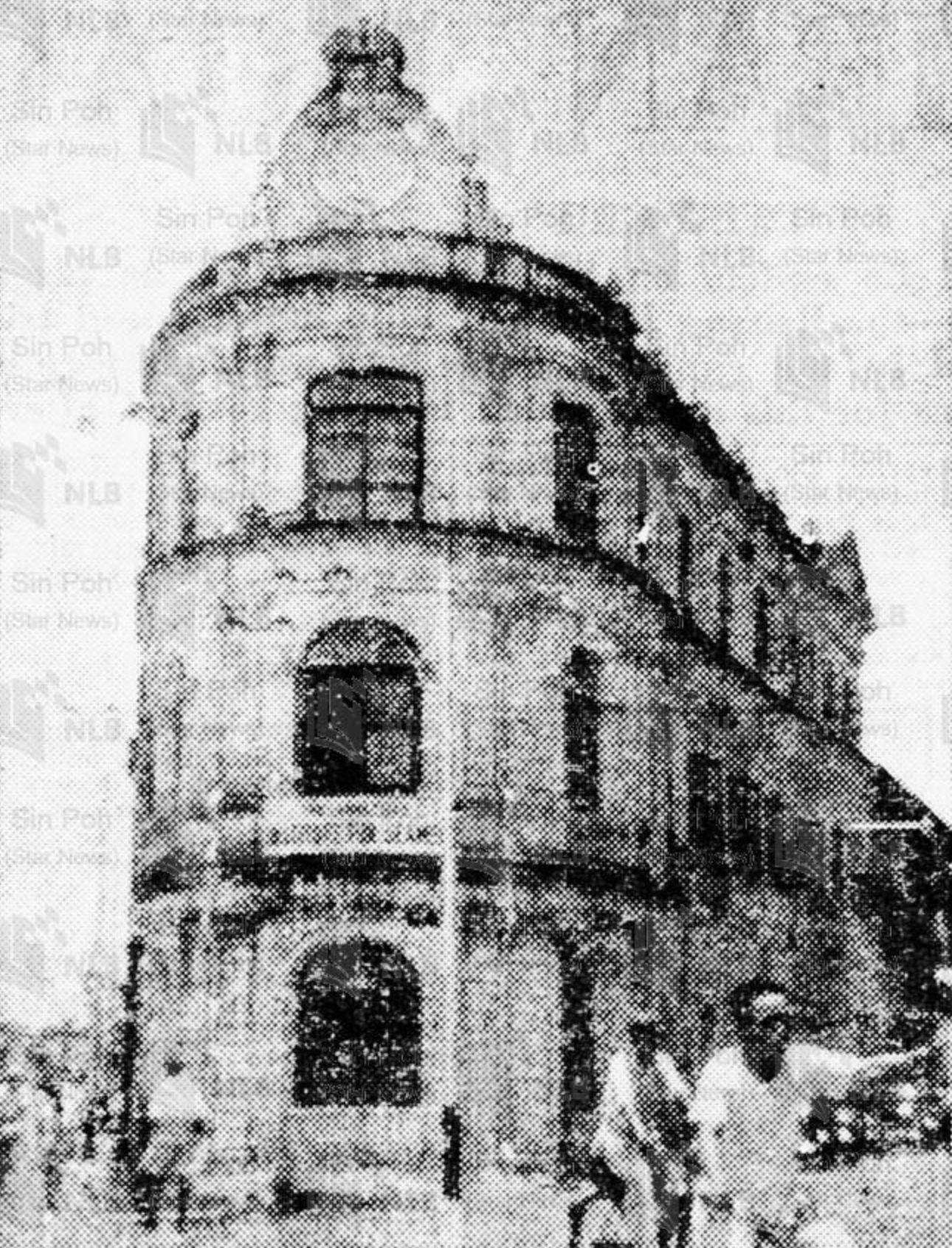
The building in 1951

Boustead Institute was a building located at the junction of Tanjong Pagar Road and Anson Road in Singapore which initially served as a hostel for seamen. It later housed the Toby's Paradise bar, and was demolished in the 1970s.

== History ==
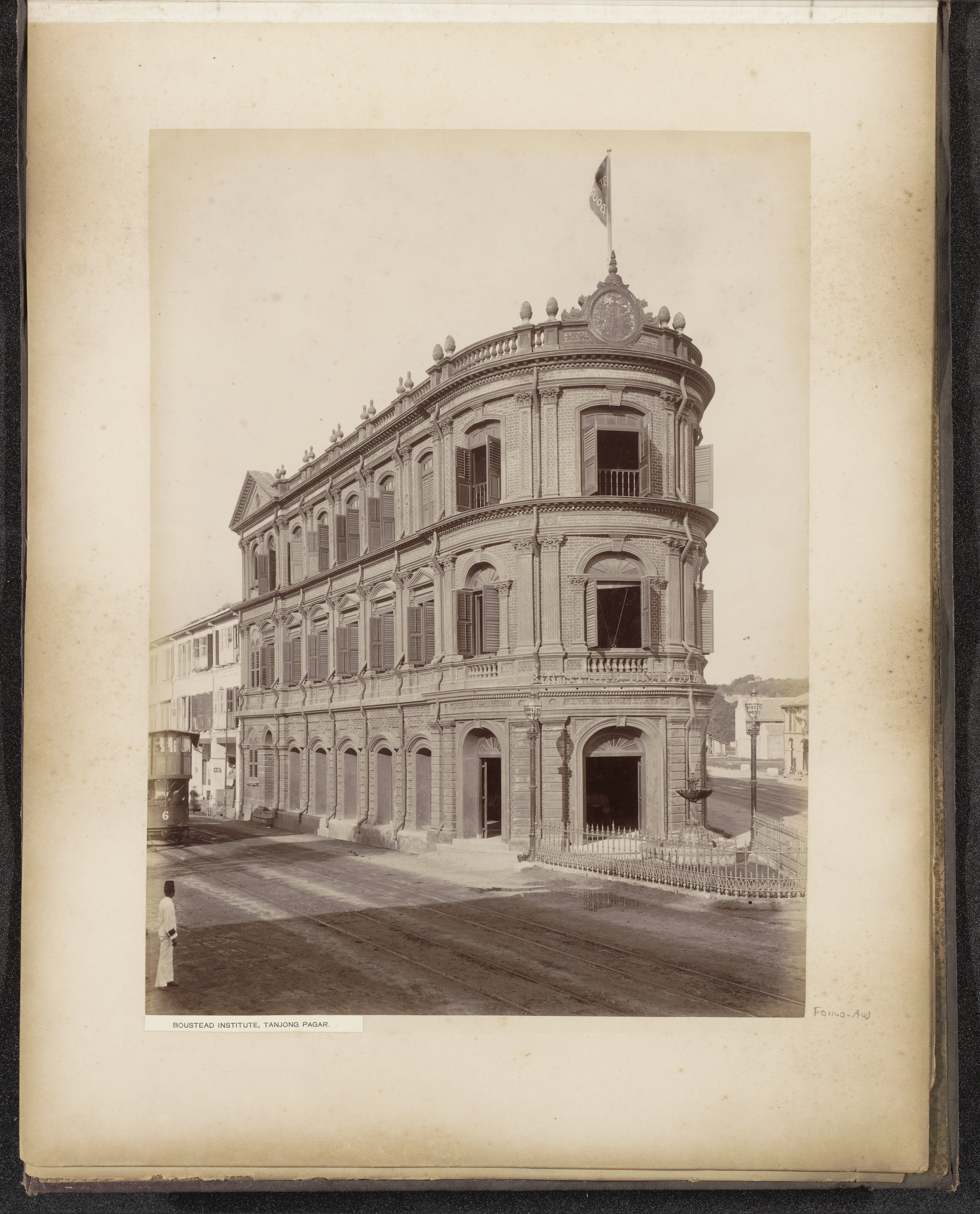
Boustead Institute before ca. 1905

The institute was completed in June 1892. The construction of the building was funded with the money wealthy businessman Edward Boustead bequeathed upon his death in 1888 to finance the construction of a building for the seamen. It was formally opened on 2 July by the governor of the Straits Settlements, Cecil Clementi Smith. The institute stood at the junction of Tanjong Pagar Road and Anson Road, and faced the Tanjong Pagar Police Station.

During the Japanese occupation of Singapore, the building was converted into the Harbour headquarters. By the end of the occupation, the building had been completely stripped. In 1946, the building was temporarily converted into a courthouse for minor war crimes. The War Crimes Court No. 2 was located on the institute's second floor while the War Crimes Court No. 7 was located on the institute's ground floor. The institute officially reopened on 1 May 1947. The building was renovated and redecorated in May 1951.

In 1958, the building was sold to Chan Wing Seng and his brother Chan Wing Fook. Following this, a bar, Toby, was established in the building. A year later, it became the Paradise bar. The building was demolished in the late 1970s to make way for port expansion works.
