= Macvey Napier =

Scottish solicitor, legal scholar and editor

- Born: Napier Macvey; 11 April 1776; Kirkintilloch
- Died: 11 February 1847 (aged 70); Edinburgh
- Education: University of Glasgow; University of Edinburgh
- Occupations: Writer to the Signet, editor

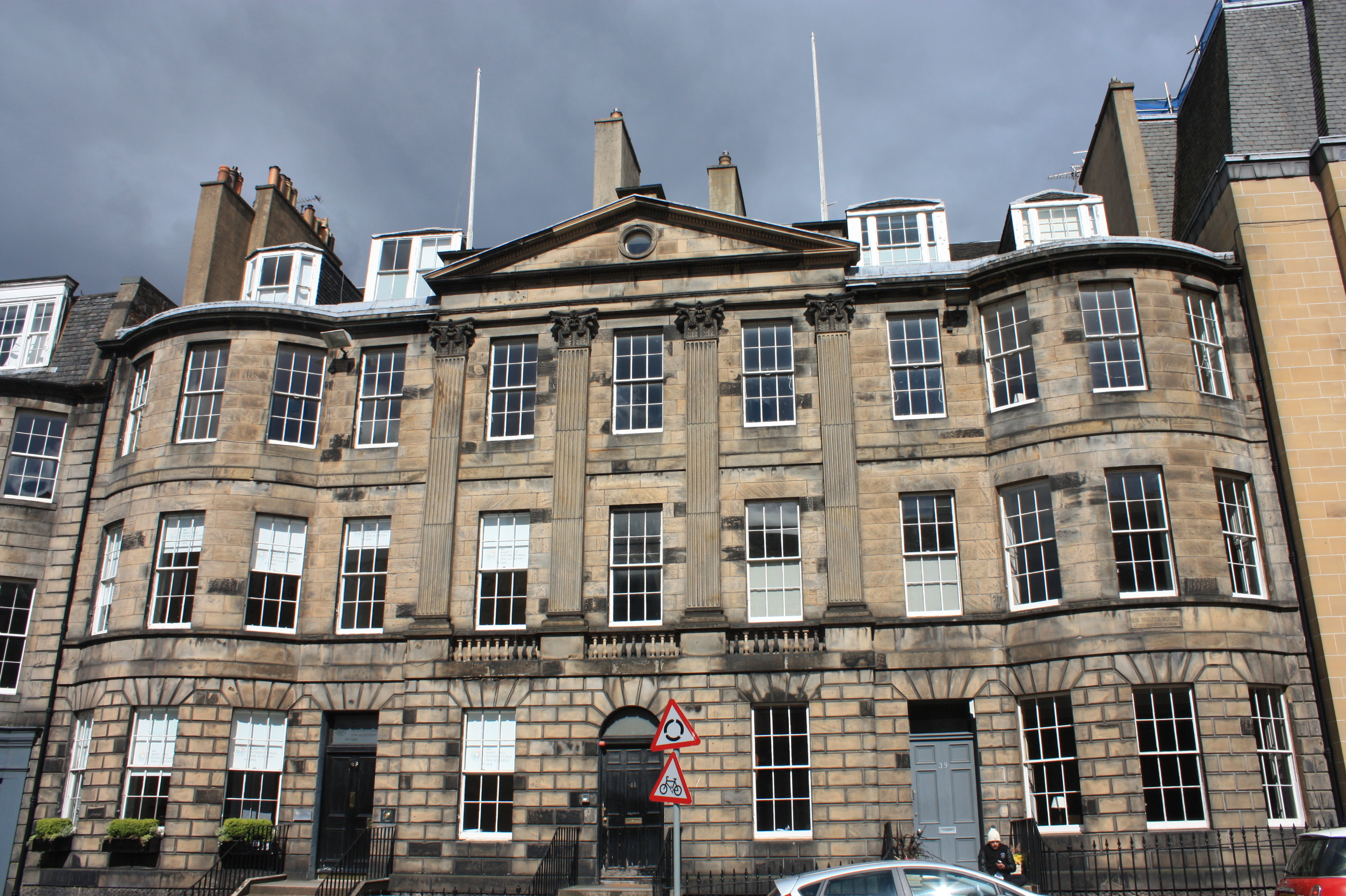
39 Castle Street (now known as North Castle Street), Edinburgh home to Macvey Napier

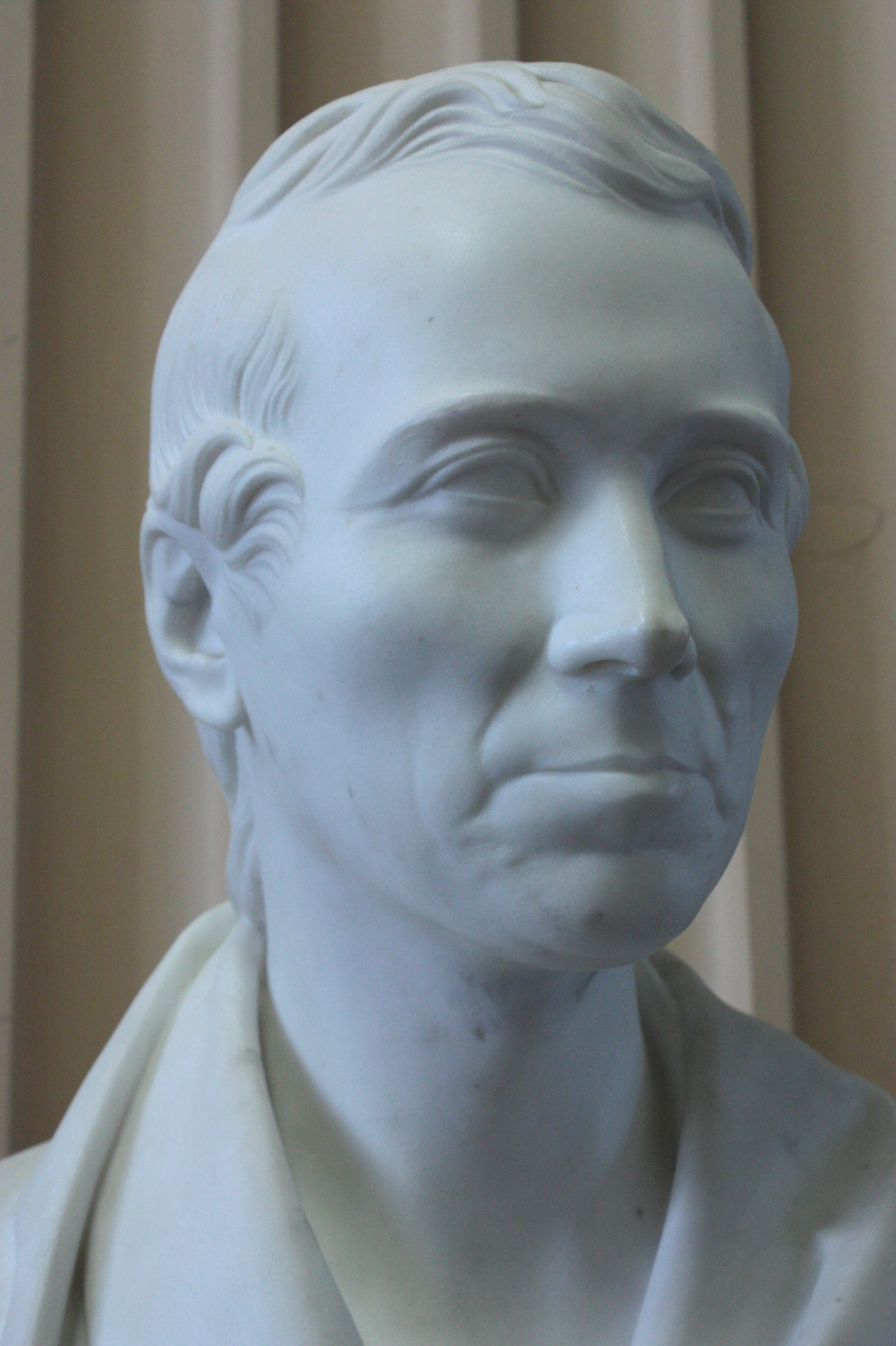
Macvey Napier by J P Slater

Macvey Napier (born Napier Macvey) FRSE FRS WS (11 April 1776 – 11 February 1847) was a Scottish solicitor, legal scholar, and an editor of the Encyclopædia Britannica. He was Professor of Conveyancing at the University of Edinburgh.

== Life ==
Macvey was born on 12 April 1776 in Kirkintilloch the son of John Macvey a merchant in the town. His mother's maiden name was Napier.

He studied law first at the University of Glasgow then at the University of Edinburgh before befriending the publisher Archibald Constable in 1798. Constable later asked Napier to write for the Edinburgh Review with articles beginning from 1805 and became an editor in 1814. He in turn recruited several eminent authorities to write in the 6th edition and its supplement, as well as in the 7th edition of the Britannica. He was editor of the Review from 1829.

From 1805 to 1837 he acted as Librarian to the Signet Library, the law library for Edinburgh solicitors.

From 1816 to 1824 he lectured in legal conveyancing, and in 1825 became a professor of conveyancing at the University of Edinburgh.

He was inducted into the Royal Society of London for the Improvement of Natural Knowledge in 1817 In 1812 he was elected a Fellow of the Royal Society of Edinburgh.

In 1817 he had a public fall out with Professor John Wilson in a series of letters published in Blackwood's Magazine under the title of Hypocrisy Unveiled.

In 1829 he replaced Francis Jeffrey as principal editor of The Edinburgh Review.

In the 1830s he is listed as living and operating from 39 Castle Street in Edinburgh's New Town, a 3-storey townhouse within a four-storey and attic block. It was previously the home of Sir Walter Scott.

He died in Edinburgh on 11 February 1847, and is buried in St John's Episcopal Churchyard at the east end of Princes Street.

== Family ==
Napier married Catharine Skene (d.1828) in 1797 and they had seven sons and three daughters. One son, Macvey, edited his father's papers for publication; Alexander became vicar of Holkham, Norfolk; John died in the West Indies; David Skene was a merchant in Singapore and gave George Coleman his first important commission to build a large Palladian residence in 1826; and William went to Singapore as a lawyer in 1833.

== Works ==
- Napier, Macvey (October 1837). "Review of The Tribute". Edinburgh Review. 66: 103–110.
- Napier, Macvey (1838). Memoir of Sir John Leslie in 7th edition of the Encyclopædia Britannica. A. and C. Black.
- Napier, Macvey (1853). Lord Bacon and Sir Walter Raleigh. Macmillan and co.
- Selections from the correspondence of the late Macvey Napier, esq.; edited by his son, Mackey Napier. Macmillan and Co. 1879.

== See also ==
- Principal Clerk of Session and Justiciary
