= Denis Santry =

Irish architect and cartoonist (1879–1960)

- Born: 14 May 1879; Cork, Ireland
- Died: 14 April 1960 (aged 80); Durban, South Africa
- Education: Royal College of Art
- Occupations: architect, cartoonist
- Spouse: Madeline Hegarty (m. 1904)
- Practice: Tully & Waters; Swan & Maclaren
- Buildings: Sultan Mosque; The Cenotaph; Maritime Building; Telok Ayer Chinese Methodist Church

Denis Santry (14 May 1879 – 14 April 1960) was an Irish architect and cartoonist. He was a pioneer of animated cartoons in South Africa and the architect of the several prominent structures in Singapore, including the Sultan Mosque and The Cenotaph.

== Early life and education ==
Santry was born in Cork, Ireland on 14 May 1879 to Denis Santry Sr., a carpenter and joiner. He studied at the Cork Municipal School of Art from 1894 to 1896 after serving an apprenticeship as a cabinetmaker. In 1895, he also studied at the Crawford School of Art. In 1897, he was articled to architect James Finbarre McMullen. From 1897 to 1898, he studied at the Royal College of Art in London under a Lane scholarship. While he was at the college, he won the Queen's prize for freehand drawing. After graduating, he returned to McMullen's office and worked there for the next two years.

== Career ==
Santry came to South Africa at the end of 1901 due to ill health. He settled in Cape Town and was employed at Tully & Waters, an architectural firm, from 1901 to 1902. He then spent a year working for architect William Patrick Henry Black. In 1903, his cartoons began to appear in local newspapers and magazines, including the South African Review. He used the pseudonym 'Adam' in his cartoons. He continued to work as an architect until 1910 when he began working as a cartoonist, as well as a metalworker, sculptor and filmmaker. He then moved to Johannesburg and was employed at the Sunday Times and The Rand Daily Mail as a cartoonist. During World War I, his cartoons were reproduced in several other countries. He became a pioneer of animated cartoons in South Africa. He was a member of the Royal Society of Arts and a council member of the South African Society of Artists.

Santry came to Singapore in 1918 and joined architectural firm Swan & Maclaren as a partner. While in Singapore, he served as the architect of several prominent buildings and monuments, including the Sultan Mosque, The Cenotaph, the Maritime Building, the Hongkong and Shanghai Bank Building and the Telok Ayer Chinese Methodist Church. He served as the first president of the St. Patrick's Society Singapore, the first president of the Singapore Amateur Boxing Association, the chairman of the Singapore Art Club, a member of the board of control of the Victoria Theatre and Concert Hall, a member of the Censorship Appeal Board and the vice-president of the Straits Settlements Association. He was also a frequent contributor to the Straits Produce, a satirical magazine. He helped to found the Singapore Society of Architects and the Institute of Architects of Malaya and was the founder and the chairman of the Singapore Musical Society. He retired to England in March 1934.

Santry returned to South Africa in 1940. Following the end of World War II, he resumed his practice as a result of lost income caused by the Japanese occupation of Malaya. In 1950, he became a member of the Institute of South African Architects. He designed several private houses in Hillcrest, KwaZulu-Natal.

== Personal life and death ==
Santry married Madeline Hegarty in 1904. From 1910 to 1918, he lived in Kleine Schuur on Rhodes Avenue in Johannesburg. The house was designed by prominent architect Herbert Baker. He died in Durban, South Africa on 14 April 1960.
