= John Scott (governor) =

British colonial official

Sir John Scott KCMG (1814 – 29 June 1898) was a British colonial official who held high office in Labuan and Natal before serving as Governor of British Guiana from 1868 to 1873.

== Early life ==
John Scott was born in Carlisle in 1814.

== Career ==
Scott served as Lieutenant-Governor of Labuan from 1850 to 1856 and of the Colony of Natal from 1856 to 1865. Scottburgh in Natal was named in his honour. He was then Secretary to the North American Boundary Commission, before in 1868 he was appointed to succeed Sir Francis Hincks as Governor and Commander-in-Chief of British Guiana, taking up residence in Georgetown on 25 January 1869. It was hoped that his previous experience would help with the speedy settlement of a long-standing boundary dispute with Venezuela.

One of the challenges Scott faced in Guiana was the question of East Indian immigration, which he favoured, and he controversially used his casting vote to secure an Immigration Bill to secure it.

Scott retired from his post in British Guiana in 1873, departing on 26 June, and was appointed a Knight Commander of the Order of St Michael and St George. The Georgetown Gazette said he was an English gentleman, plain and simple in his tastes, kind to the last degree, with a strong love of having his own way on everything. He returned to England, where he and his wife settled in Kensington Park Gardens. In 1882 they were living there with three female servants and a footman.

== Private life ==
In 1850, Scott married Amelia Emma Catherine, the youngest daughter of William Cook, deceased, formerly of Clay Hill, Enfield, Middlesex. She died in Kensington in 1882.

Scott died a widower on 29 June 1898 at South Home, Kennal Road, Chislehurst, Kent.

== Notes ==
Government offices
Preceded by Sir Francis Hincks	Governor of British Guiana; 1868–1876	Succeeded by James Robert Longden
