= Lady Helen Ibrahim =

Sultanah of Johor from 1930 to 1938

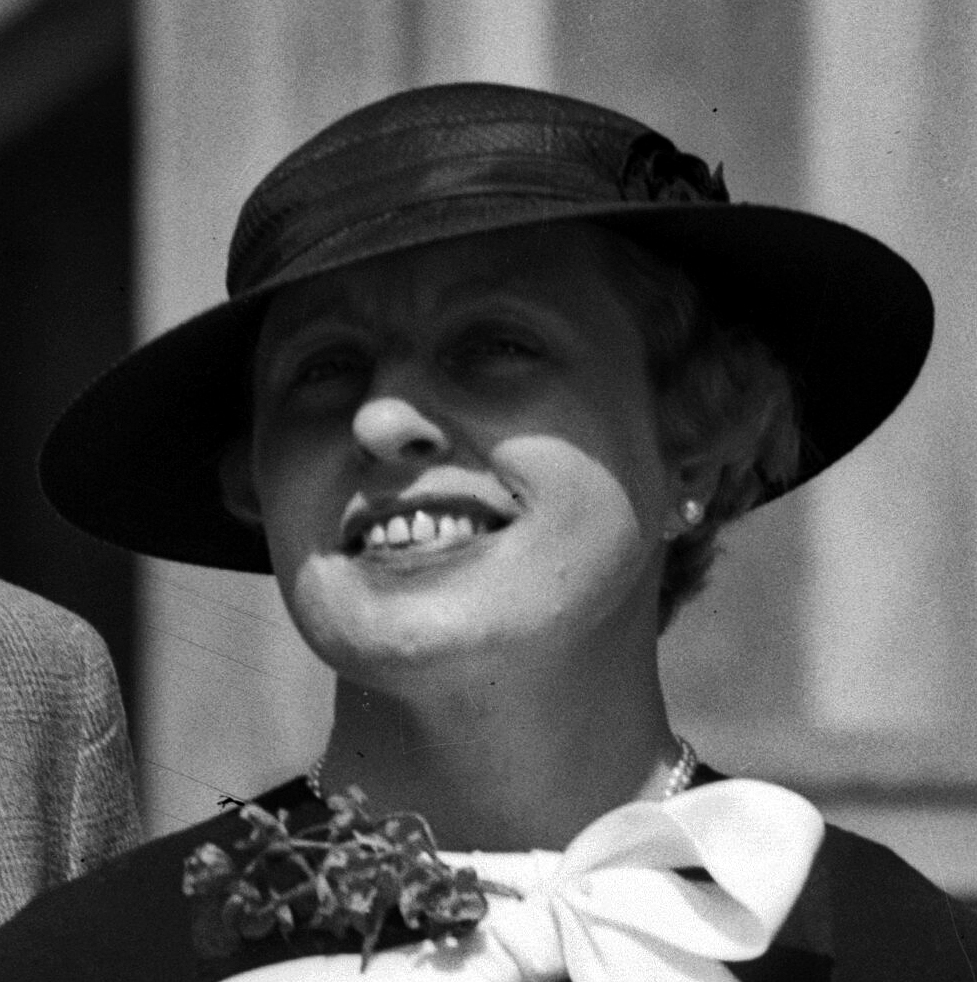
- Sultanah Helen Ibrahim in 1934
- Born: Helen Bartholomew; 21 December 1899; 10 Belgrave Street, Glasgow, Scotland
- Died: 13 August 1977 (aged 77); Homelands Nursing Home, Cowfold Horsham, Sussex, England, United Kingdom
- Other names: Helen Bartholomew Wilson (former); Helen binti Abdullah (former); Sultanah Helen Ibrahim (former)
- Citizenship: British
- Known for: Former Sultanah and ex-wife of Sultan Ibrahim of Johor
- Spouses: William Brockie Wilson (m. 1914; div. 1925) Ibrahim of Johor (m. 1930; div. 1938)
- Awards: King George V Silver Jubilee Medal (1935); King George VI Coronation Medal (1937)
- Her Highness Sultanah Helen Ibrahim 3rd wife of Sultan Ibrahim of Johor

Sultanah of Johor
- Tenure: 15 October 1930 – 30 March 1938
- Coronation: 15 October 1930
- Predecessor: Sultanah Rogayah
- Successor: Sultanah Fawzia
- House: Temenggong (by marriage)

Lady Helen Ibrahim (née Bartholomew; 21 December 1899 – 13 August 1977) was the third Sultanah of Johor while married to Sultan Sir Ibrahim Iskandar Al-Masyhur ibni Almarhum Sultan Sir Abu Bakar, the 22nd Sultan of Johor.

== Early life ==
Born in Glasgow, Scotland on 21 December 1899 and Scottish by birth, she was the daughter of a master saw-maker from Stirlingshire.

Her first marriage was to William Brockie Wilson, a Malayan-born Scot, they wed in Singapore on 14 March 1914. He was a physician by training. Bartholomew first met Sultan Ibrahim when Wilson became the Sultan's physician. Helen had followed her husband all the way from Scotland to then British Malaya. They later divorced in 1925.

== Marriage to the Sultan ==
Sultan Ibrahim was a known Anglophile and loved to spend his time travelling around Europe, especially to the United Kingdom. The Sultan enrolled his sons, by his two Malay wives, to be educated in Britain. It was during this time he renewed his acquaintance with the widow and asked her to keep an eye on his boys. Sultan Ibrahim visited Bartholomew and the boys from time to time and Bartholomew's relationship with the boys was very close.

Sultan Ibrahim and Bartholomew were married in a Surrey mosque in October 1930 and Bartholomew then became known as Her Highness Sultanah Helen Ibrahim.

In 1935, her picture with Sultan Ibrahim was put on a Johor postage stamp as a gift to her from the Sultan on their fifth wedding anniversary.

Throughout the reign as Sultanah of Johor, Sultanah Helen was awarded the Darjah Kerabat Johor Yang Amat DiHormati (D.K.) and Johor Darjah Seri Paduka Mahkota Johor (S.P.M.J.) in Johor. Additionally, she was awarded with King George V Silver Jubilee Medal (1935) and King George VI Coronation Medal (1937). The couple divorced on 30 March 1938. Even after the divorce, the Sultan reputedly gave her an emerald on her birthday and a diamond on their wedding anniversary.

== Later life and death ==
Lady Helen briefly returned to Scotland and lived in Cambuslang and would later move to London. She was last seen at the Sauchiehall Street in Glasgow in the 1960s, where she was seen stepping out from a Rolls-Royce car, after that, not further information is known about her later life. Later records shown that Lady Helen had since died on 13 August 1977 at age 77 at the Homelands Nursing Home, Cowfold, Sussex, England.

== Sources ==
- Mads Lange fra Bali: Og Hans Efterslaegt Sultanerne af Johor, Paul Andresen, Odense Universitetsforlag, 1992, ISBN 87-7492-851-1
- Malaya: The Malayan Union Experiment, 1942-1948, by A. J. Stockwell, University of London Institute of Commonwealth Studies, published by HMSO, 1995
