= Ibrahim of Johor =

Sultan of Johor (r. 1895–1959)

Ibrahim GCMG GBE إبراهيم
- Al-Masyhur (The Famous)
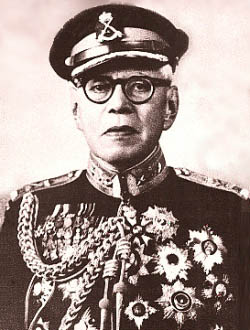
- Portrait of Sultan Ibrahim in the 1950s

Sultan of Johor
- Reign: 7 September 1895 – 8 May 1959
- Coronation: 2 November 1895
- Predecessor: Abu Bakar
- Successor: Ismail
- Chief Ministers: See list: Ja'afar Muhammad Mohamed Mahbob Abdullah Ja'afar Mustapha Ja'afar Abdul Hamid Yusof Ungku Abdul Aziz Ungku Abdul Majid Onn Ja'afar Syed Abdul Kadir Mohamed Wan Idris Wan Ibrahim

Tunku Mahkota of Johor
- Reign: 23 May 1891 – 4 June 1895
- Born: 17 September 1873; Istana Bidadari, Serangoon, Singapore, Straits Settlements
- Died: 8 May 1959 (aged 85); Grosvenor House Hotel, London, United Kingdom
- Burial: 6 June 1959; Mahmoodiah Royal Mausoleum, Johor Bahru, Johor
- Spouse: Sultanah Ungku Maimunah binti Ungku Abdul Majid; Sultanah Rogayah; Enche' Hasnah binti Dato' Jaafar; Ungku Intan binti Ungku Ahmad; Sultanah Helen binti Abdullah (née Helen Bartholomew Wilson); Sultanah Fawzia binti Abdullah (née Marcella Mendl)
- Issue: Tunku Muhammad Khalid (born and died in August 1893); Tunku Ismail; Tunku Haris Abu Bakar; Tunku Ahmad; Tunku Miriam
Names
- Daeng Ibrahim ibni Maharaja Sir Abu Bakar
Regnal name
- Sultan Sir Ibrahim ibni Almarhum Sultan Sir Abu Bakar Al-Khalil Ibrahim Shah
- House: Temenggong
- Father: Sultan Abu Bakar Ibni Al-Marhum Dato' Temenggong Sri Maharaja Tun Daeng Ibrahim
- Mother: Inche Besar Zubaidah binti Abdullah (née Cecilia Catharina Lange)
- Religion: Sunni Islam

Ibrahim Al-Masyhur ibni Almarhum Sultan Abu Bakar Al-Khalil Ibrahim Shah (Jawi: سلطان سر إبراهيم المشهور ابن المرحوم سلطان أبو بكر الخليل إبراهيم شاه; 17 September 1873 – 8 May 1959) was a Malaysian sultan and the 2nd modern sultan of Johor. He was considered "fabulously wealthy."

An Anglophile, Ibrahim maintained close ties with the British crown and frequently leveraged his personal relationships with reigning monarchs to advocate for Johor's autonomy and resist the expansionist ambitions of the British Colonial Office. However, he became highly unpopular later in his native land for his opposition to Malayan independence. This led him to spend most of his time away from Johor, traveling extensively in Europe, particularly to Britain.

== Early life ==
Wan Ibrahim was born 17 September 1873 in the Istana Bidadari, Singapore, and received his education at a boarding school in England during his formative years. He was appointed a second lieutenant of the Johor Military Forces (JMF) during his teenage years and was formally installed as the first Tunku Mahkota of Johor on 23 May 1891 and was brought to Europe by his father where he was introduced to the European royal families. During his term as the Tunku Mahkota, Tunku Ibrahim occasionally acted as the state's regent and was delegated a few state duties whenever the Sultan was travelling overseas. In his free time, Tunku Ibrahim spent most of his time in hunting and horseracing.

Tunku Ibrahim acted as one of the three signatories when Sultan Abu Bakar promogulated the Johor State Constitution in April 1895. The following month, Tunku Ibrahim accompanied Abu Bakar to London, who had the intent of seeking further negotiations with the Colonial Office on state affairs. Abu Bakar was by then very ill when he reached England, and Tunku Ibrahim spent much of his time by his father's bedside before Abu Bakar died the following month.

== Sultan of Johor ==
=== Early years (1895–1914) ===
Tunku Ibrahim was proclaimed as the Sultan of Johor on the day of Abu Bakar's burial on 7 September 1895, while his one-year-old son, Tunku Ismail was proclaimed as his heir-apparent. A formal coronation ceremony took place on 2 November 1895. He took over the state government the following year, and one of his first reports was the financial difficulties which the state was facing. Many of his employees complained of delays in receiving their salaries; which were often paid in instalments. Sultan Ibrahim then took charge of closely supervising the state treasury, and personally witnessed the payment of the state's employees during payment day. In the same year, he also took on the task of appointing the committee members of the Johor Gambier and Pepper Society (also known as Kongkek in Malay). Sultan Ibrahim was inexperienced in public administration skills and heavily relied on his private secretary, Dato Amar DiRaja Abdul Rahman bin Andak on advice and assistance in running the affairs of the state.

The Resident General of the Federated Malay States, Frank Swettenham proposed to Sultan Ibrahim in November 1899 the construction of a railway line into Johor, in conjunction with his plan for the North-South Main Trunk Railway down the Malay Peninsula. Sultan Ibrahim welcomed Swettenham's plan but was weary of British influence in Johor and insisted on financing the construction of the railway line himself. Swettenham was comfortable with Sultan Ibrahim's prospect of financing the railway line using the state's revenue, and submitted his proposals to the Colonial Office in England. The proposals drew scepticism from the Secretary of State for the Colonies, Joseph Chamberlain, who was aware of Johor's financial difficulties and withheld decision. Sultan Ibrahim then sent his adviser Abdul Rahman Andak the following May to London to negotiate with the Colonial Office, and in April 1901, Sultan Ibrahim made a year-long trip to London to seek private English financiers to fund the construction of the railway line and negotiated with the Colonial Office for a railway loan. He managed to obtain a loan for the construction of the railway and the Johor Railway Convention was signed in July 1904 by his adviser, Abdul Rahman Andak, that gave provisions for an extension of the Malayan railway line to be extended into Johor.

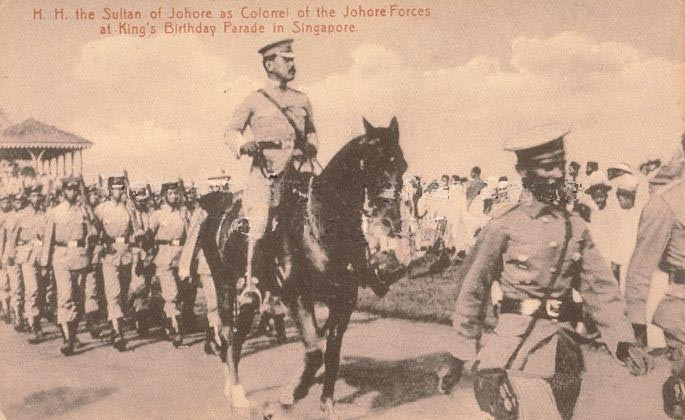
Sultan Ibrahim leading as Colonel of the Johor Military Forces at King's Birthday Parade of George V in Singapore, c. 1920

Sultan Ibrahim returned to Johor the following year, and expanded the state's military forces, JMF. He instituted the Johor Volunteer Forces, which consisted of young Malay boys and served as the state's reservist soldiers. In 1906, he granted land concessions to English capitalists and financiers for development purposes. This drew the concern of the Straits Governor, Sir John Anderson, who was not very favourable with Sultan Ibrahim's intents to detach Johor's economic dependence from Singapore. He successfully pressured Sultan Ibrahim to dispense with the services of Abdul Rahman Andak as well as ceding the administrative powers of the railway line to the colonial government the following year after reports of the state's troubled finances were revealed.

Sultan Ibrahim was also facing political challenges from the British colonial government, who were ostensibly unhappy about his negligence in his state affairs and were seeking to extend greater political influence into the state. The Colonial Secretary of the Straits Settlements, Victor Bruce, Lord Elgin had met Sultan Ibrahim in 1906 and advised him to administer the state in favour of British interests and to cut down on his overseas travels to Europe. Sultan Ibrahim was adamant about Elgin's advice and was indignant to accept British advice, and was warned two years later by Lord Elgin on the possibility of the British enacting constitutional changes to the state administration. In 1910, Sultan Ibrahim accepted a British adviser for Johor after immense pressure from the colonial government. The British were extremely unhappy with the condition of Johor's finances, which was depleted as a result of Sultan Ibrahim's extensive overseas travels. The British-Resident of Negeri Sembilan, Douglas Graham Campbell was appointed as the first adviser of Johor.

Relations between Sultan Ibrahim and Campbell were excellent within Campbell's first year as an adviser, and Sultan Ibrahim gave him support to improve the state administrative system. However, a tenacious relationship was develop as Campbell proposed numerous administrative reforms which were declined by the Sultan. A political scandal erupted in 1912 after Campbell publicly revealed malpractices in the Johor Bahru Prison. Campbell was particularly unhappy with the way the prisoners were incarcated and lobbied to the British authorities to take charge of the administrative affairs of the prison which caused protest from the Sultan. Grievances between the Sultan's administration and the colonial government over the administrative control of the state railway remained unabated during this period, and the Menteri Besar of Johor, Dato' Abdullah bin Jaafar was delegated to handle these matters.

Shortly after his fallout with Campbell, Sultan Ibrahim implemented a state executive council (Malay: Masyurat Kerja) to oversee the administration of state agricultural and mining activities. The Sultan distanced himself from the Campbell and the state's legal adviser, Michael Whitley and took administrative matters into his own hands. This incited worry and unhappiness in Campbell and Whitley, and they submitted a memorandum to the Governor of the Straits Settlements, Sir Arthur Henderson Young to appeal for greater British administrative control over the state. Young gave provisions to Campbell with the power similar to a British Resident-General from other states, but kept the title of "General Adviser" to show protocol deference to the Sultan. Sultan Ibrahim was unhappy with the new proposals as the British adviser would have more direct control over the state affairs, but Young assured the Sultan that he would be available for consultation in the event that they had differing opinions. A treaty was signed on 12 May 1914, which formalised the powers of the state's General Adviser.

=== World War I and Interwar years (1914–1941) ===
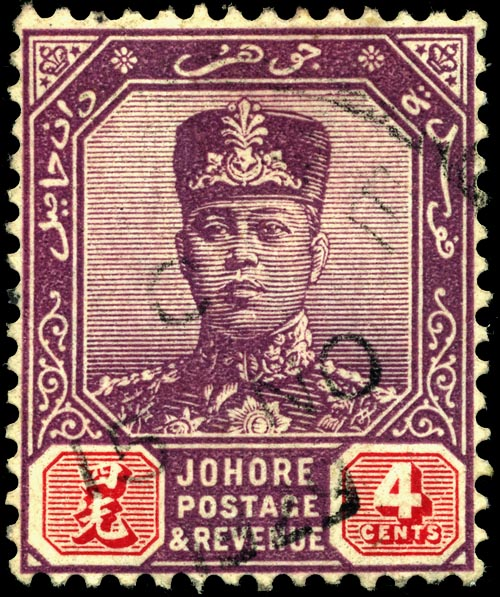
Sultan Ibrahim as depicted on a postage stamp of 1921.

The state economy experienced a budget surplus as a result of an increase in rubber prices for the rest of the 1910s. Campbell served as its General Adviser until his death in June 1918, and between June 1918 until December 1920, five General Advisers were appointed in succession, each of whom only took office for a few months. As the colonial government lacked decisiveness in the state administration, Sultan Ibrahim attempted to extend his influence in the state administration. Hayes Marriot was appointed as the state's new General Adviser in December 1920 and reorganised the state administration.

Sultan Ibrahim took on the role of a ceremonial monarch from the 1920s onwards, and his duties were largely limited to gracing various opening ceremonies around Johor. He occasionally expressed his views on the state administration and economic developments whenever he had grievances, which the British colonial government often took into account as a result of his political influence in the state. He began to take time off to travel abroad from 1928, after he began to suffer from chronic gout and myocardial degeneration. He would often visit London and frequented the Colonial Office whenever he had grievances with the state administration. As a result of his frequent complaints of maladministration of state affairs by the local British government, Sultan Ibrahim's relations with each General Adviser became strained. (Note: Except for one, Richard Olaf Winstedt, who served as Johor's Acting General Adviser from 1931–1933. Sultan Ibrahim had high regards for Winstedt, and requested for Winstedt to continue to serve as the Johor's General Adviser. Winstedt served in that capacity until 1935.) Sir Cecil Clementi, who served as the governor of the Straits Settlements as well as the high commissioner of the Malay States from 1930 to 1934, remarked in December 1932 that Sultan Ibrahim was too independent in state affairs and proposed to the Sultan that he should approach Clementi in future under the capacity of the high commissioner instead of the Straits Governor. Clementi's proposals apparently angered the Sultan, who boycotted the Durbar in February 1934.

Sultan Ibrahim was a close friend of Frank Buck and often assisted Buck in his animal collecting endeavours.

Early Malay nationalism took root in Johor during the 1920s as a Malay aristocrat, Onn Jaafar, whom the Sultan had treated as an adopted son, became a journalist and wrote articles on the welfare of the Malays. Some of Onn's articles were critical of Sultan Ibrahim's policies, which strained their personal relations. Sultan Ibrahim expelled Onn from Johor after he published an article in the Sunday Mirror, a Singapore-based English tabloid and criticised the Sultan's poor treatment of the Johor Military Forces personnel and the welfare of the Orang Asli. Onn became very popular after he continued to cover issues on Malay grievances, and Sultan Ibrahim invited Onn to return to Johor in 1936. Sultan Ibrahim became an active patron of the state's forestry department around 1930, and encouraged the state forestry department to designate some of the remaining virgin forests in the state as nature reserves, as Johor had gone through a reduction in timber supplies due to extensive logging before. Nature reserves covered about 15 per cent of the state's land area by 1934, mainly in the northern regions of the state.

Sultan Ibrahim's relations with Clementi's successor, Sir Shenton Thomas did not fare well as Thomas attempted to form a centralised Malayan Union by bringing Johor and the other Unfederated Malay States under the direct authority of the Straits Governor. As the Second World War broke out in 1939, Thomas introduced the Pan-Malayan war tax scheme to fund for Britain's war efforts. Sultan Ibrahim's rejected the proposals, and made a £250,000 cash gift to George VI of the United Kingdom on his 44th birthday in 1939 during his trip to Europe in 1939. From 1934 to 1940 the Sultan's name was associated with that of the cabaret dancer Cissie Hill.

=== Japanese Occupation (1941–1945) ===
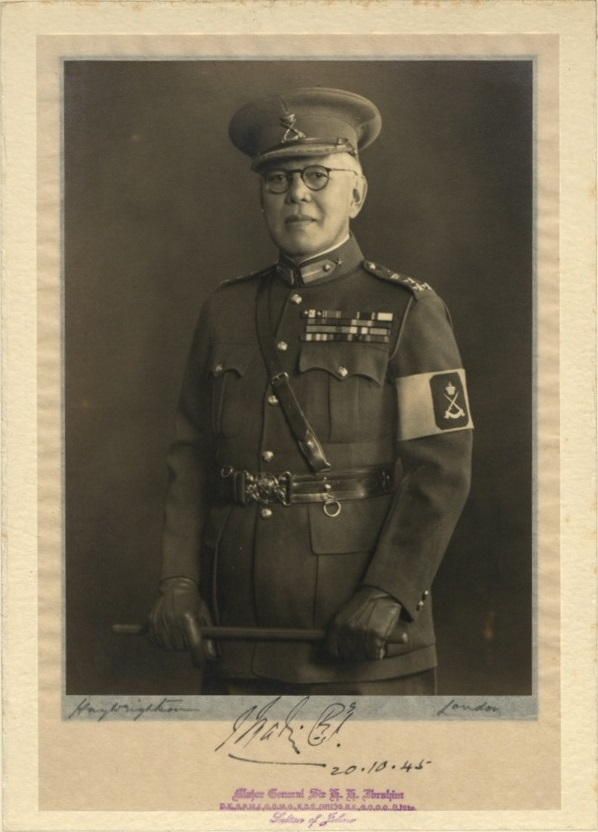
Sultan Ibrahim in 20 October 1945

Sultan Ibrahim became a personal friend of Yoshichika Tokugawa during the 1920s, a member of the Tokugawa clan whose ancestors included the shoguns who ruled Japan from the 16th to the 19th centuries. When the Japanese invaded Malaya, Tokugawa accompanied General Yamashita Tomoyuki's troops and was warmly received by Sultan Ibrahim when they reached Johor Bahru at the end of January 1942. Yamashita and his officers then stationed themselves at the Sultan's residence, the Istana Bukit Serene and the state secretariat building, the Sultan Ibrahim Building to plan for the invasion of Singapore.

The Japanese established a military government in February, shortly after they settled down in Malaya.Tokugawa was appointed as its political adviser – due in part to his relationship to the Sultan of Johor. Relations between the military government and the monarchy were initially cordial throughout the Japanese occupation, and Tokugawa briefly envisioned a plan for a united Malay Sultanate over the Malay Peninsula (including Pattani) with Sultan Ibrahim as its figurehead. However, as the Japanese began to experience economic difficulties and military defeats in the Pacific War from 1943 onwards, these plans were dropped and the military government channelled its efforts towards state agriculture. The Japanese continued the British policy of appointing a state adviser in Johor, and Sultan Ibrahim spent most of his time doing leisure activities.

Sultan Ibrahim, on his part, became resentful of the Japanese military government during the later part of the occupation. The Japanese gave orders to the Malay Sultans to contribute an annual stipend of $10,000 to support the Japanese war efforts, and public speeches which the rulers made were drafted by the propaganda department. In particular, Sultan Ibrahim was once publicly criticised, for leaning on his walking stick before Japanese officers. Shortly before the Japanese surrendered in 1945, Sultan Ibrahim was expelled from his residence at the Istana Bukit Serene and was forced to reside at the Istana Pasir Pelangi, the crown prince's palace.

=== Malay nationalism (1946–1948) ===
The British Military Administration set to task of reviving pre-war plans for centralised control over the Malay states within days after British Allied forces landed in Singapore on 5 September 1945. A former Malayan Civil Service legal officer, H.C. Willan, was ordered to interview the Malay rulers and Willan approached Sultan Ibrahim on 8 September. Sultan Ibrahim was living at the Istana Pasir Pelangi with his Romanian wife, and reportedly warmed up to Willan when he first saw him. During the interview with Willan, Sultan Ibrahim spoke bitterly of his experiences during the Japanese occupation, and offered to serve under the British Military Administration. The Sultan asked Willan's permission to fly the Union Jack on his car to attend the surrender ceremony on 12 September, and the British military government granted his requests.

Willan made further interviews with other Malay rulers over the next few days, and made assessments of the political situation in each state. His studies were forwarded to the military administration, and Sir Harold MacMichael, the former high commissioner of Palestine was empowered to sign official treaties with the Malay rulers over the Malayan Union proposal. MacMichael made several visits to the Malay rulers, beginning with Sultan Ibrahim in October 1945. The Sultan quickly consented to MacMichael's proposal, which was motivated by his strong desire to visit England at the end of the year. MacMichael paid further visits to other Malay rulers over the proposal, and sought their consent on it. Many Malay rulers expressed strong reluctance to signing the treaties with MacMichael, partly because they feared losing their royal status and the prospect of their states falling under Thai political influence.

The treaties provided that United Kingdom had full administrative powers over the Malay states except in areas pertaining to Islamic customs. The Malays strongly protested the treaties, as the treaties restricted the spiritual and moral authority of the Malay rulers, which the Malays held in high regard. Communal tensions between the Malays and Chinese were high, and the prospect of granting citizenship to non-Malays was deemed unacceptable to the Malays. In particular, politicians in Johor were extremely unhappy with the willingness of Sultan Ibrahim to sign the treaties with MacMichael, and voiced that the Sultan Ibrahim had violated the Johor State Constitution which explicitly forbade any foreign powers to assume legitimate control over the state. In early February 1946, seven political dissidents led by Awang bin Hassan organised a rally to protest against the Sultan's decision to sign the treaties, and Onn Jaafar, who was then serving as a district officer in Batu Pahat, was invited to attend the rally.

The rally was held on 1 February 1946 at the Sultan Abu Bakar State Mosque, and protesters shouted nationalistic slogans and called for the dethronement of Sultan Ibrahim and accused him for committing treason against the Malay race by signing the treaties. News of the rally reached Sultan Ibrahim on 22 February, who was then residing at Grosvenor House Hotel in London. Sultan Ibrahim approached the colonial office and withdrew his support of the proposal, but this did not appease the political dissidents and Onn continued to organise more rallies in the other Malay states to muster further support for his calls against the Malayan Union, and formed United Malays National Organisation (UMNO) in May.

Sultan Ibrahim returned to Johor in early September 1947 and attended UMNO's second general meeting at the Istana Besar. Although many Johorean politicians still held critical opinions of Sultan Ibrahim over the treaties with MacMichael, the UMNO delegates gave him a rousing welcome when he arrived at the palace. Critical opinions against the Sultan waned after the Federation of Malaya was established the following January, which restored the rulers' powers. Shortly before Sultan Ibrahim left for England in May, he personally donated $5,000 to UMNO, hoping to improve relations with UMNO leaders and Onn himself, who had been appointed the Menteri Besar of Johor in 1946.

=== Pre-independence Malaya (1948–1957) ===
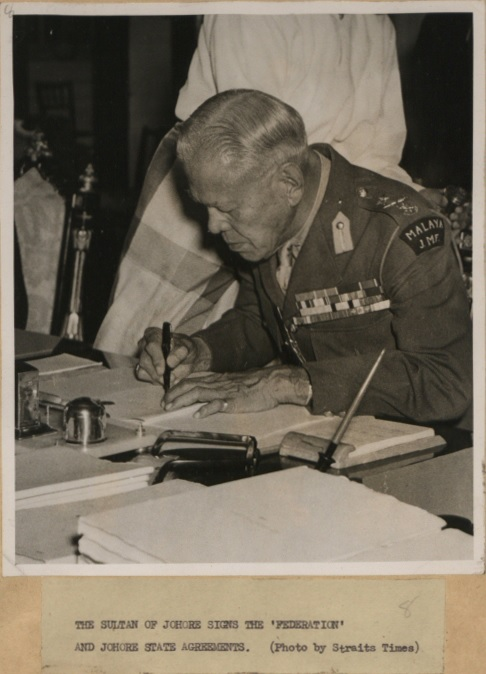
Ibrahim of Johor signs the Federation of Malaya and Johor State Agreements, 1948.

The establishment of the federation did not go down well with the Chinese, as favourable conditions for obtaining citizenship for the Chinese and other non-Malays were withdrawn. The Malaysian Chinese Association (MCA) was formed in 1949 under the leadership of a Straits Chinese businessman, Tan Cheng Lock who frequently raised grievances over the citizenship terms that were set when the federation was established. As a result, communal tensions between the Malays and Chinese surfaced, and Onn kept his distance from Tan. Tan encountered initial difficulties with meeting the Sultan, who was not accustomed to working with Chinese businessmen. Sultan Ibrahim also became increasingly disappointed in Onn's work commitment, whom he saw as neglecting state affairs as a result of his commitments towards the UMNO. In early 1950, Sultan Ibrahim approached Onn, who was asked to choose between committing his efforts to the state or the UMNO. Onn chose to the latter, and resigned as the Menteri Besar of Johor in May.

Sultan Ibrahim became increasingly uncomfortable with the idea of Johor as a state within the Federation of Malaya, particularly when the prospect of an independent federation free from British interference became increasingly clear under Tunku Abdul Rahman's leadership. In a letter which he wrote to The Straits Times in 1953, "Straits Settlement Forever", Sultan Ibrahim expressed a sceptical opinion of Johor's future as part of an independent Malaya, and voiced support for the continuation of British Adviser system in Johor. At his Diamond Jubilee celebrations in September 1955, Sultan Ibrahim publicly called for Johor's secession from the Federation. Sultan Ibrahim's calls for secession inspired the formation of the Persatuan Kebangsaan Melayu Johor (PKMJ) the following month, a secessionist movement led by Ungku Abdullah bin Omar, a relative of Sultan Ibrahim who was serving as one of Johor's state executive councillor. The Sultan voiced public support for the PKMJ during a public gathering in mid-December 1955, and the PKMJ courted considerable grassroot support from in first half of 1956.

The Alliance Party reacted strongly to the events which motivated the formation of the PKMJ, and called for the Alliance-dominated Johor state executive council to vet all future state-policy speeches that will be made by the Sultan or members of the royal family. In particular, the Alliance Party reacted with great hostility to the existence of the PKMJ, and actively attempted to suppress and discredit the party. The PKMJ rapidly lost most of its members to UMNO, and by mid-1957 Ungku Abdullah only had ten members left in the party. Meanwhile, at the Conference of Rulers in March 1957, Tunku Abdul Rahman expressed his desire to elect Sultan Ibrahim as the first Yang di-Pertuan Agong of Malaysia, but Sultan Ibrahim declined on grounds of his old age and desire to lead his final years in retirement.

Four months later in July 1957, Ungku Abdullah made one last call to urge Sultan Ibrahim not to sign the Malayan Federal Constitution. The Sultan, who was now residing in London, replied to Ungku Abdullah that he had empowered the Tunku Mahkota, Tunku Ismail (later Sultan Ismail) to decide on the matter. Ungku Abdullah then called upon Tunku Ismail not to sign the constitution, but his calls were ignored and Tunku Ismail proceeded to sign the constitution at the ruler's meeting. Following the ordeal, Ungku Abdullah formally disbanded the party a few days before Malaya's declaration of independence on 31 August.

== Foreign relations ==
Sultan Ibrahim spent much of his time residing in England, often dealing with the colonial office in London over state affairs. His relations with the United Kingdom were often strained over both state and personal matters, especially with leading figures from the colonial office. From the mid-1930s onwards, Sultan Ibrahim fostered personal friends with the British monarchs, and made a cash donation of £500,000 for the Silver Jubilee of King George V, much of which was used to fund the construction of the Singapore Naval Base at Sembawang. Three years later, Sultan Ibrahim made a detour to Germany during his visit to Europe and met with Adolf Hitler and was briefly detained by the French police following the visit when they mistook him for a spy.

Sultan Ibrahim also became a close acquaintance with Yoshichika Tokugawa after the latter visited Johor in 1921. They became friends, partly due to their shared interest in tiger hunting, as well as Tokugawa's ability to communicate in fluent Malay. Tokugawa's personal friendship with the Sultan encouraged Japanese businessmen to invest in the state's rubber plantations from the 1920s onwards. The Sultan visited Japan in 1934, at the invitation of Tokugawa.

== Wealth ==
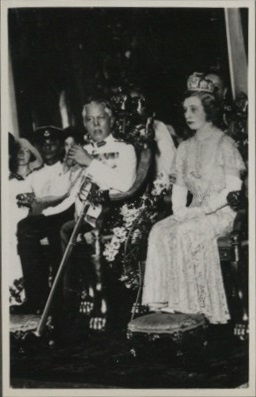
Sultan Ibrahim and Sultanah Helen Ibrahim in Singapore, 1935.

During his reign, the Sultan was considered to be "fabulously wealthy." He also had a reputation as a wild international playboy. His exploits included changing the colour of his racing horse to present it as an unknown with better odds and going to the red-light area of Vienna. He gave a pair of Malayan tigers to the Edinburgh Zoo and sent a huge cash present to King George V on his Jubilee.

The Sultan was an Anglophile and spent much of his life away from Johor, preferring the more liberal delights of Europe. He sent his sons, by his Malay wives, to be educated in Britain.

The Sultan was reported to have given Sultanah Helen Ibrahim a spectacular jewel collection, reputedly giving her an emerald on her birthday and a diamond on their wedding anniversary, even after the divorce.

== Family ==
Sultan Ibrahim was the only son of Che Wan Abu Bakar, Temenggung of Johor by Che Puan Besar Zubaidah (née Cecilia Catharina Lange, 1848–1936). Zubaidah was the daughter of Mads Johansen Lange; a Balinese-based Danish businessman and his Chinese wife, Nonna Sang Nio (born Ong Sang Nio). Nonna, who was born in Southern China, lived in East Java for a time prior to her marriage to Lange. He had one sister, Mariam (born 1871).

=== Marriage ===
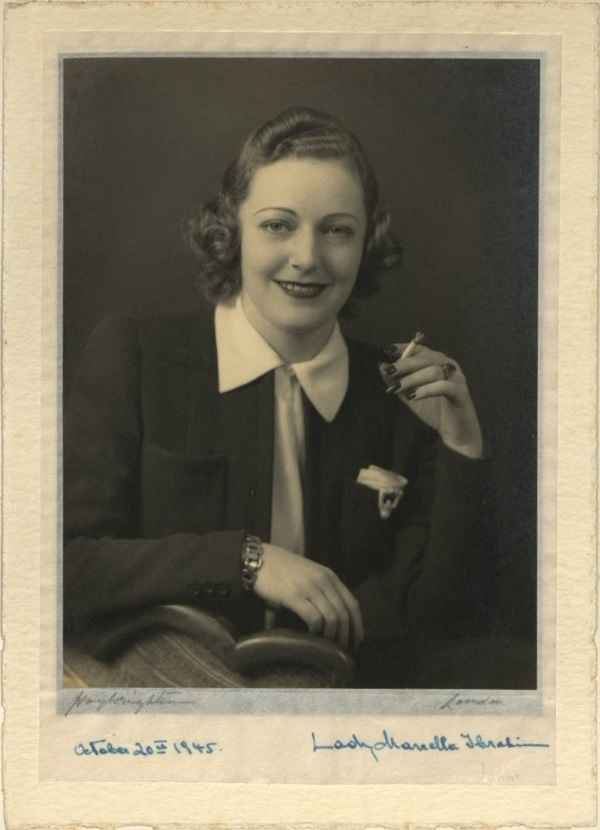
Lady Marcella Ibrahim, 20 October 1945.

Sultan Ibrahim married at least four official wives who became sultanas of Johor. They were:

1. Ungku Maimunah Binti Ungku Abdul Majid (died 1909); married 5 October 1892, they had one son, Tunku Ismail (Sultan of Johor) (28 October 1894 – 10 May 1981).
2. Enche' Rogayah (died 1926); married in 1920, they had one son, Tunku Haris Abu Bakar (Tunku Aris Bendahara of Johor) (17 February 1898 – 1 May 1956).
3. Enche' Hasnah Binti Dato' Ja'afar: Hasnah was the daughter of Dato' Ja'afar bin Haji Muhammad, the first Johor Menteri Besar, and the younger sister of Dato' Onn Bin Ja'afar, He also had a son by Hasnah Binti Dato' Ja'afar: Tunku Ahmad (Tunku Temenggong of Johor) (28 July 1898 – 26 October 1983).
4. Ungku Intan Binti Ungku Ahmad: Married in 1926, Ungku Intan was the daughter of Ungku Ahmad bin Ungku Muhammad.
5. Helen Bartholomew Wilson (1899–1977), former wife of William Brockie Wilson; married 15 October 1930, divorced 30 March 1938.
6. Marcella Mendl (1915–1982), daughter of Edgar Mendl from Romania and cousin of British diplomat Sir Charles Mendl. Upon converting to Islam, she took the name Fawzia binti Abdullah and was known as Lady Marcella Ibrahim (1940–1955) and Her Highness Sultana Fawzia binti Abdullah (1955–1982). Married in 1940, they had one daughter, Tunku Meriam (18 September 1950 – 4 July 2014) (married in 1976–1980 to British rock star Barry Ryan) Besides Malay, she was fluent in several European languages such as German, French, and English.

== Death ==
Sultan Ibrahim spent the last two years of his life at his apartment at Grosvenor House Hotel in London. He spent most of his time watching television and visiting theatres and enjoyed the company of his sixth wife, Marcella Mendl and their beloved daughter, Tunku Meriam. The Sultan died on 8 May 1959 at his apartment, with his wife reportedly at his bedside during his last hours. Tunku Ismail succeeded his father as the Sultan of Johor, and many Malay and British leaders who worked with him publicly expressed their condolences to the late Sultan within the first two weeks of his death. The Sultan's body was shipped back to Johor Bahru and arrived the following month, where he was given a state funeral and with body laying in state between 4 and 6 June at the Istana Besar.

At the time of his death, Sultan Ibrahim was the longest reigning Sultan of Johor, having ruled for 64 years.

== Legacy ==
In recent years, efforts have been made by the Sultan's heirs to rehabilitate his image and paint him as a benevolent ruler. Critics claim that he is largely remembered as an anti-independence figure, a wastrel and a close ally of the British. Even with that view, he is viewed as the man whom continued his father's legacy of investing in pepper, gambier and rubber, which largely improved the economic situation of Johor. The posthumous title of "the Famous" (in Malay, mil Masyhur) conferred on him by his grandson Sultan Iskandar, never caught on.

== Honours ==
- Malaya
  - Recipient of the Order of the Crown of the Realm (DMN) (31 August 1958)
- Johor
  - Grand Commander (DK I) (23 May 1891) and Grand Master (1895) of the Royal Family Order of Johor
  - Knight Grand Commander (SPMJ) (23 May 1891) and Grand Master (1895) of the Order of the Crown of Johor
- Kelantan
  - Recipient of the Royal Family Order of Kelantan (DK) (9 October 1953)
- United Kingdom
  - Recipient of the Queen Victoria Diamond Jubilee Medal (1897)
  - Honorary Knight Commander of the Order of St Michael and St George (KCMG) – Sir (22 June 1897)
  - Recipient of the King Edward VII Coronation Medal (1902)
  - Recipient of the King George V Coronation Medal (1911)
  - Knight Grand Cross of the Order of St Michael and St George (GCMG) – Sir (1 January 1916)
  - Knight Commander of the Order of the British Empire (KBE) – Sir (1 January 1918)
  - King George V Silver Jubilee Medal (1935)
  - Knight Grand Cross of the Order of the British Empire (GBE) – Sir (3 June 1935)
  - King George VI Coronation Medal (1937)
  - Recipient of the Queen Elizabeth II Coronation Medal (1953)
- Ottoman Empire
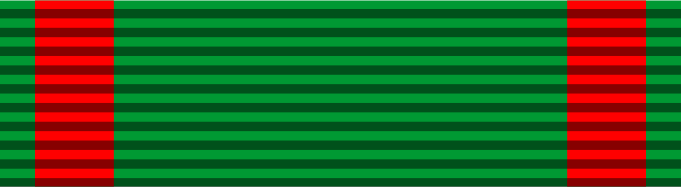
  - 1st Class of the Imperial Order of Osminieh (Nishan-e-Osmanieh) (1898)
- Italy
  - Knight Grand Cross of the Order of the Crown of Italy (1938)
- Romania
  - Grand Cross of the Order of the Crown of Romania (1920)
- Thailand
  - Knight Grand Cordon (Special Class) of the Order of the White Elephant (KGE) (1924)
  - Knight Grand Cordon (Special Class) of the Order of the Crown of Siam
- Annam (French protectorate)
  - Grand Cordon of the Order of the Dragon of Annam (1933)
- Cambodia
  - Grand Cross of the Royal Order of Cambodia (1933)
- Japan
  - Grand Cordon of the Order of the Rising Sun (1934)
- Zanzibar
  - Grand Cross of the Order of the Brilliant Star of Zanzibar

== Notes ==
Regnal titles
| Preceded by Sultan Abu Bakar | Sultan of Johor; 1895–1959 | Succeeded by Sultan Ismail |
