= Masjid Temenggong Daeng Ibrahim =

Historic mosque in Telok Blangah, Singapore

Temenggong Daeng Ibrahim Mosque مسجد ديراجا تيلوك بلانغه
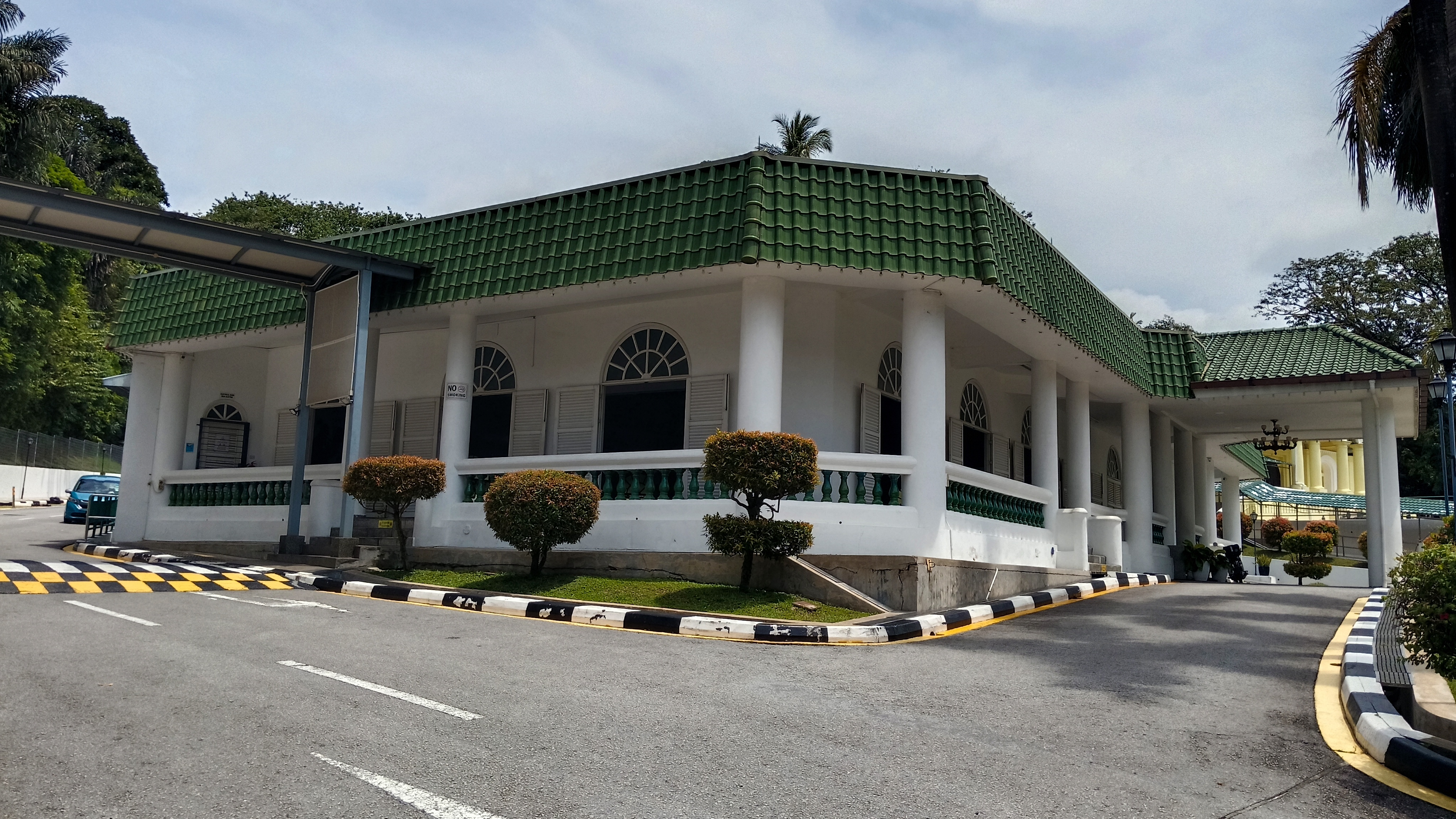

- Location in Singapore

Religion
- Affiliation: Sunni Islam

Location
- Location: 30 Telok Blangah Road, Singapore 098827
- Country: Singapore
- Coordinates: 1.2661313°N 103.8241358°E

Architecture
- Type: Congregational mosque
- Style: Malay architecture
- Founder: Temenggong Daeng Ibrahim
- Completed: 1845; 1993 (Reconstruction)

The Temenggong Daeng Ibrahim Mosque, formerly known as the Grand Mosque of Telok Blangah (Malay: Masjid Jamek Telok Blangah), is a historic congregational mosque located in the Telok Blangah subzone of Bukit Merah, Singapore. Originating as a royal courthouse of the Istana Lama which was later converted into a mosque in 1845 and rebuilt in 1993, it is managed and owned by the State of Johor through its Islamic council. It is one of the very few mosques in Singapore that are not under the purview of the Majlis Ugama Islam Singapura.

== Etymology ==
The present-day mosque is named after Temenggong Daeng Ibrahim, the fourth Temenggong of Johor who also served as de facto ruler of colonial Johor from 1825 to 1862.

== History ==
The main building of the mosque was originally a courthouse that was part of the Istana Lama, serving as both a lounge and a place where residents could give their feedback to the reigning Temenggong of Johor. It was also situated next to the private cemetery of the Bendahara dynasty, which included the Makam Diraja Johor Telok Blangah, the burial place of the Temenggongs. In 1845, the courthouse was converted into a congregational mosque under the orders of Temenggong Daeng Ibrahim. The new mosque was later known as the Grand Mosque of Telok Blangah and was open to members of the public for both daily prayers and the Friday prayer. A new pulpit, carved from wood by Malay artisans in 1868, was also installed in the mosque within the same year of its creation. Even after the independence of Singapore, ownership and management of the Grand Mosque of Telok Blangah and its adjoining burial ground continued to be undertaken by the State of Johor, under Johor's Islamic council, the Jabatan Agama Islam Johor (JAIJ).

By 1991, the mosque had reached a state of dilapidation and hence the reigning ruler, Iskandar of Johor, ordered a complete reconstruction of the Grand Mosque of Telok Blangah. The mosque was demolished in the same year and completely rebuilt, with construction works completed in 1993. It was also renamed the Temenggong Daeng Ibrahim Mosque, in honour of Daeng Ibrahim.

== Ownership ==
Both the Temenggong Daeng Ibrahim Mosque and the royal burial ground next to it are owned by the government of Johor. Two flag poles also stand in the courtyard of the mosque, one with the Flag of Singapore and the other with the Flag of Johor. It is managed by the Islamic council of Johor, the Jabatan Agama Islam Johor (JAIJ) as well. The staff of the mosque, such as the Imam, muezzin and groundskeepers are all residents of Malaysia who have been deployed from overseas and have a valid work permit from Singapore's Ministry of Manpower. Although the site is owned by an overseas entity, the laws of Singapore still apply to the site and hence the Singaporean government has the authority to limit access to the mosque as part of safety measures, for example during the COVID-19 pandemic. As the site is not managed by the Majlis Ugama Islam Singapura, it does not constitute as a locally managed waqf in their directory.

== Transportation ==
The Temenggong Daeng Ibrahim Mosque is within walking distance from the HarbourFront MRT station.

== See also ==
- Islam in Singapore
- List of mosques in Singapore
