= Makam Diraja Johor Telok Blangah =

Johor royal mausoleum located in Singapore

The Johor Royal Mausoleum
- Makam Diraja Johor Telok Blangah
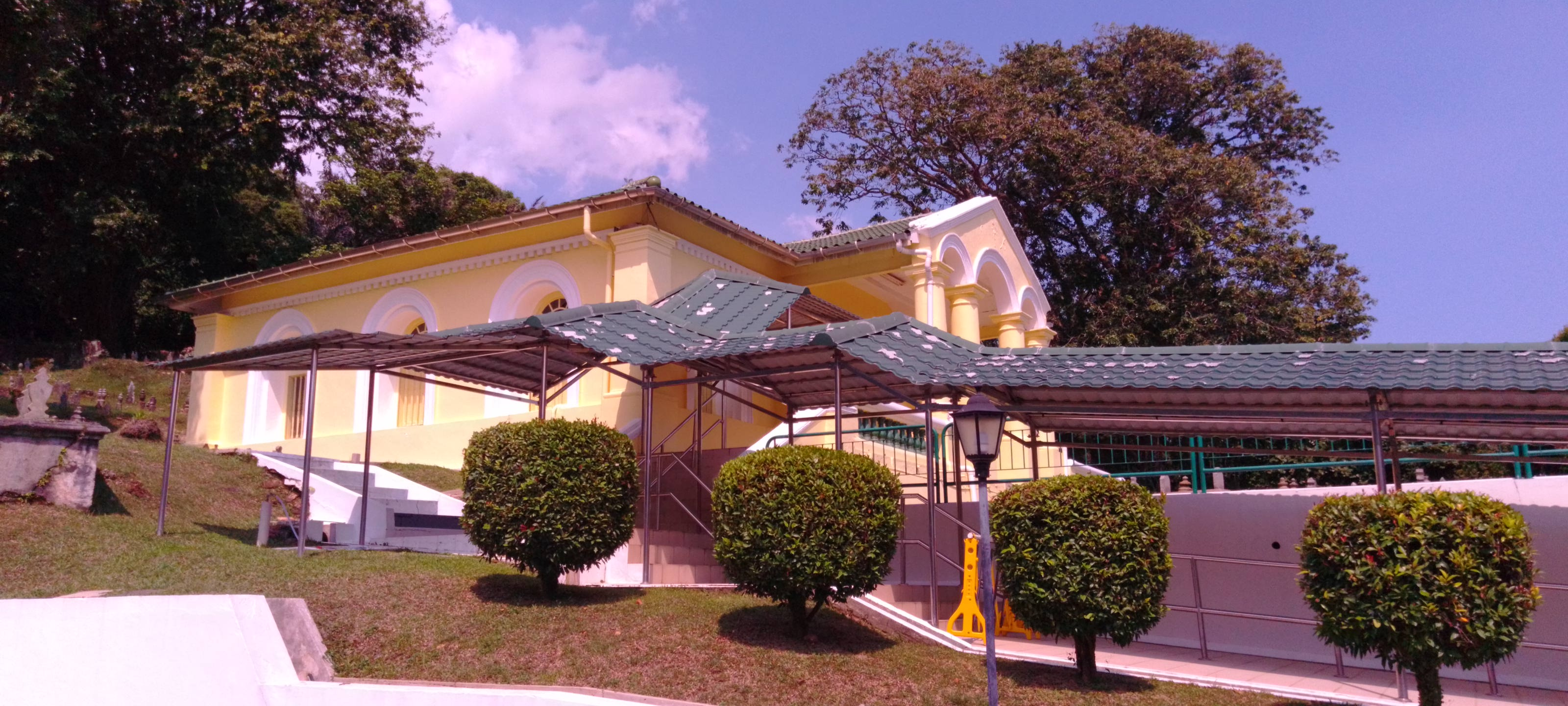
- The royal mausoleum, pictured in 2025.
- Interactive map of The Johor Royal Mausoleum

Details
- Established: 1825 (cemetery), 1849 (mausoleum)
- Closed: circa 1900
- Location: Telok Blangah, Singapore
- Country: Singapore
- Coordinates: 1.2662858°N 103.8242739°E
- Type: Muslim, Malay
- Owned by: State of Johor
- No. of interments: 32 members of the Bendahara dynasty

Makam Diraja Johor Telok Blangah (Jawi: مقام دراج خوهر تاوق بلاڠه), also known as The Johor Royal Mausoleum, is a royal mausoleum located within the grounds of Masjid Temenggong Daeng Ibrahim in Telok Blangah, Singapore. It is the resting place of Temenggong Abdul Rahman, his son Temenggong Daeng Ibrahim, and other members and relatives of the Bendahara dynasty.

The mausoleum is surrounded by a large cemetery as well. The land where the cemetery, mausoleum and adjacent mosque stands on is owned by the State of Johor.

== History ==
Temenggong Abdul Rahman was the first of the Bendahara dynasty to be buried at the site on 8 December 1825 after he had died in his residence, the Istana Lama. Afterwards, his son Temenggong Daeng Ibrahim was laid to rest beside him. The burial of Daeng Ibrahim was followed by other members of his family afterwards.

A mausoleum was built around the tombs of the Temenggongs in 1849, although at the time it was surrounded by at least a hundred older graves. The burial ground contains several old graves from the colonial era as well as a mausoleum containing the tombs of most of the Temenggongs of Johor and members of the Bendahara dynasty. At least thirty two old graves in the cemetery belong to either royalty or aristocratic Malays.

The cemetery was also intended to be where Radin Mas Ayu was buried, but this did not come to fruition and she was buried at a hill below Mount Faber instead.

The last person to be interred in the mausoleum was Ungku Muhammad Khalid, one of Daeng Ibrahim's sons and the brother of Sultan Abu Bakar, in 1900.

=== Ownership ===
The land which the Makam Diraja Johor Telok Blangah stands on is owned by the State of Johor. The workers and staff at the mausoleum are citizens of Malaysia who have been sent to work full-time jobs there; the same applies to the adjacent mosque. In an article from 1989, it is stated that the royalty of Johor would embark on regular visits to the mausoleum to pay respects to their deceased ancestors.

== Burials ==
According to the Berita Harian newspaper, there were at least 32 graves in the cemetery belonging to royalty, including those of the Temenggongs buried in the mausoleum. In total, there are around 2,000 tombs in the whole cemetery.

=== Notable burials ===
Interred in the mausoleum are:

- Temenggong Abdul Rahman (1755–1825), third Temenggong of Johor
- Tun Haji Abdullah (1809–1861), son of Temenggong Abdul Rahman
- Temenggong Daeng Ibrahim (1810–1862), fourth Temenggong of Johor
- Ungku Muhammad Khalid (1849–1900), son of Temenggong Daeng Ibrahim

Within the mausoleum, there is also a grave belonging to Ataullah Efendi, an Ottoman consul general. This is one of two objects of Ottoman heritage in Singapore, the other being the minaret of Masjid Alkaff Upper Serangoon, a national heritage monument.

== Gallery ==
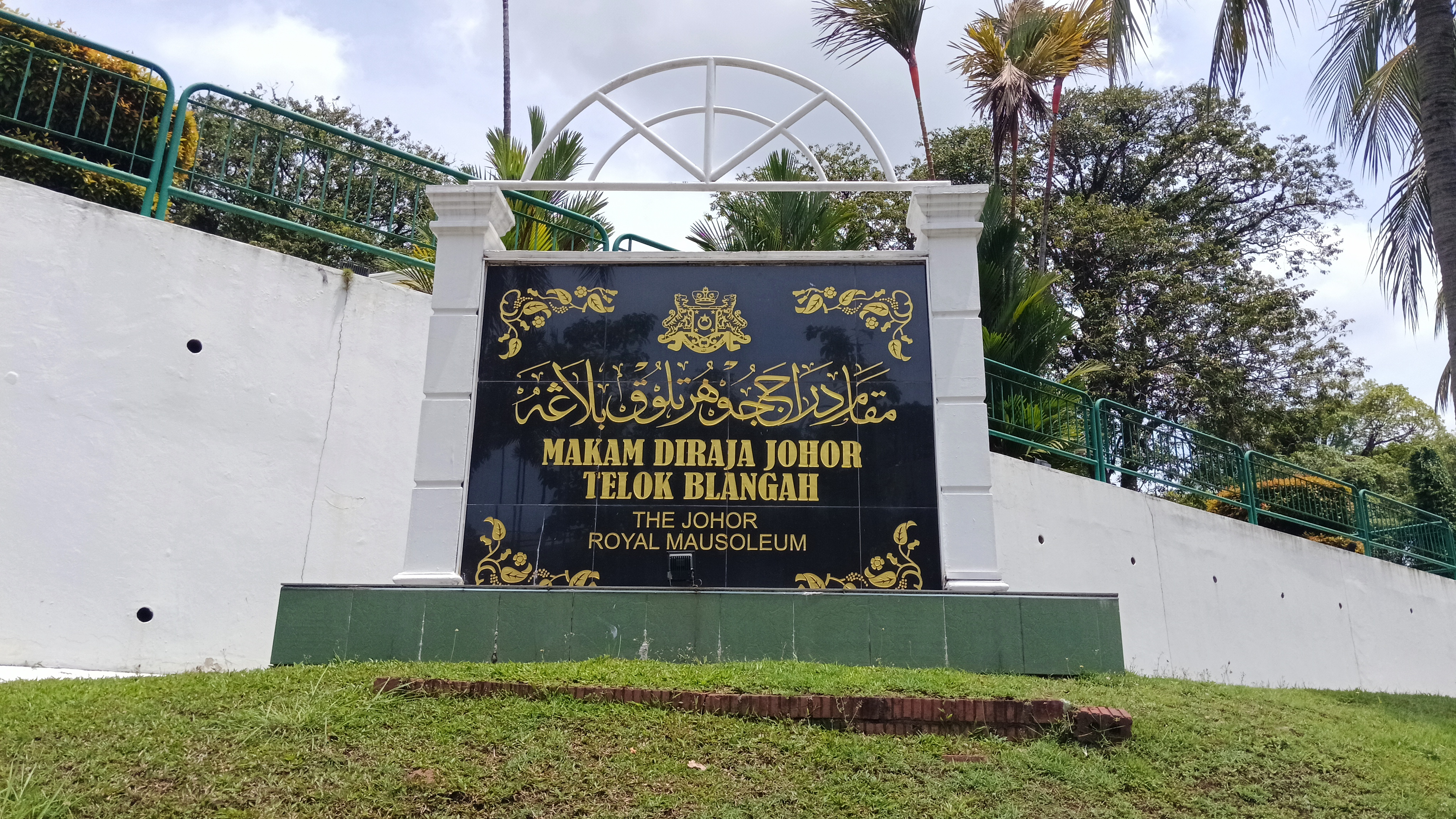
A sign indicating the royal cemetery.

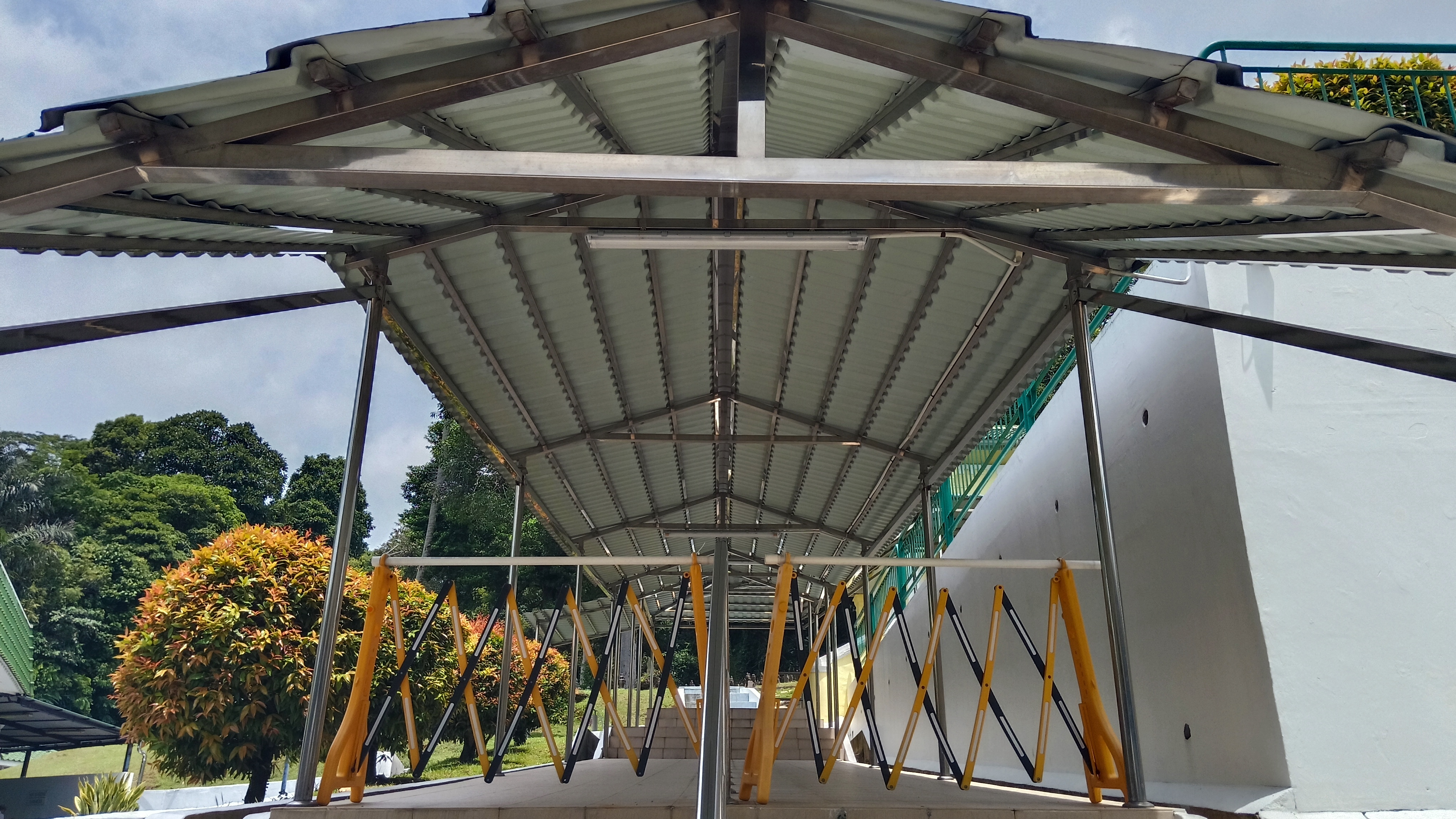
The entrance to the burial ground and the mausoleum are blockaded.

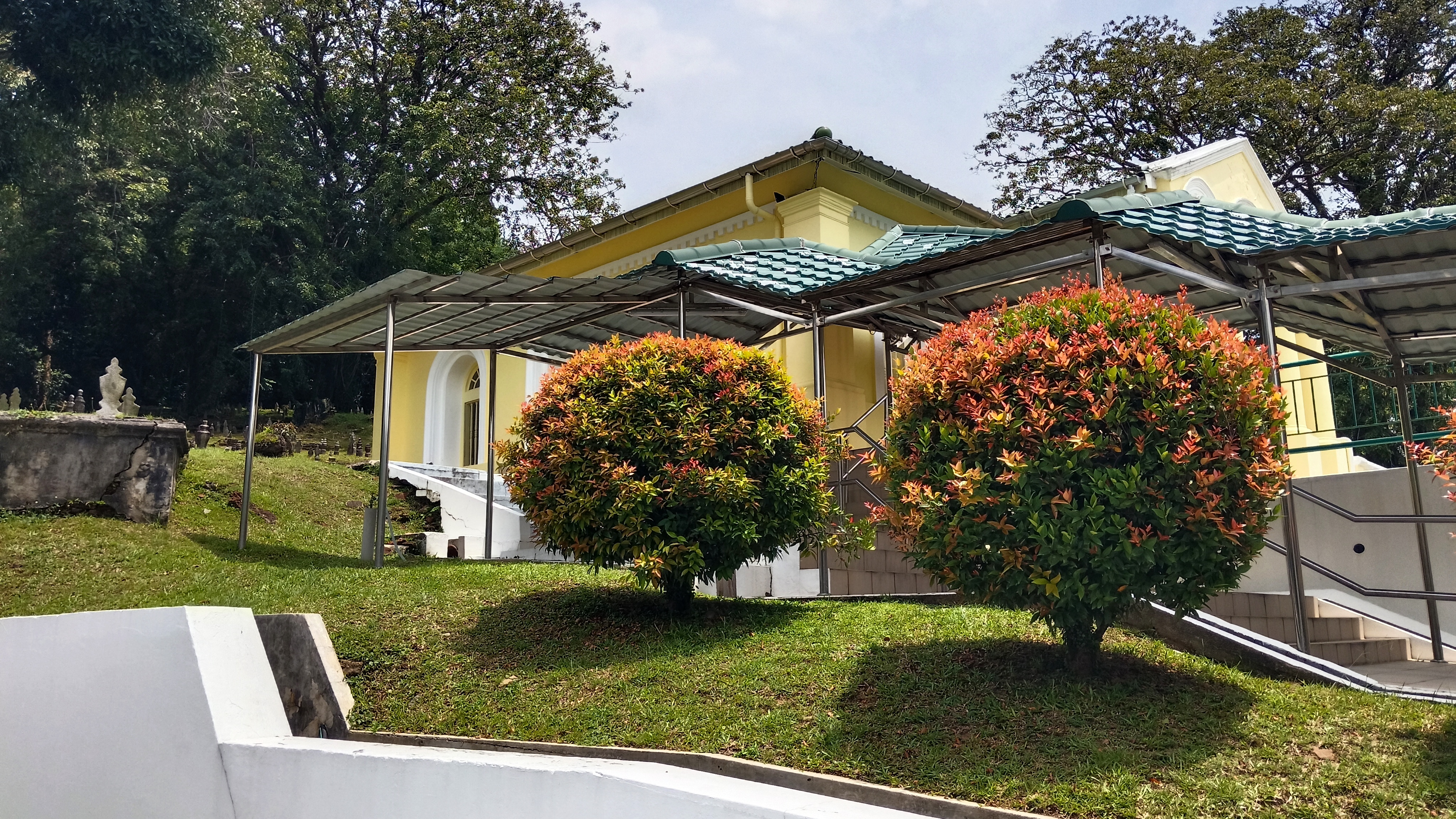
Trees in front of the mausoleum.

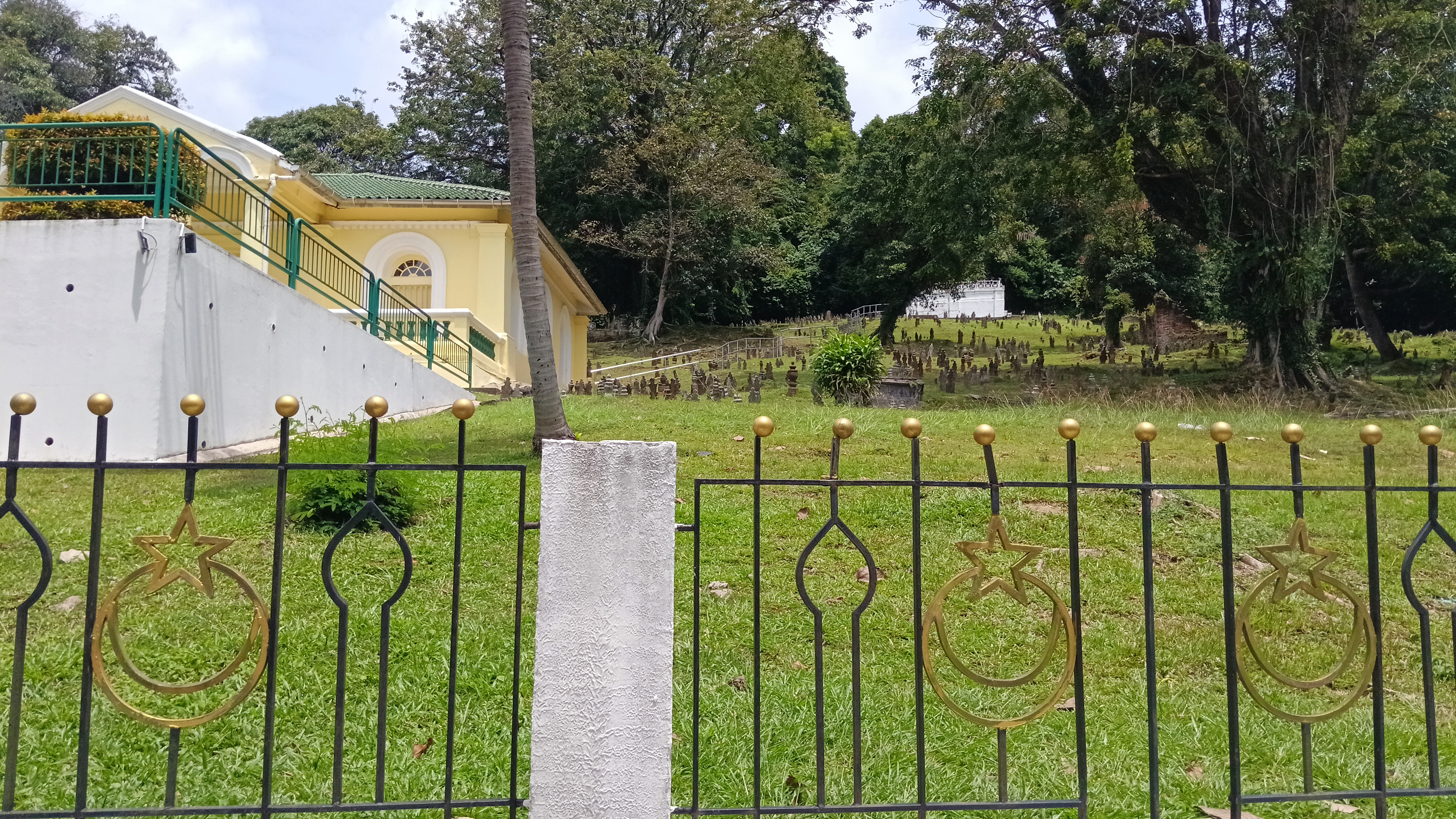
The mausoleum on the left, and the cemetery on the right, as seen from outside the perimeter fencing.

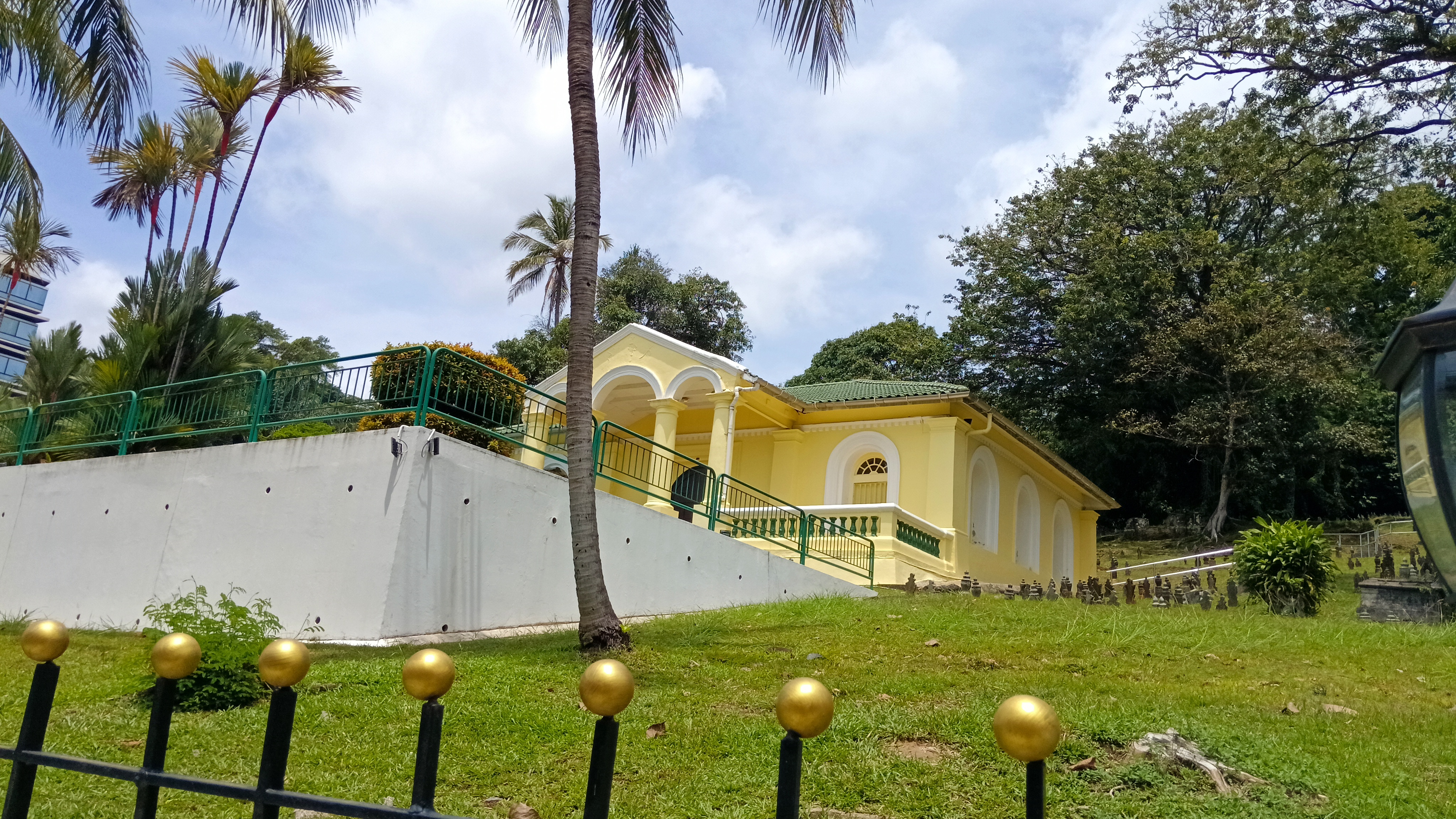
A better look at the mausoleum from outside the perimeter fencing.

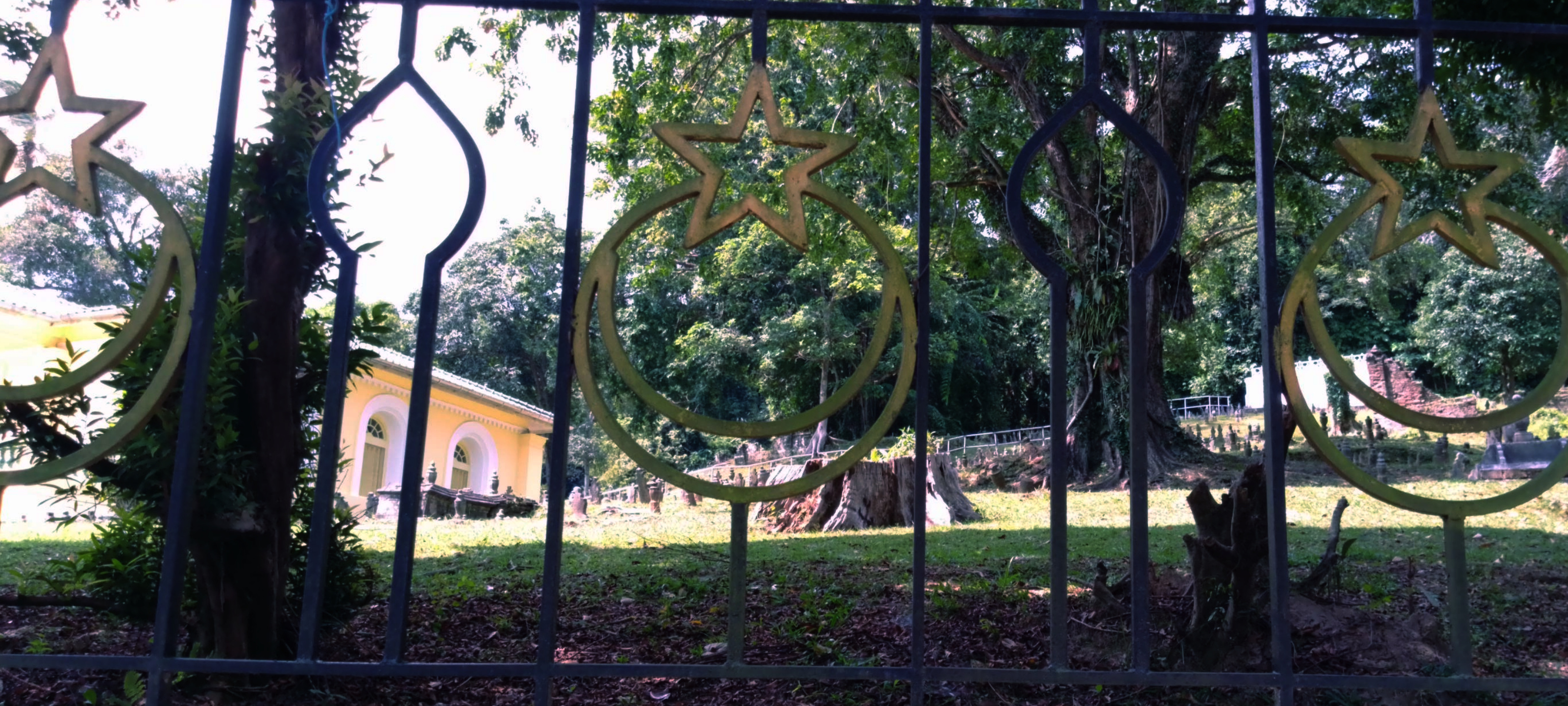
A view of the cemetery and mausoleum from outside of the gate.

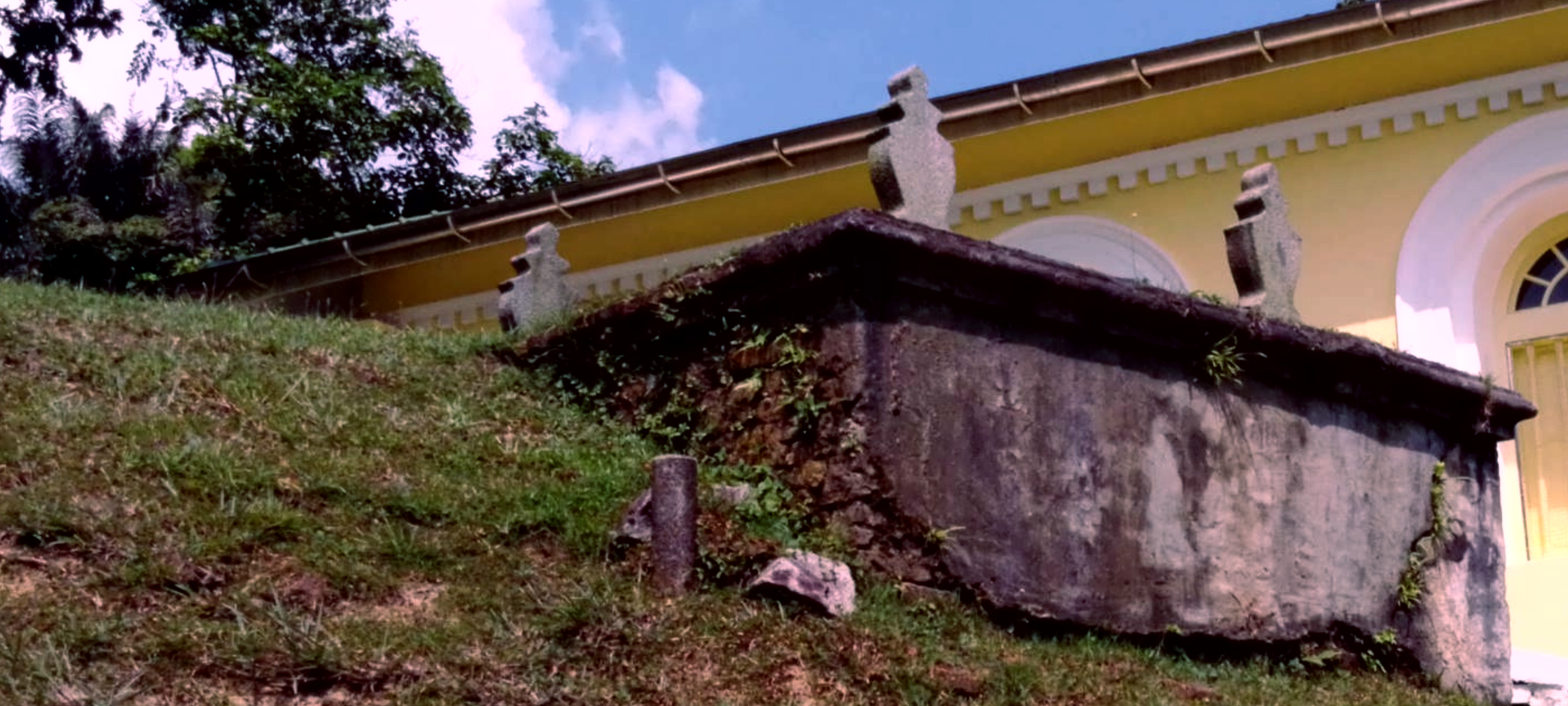
An old grave next to the mausoleum which has a "dapur" (cenotaph) atop it.

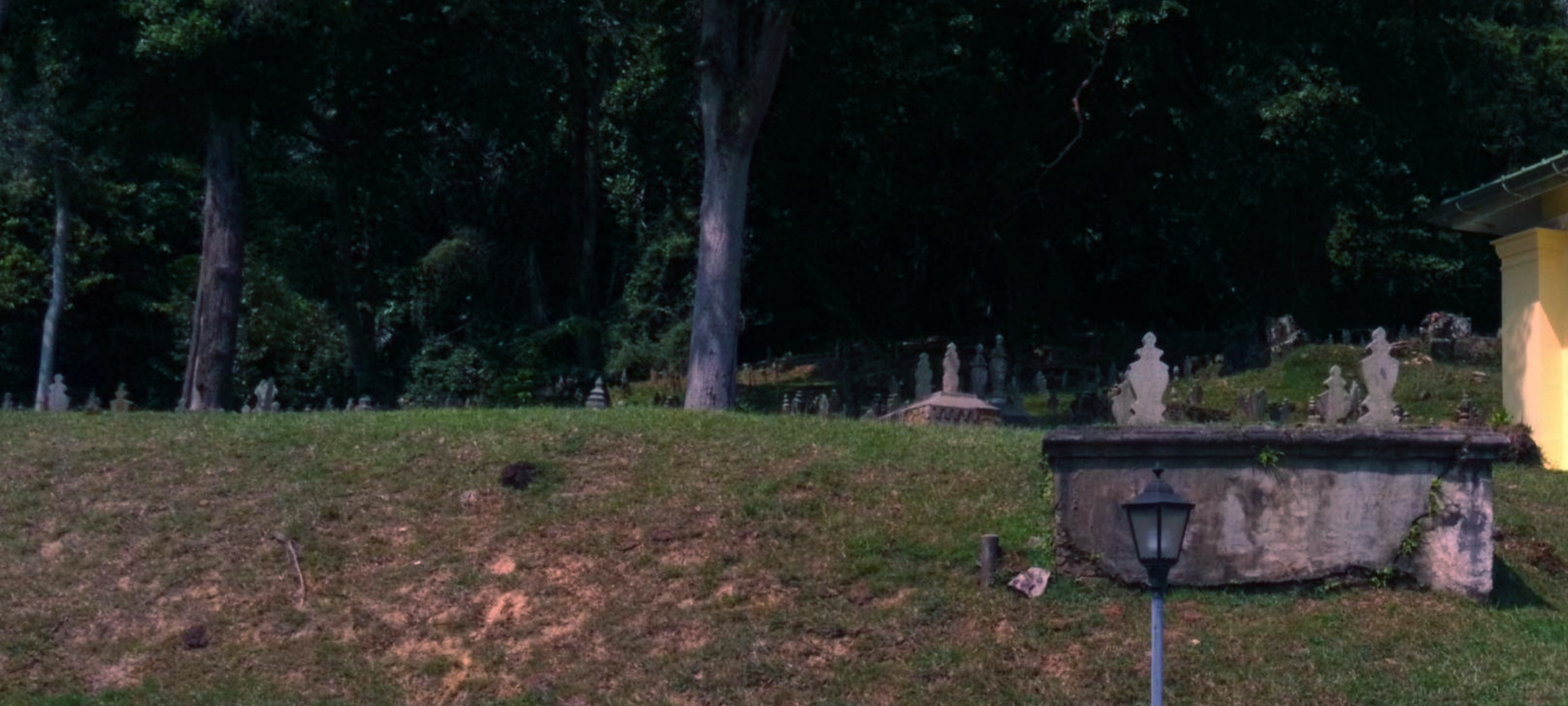
A landscape view of the cemetery surrounding the mausoleum.

== See also ==
- Masjid Temenggong Daeng Ibrahim
- Marang Cemetery
- Muslim cemeteries in Singapore
