= Temenggong of Johor =

Noble position in the Sultanate of Johor

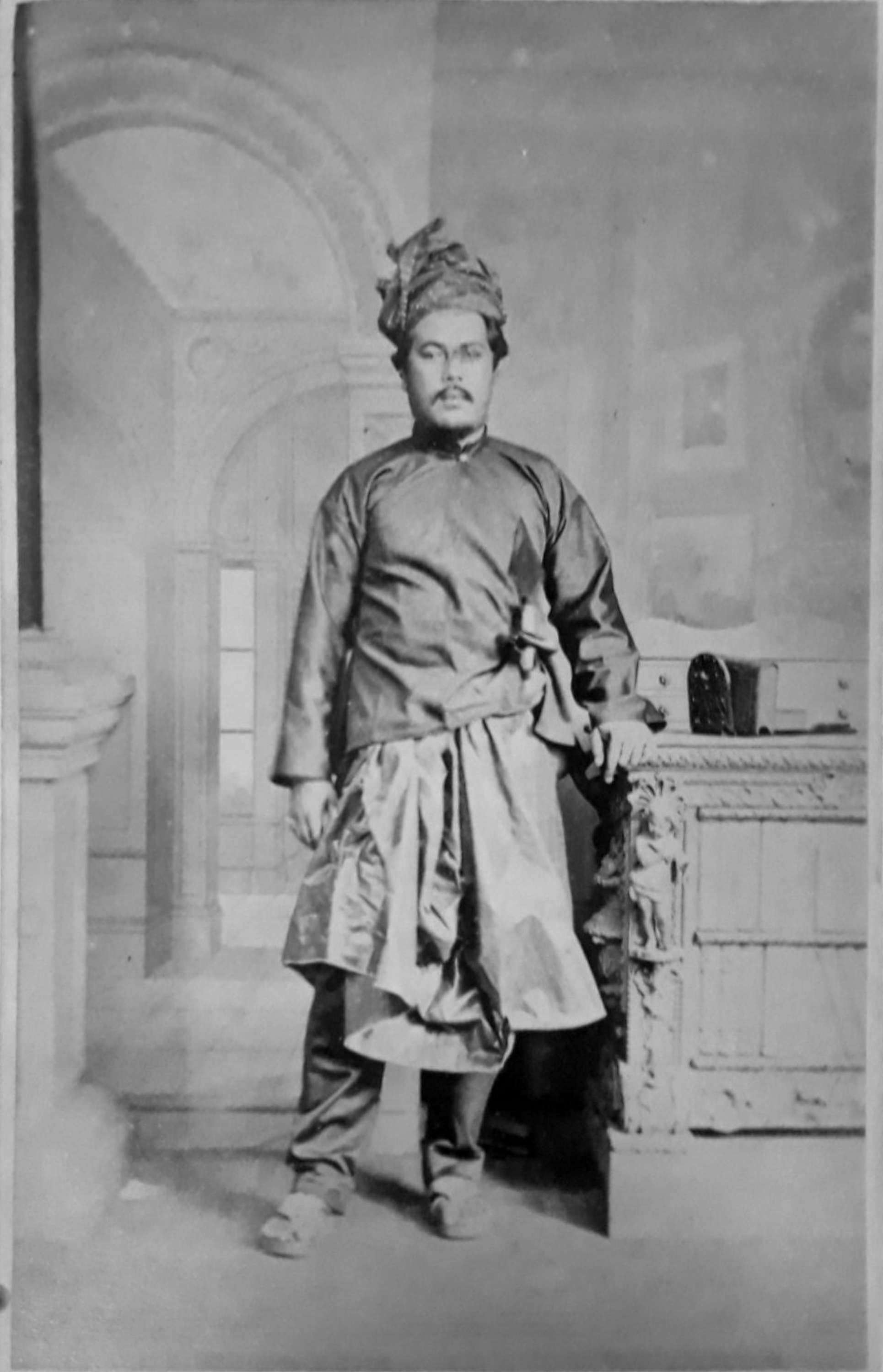
- Wan Abu Bakar as the last Temenggong of Johor
- Creation date: 1757
- Creation: Johor Sultanate
- Created by: Abdul Jalil Shah III of Johor
- First holder: Temenggong Abdul Jamal
- Last holder: Temenggong Abu Bakar
- Status: Abolished
- Extinction date: 29 June 1868
- Former seat: Istana Temenggong

The Temenggong of Johor was one of the members of the Orang Kaya Council established by Sultan Abdul Jalil Shah of the Johor Sultanate.

== History ==
The first Temenggong appointed was Temenggong Abdul Jamal in 1757.

The Temenggong of Johor was given the task of controlling the security of the sultan, safeguarding the state and exercising control over the territories of the Johor Sultanate.

The Temenggong of Johor was granted territorial control by the Sultan of Johor for Singapura (later Singapore) as the representative of the Sultan of Johor-Riau, just as the Raja Bendahara of Pahang was given control of Pahang, the Yang di-Pertuan Muda of Riau was given Riau, and the Raja Temenggong of Muar was given control of Muar.

The descendants of the House of Temenggong would later found the new sultanate on mainland Johor with the first sultan of modern Johor being Abu Bakar.

== List of Temenggongs of Johor ==
No.	Temenggong of Johor	In office	Sultans
1	Temenggong Abdul Jamal	1757–1802	Sulaiman Badrul Alam Shah of Johor (1757–1760); Abdul Jalil Muazzam Shah of Johor (1760–1761); Ahmad Riayat Shah of Johor (1761–1770); Mahmud Shah III of Johor (1770–1802)
2	Temenggong Abdul Hamid	1802–1803	Mahmud Shah III of Johor (1802–1803)
de facto	Engku Muda Muhammad	1803–1806	Mahmud Shah III of Johor (1803–1806)
3	Temenggong Abdul Rahman	1806 – 8 December 1825	Mahmud Shah III of Johor (1806–1812); Abdul Rahman Muazzam Shah (1812–1825)
de facto	Tun Haji Abdullah	8 December 1825 – 19 August 1841	Abdul Rahman Muazzam Shah (1825–1832); Muhammad II Muazzam Shah (1832–1835); Mahmud Muzaffar Shah (1835–1841)
4	Temenggong Daeng Ibrahim	19 August 1841 – 31 January 1862	Mahmud Muzaffar Shah (1841–1857); Sulaiman Badrul Alam Shah II (1857–1862)
5	Temenggong Abu Bakar	2 February 1862 – 29 June 1868	Sulaiman Badrul Alam Shah II (1862–1868)
