= Temenggong Abdul Rahman =

Abdul Rahman I
- 3rd Temenggong of Johor

Temenggong of Johor
- Reign: 1806 – 1825
- Predecessor: Engku Muda Muhammad
- Successor: Tun Haji Abdullah
- Born: Abdul Rahman bin Abdul Hamid; 1755; Johor Sultanate
- Died: 8 December 1825 (aged 69–70); Istana Bukit Aur, Teluk Belanga, Singapore, Straits Settlements
- Burial: Makam Diraja Teluk Blangah, Teluk Belanga, Singapore, Straits Settlements
- Spouses: Embong Tun Ahmad; Engku Raja Wuk Raja Sulaiman; Cik Yah Moffar
- Issue: Tun Haji Abdullah (son); Temenggong Tun; Daeng Ibrahim (son); Wan Abu Talib (son); 9 other children
- House: Bendahara (1755-1757); Temenggong (1757-died)
- Father: Abdul Hamid I bin Abdul Jamal I of Johor
- Mother: Tun Khamis
- Religion: Sunni Islam

Abdul Rahman I bin Abdul Hamid I of Johor (1755 – 8 December 1825) was the Temenggong of Johor during the Bendahara dynasty of the Johor Sultanate. He was best known of being instrumental in the Treaty of Singapore with the British East India Company in 1819.

== History ==
He was born in the Johor Sultanate in 1755 to Tun Abdul Hamid.

In 1802, his father was installed as the Temenggong by Sultan Mahmud Ri’ayat Shah after the death of his grandfather Temenggong Abdul Jamal.

However only a year later in 1803, his father died and the Sultan installed his uncle Engku Muda Muhammad as the Temenggong. Engku Muda Muhammad himself rejected the position and wanted the position of Yang di-Pertuan Muda instead, but the Sultan would not approve.

In 1806, Abdul Rahman was installed as Temenggong of Johor after his uncle's death by the Sultan at Lingga. Temenggong Abdul Rahman and his family and followers later moved to Singapura in 1811 to establish a governance there.

By the time Sir Stamford Raffles arrived in Singapura on 29 January 1819, there were an estimated 1,000 people there. The writings of Raffles and William Farquhar indicate that the British found Temenggong Abdul Rahman with 400 to 500 residents in Singapore in January 1819. Another member of the 1819 expedition party, Captain John Crawford, recalled in his diary an encounter with “upwards of 100” Chinese. British colonial documentations revealed that Temenggong Abdul Rahman had provided these Chinese, who were Teochews, the cost and expenses of opening gambier plantations at Mount Stamford (now Pearl’s Hill) prior to British arrival. He had also “in some instances” advanced money to the Teochew cultivators on the understanding he would be repaid in the form of gambier or other produce. Farquhar had the impression that the Temenggong’s interests in these plantations were represented by a brother-in-law of his named Baba Ketchil and the first Captain China of Singapore, a Teochew merchant named Tan Heng Kim ((陈亨钦), was “one of the principal persons concerned”.

There Raffles befriended Temenggong Abdul Rahman who lived near the river (present day Singapore River). Due to him being the staunch supporter of Tengku Hussein Shah and Hussein himself being his brother-in-law, the Temenggong helped Raffles to smuggle the exiled Hussein from Penyengat Island of Riau Islands to Singapura.

Raffles offered to recognize Hussein Shah as the rightful Sultan of Johor, and provide him with a yearly payment, but in return, Hussein would grant the British East India Company the right to establish the island as a trading post.

On 6 February 1819, Temenggong Abdul Rahman, with Hussein Shah signed the Treaty with Raffles and Major William Farquhar, marking Singapore as a British settlement. In the agreement, Sultan Hussein Shah received a yearly sum of 5,000 Spanish dollars, while the Temenggong himself received a yearly sum of 3,000 Spanish dollars and was therefore granted the hereditary style of His Highness by the British on 30 February 1819.

In 1823, Temenggong Abdul Rahman, his family and followers moved to the 200 acres of land (part of Teluk Belanga area) at the foot of hill (present day Mount Faber), as allocated by Raffles.

Temenggong Abdul Rahman and Sultan Hussein were called upon to sign the Treaty of Friendship and Alliance with the 2nd Resident of Singapore Dr John Crawfurd for the British Government at the Government Hill on 2 August 1824. In the agreement, the Sultan received 33,200 Spanish dollars and a monthly allowance of 1,300 Spanish dollars for life, while the Temenggong received a monthly stipend of 700 Spanish dollars in addition to a lump sum of 26,800 Spanish dollars, and agreed to maintain free trade in their possessions but were forbid to have any correspondence with foreigners without the EIC’s permission.

== Death ==
Temenggong Abdul Rahman died in his house Istana Bukit Aur at Teluk Belanga in 8 December 1825 and was buried at the nearby Makam Diraja Teluk Blangah. He was informally succeeded by his son Tun Haji Abdullah.

Regnal titles
Preceded by Engku Muda Muhammad; Temenggong of Johor (de facto)	Temenggong of Johor; 1806–1825	Succeeded by Tun Haji Abdullah; Temenggong of Johor (de facto)
