= Temenggong Daeng Ibrahim =

Temenggong of Johor (1810–1862)

Ibrahim I
- His Majesty the Ruler of Johor; His Royal Highness the 4th Temenggong of Johor
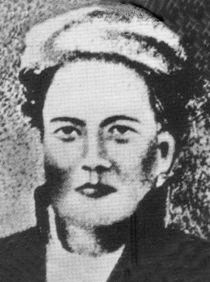

4th Temenggong of Johor
- Reign: 19 August 1841 – 31 January 1862
- Predecessor: Tun Haji Abdullah
- Successor: Abu Bakar

Ruler of Johor
- Reign: 10 March 1855 – 31 January 1862
- Predecessor: Himself; Temenggong of Johor
- Successor: Abu Bakar
- Born: Tun Daeng Ibrahim bin Tun Daeng Abdul Rahman; 8 December 1810; Pulau Bulang, Kepulauan Riau, Johor Sultanate
- Died: 31 January 1862 (aged 51); Istana Temenggong, Teluk Belanga, Singapore, Straits Settlements
- Burial: 1 February 1862; Makam Diraja Teluk Blangah, Teluk Belanga, Singapore, Straits Settlements
- Spouses: Inche Ngah Zulkaedah; Aisah Abdullah; Tengku Andak Sultan Abdul Rahman Muazzam Shah; Engku Long Muda
- Issue: Abu Bakar; Ungku Muhammad; Ungku Abdullah; Ungku Abdul Rahman; Ungku Abdul Majid; Ungku Muhammad Khalid; Ungku Daud; Ungku Besar; Ungku Pah; Ungku Khadija; Ungku Zaharah; Ungku Nong Haw
- House: Temenggong
- Father: Tun Daeng Abdul Rahman bin Temenggong Tun Daeng Abdul Hamid
- Mother: Inche Yah Moffar
- Religion: Sunni Islam

Ibrahim I bin Abdul Rahman I of Johor (8 December 1810 – 31 January 1862) was the Temenggong of Johor from 1841 to 1862. After he and Sultan Ali Iskandar Shah signed the 1855 treaty with the British Government in Singapore, he ruled Johor from 1855 to 1862.

== Biography ==
=== Early life ===
Daeng Ibrahim was born in Pulau Bulang, Kepulauan Riau on 8 December 1810 as the second son to Temenggong Abdul Rahman and Inche Yah Moffar. He was also known as Daeng Ronggek, Tengku Chik and Daeng Kechil. A year later in 1811, his family moved to Singapore Island and established a governance there, where they settled near the river (present day Singapore River).

In 1823, his father moved the family and their followers to the 200 acres of land (part of Teluk Belanga area) that was assigned by Stamford Raffles, the palace was known as Istana Bukit Aur and was later completed in 1824. His father died in the palace on 8 December 1825 and was informally succeeded by his elder brother Tun Haji Abdullah as the de facto Temenggong of Johor.

=== Reign ===
In 1833, Daeng Ibrahim took over his brother Tun Haji Abdullah as the de facto Temenggong of Johor. He later introduced the kangchu system to develop black pepper and gambir.

However his appointment as Temenggong of Johor was only officially made known on 19 August 1841, and was witnessed by the 4th Governor of the Straits Settlements George Bonham and the Raja Bendahara of Pahang Tun Ali at the New Harbour (present day Keppel Harbour).

==== 1855 treaty ====
On 10 March 1855, Ali Iskandar and Temenggong Daeng Ibrahim signed a treaty with the British Government in Singapore as officiated by the 5th Governor of the Straits Settlements William John Butterworth. In this treaty agreement, Ali Iskandar would be crowned as the Sultan of Johor and receive 5,000 Spanish dollars with an allowance of 500 per month, in return, he agreed to transfer all of his powers of the Johor territory to Daeng Ibrahim, save for Kesang, Muar which would be the only territory under his control. Although the treaty recognised Ali Iskandar as the Sultan of Johor, the title cannot be passed on to his offspring. Thus, Temenggong Daeng Ibrahim became the Ruler of Johor, he renamed this territory as Iskandar Puteri and administered it from his residence in Teluk Belanga.

As the Sultan of the Riau-Lingga Sultanate Mahmud Muzaffar Shah was ousted by the Dutch on 7 October 1857 and Sulaiman Badrul Alam Shah II was installed as his successor. Raja Temenggong Daeng Ibrahim, aware of the situation and later in 1861, signed a treaty with Raja Bendahara of Pahang Tun Mutahir. The treaty recognized the territories of Johor, and the Temenggong and his descendant's right to rule it, as well as mutual protection and mutual recognition of Johor and Pahang. With the signing of this treaty, the remnants of the empire became two independent states, Johor and Pahang.

=== Death ===
Daeng Ibrahim died of high fever in his house Istana Temenggong at Teluk Belanga on 31 January 1862 and was buried at the nearby Makam Diraja Teluk Blangah with his father. He was succeeded by his eldest son Abu Bakar.

== Legacy ==
There are some places named after him in Singapore:

- Temenggong Road, off Telok Blangah Road
- Masjid Temenggong Daeng Ibrahim

Regnal titles
Preceded by Tun Haji Abdullah; Temenggong of Johor (de facto)	Temenggong of Johor; 19 August 1841 – 31 January 1862	Succeeded by Temenggong Abu Bakar
Preceded by Newly Created	Ruler of Johor; 10 March 1855 – 31 January 1862	Succeeded by Temenggong Abu Bakar
