= Abu Bakar of Johor =

Sultan of Johor (r. 1886–1895)

Abu Bakar أبو بكر
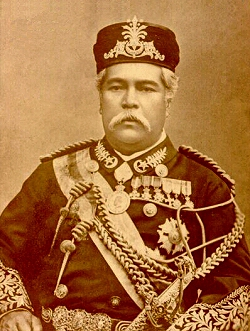

Sultan of Johor
- Reign: 13 February 1886 – 4 June 1895
- Coronation: 29 July 1886
- Predecessor: Sultan Ali Iskandar Shah
- Successor: Sultan Ibrahim
- Chief Minister: Jaafar Muhammad

Maharaja of Johor
- Reign: 30 June 1868 – 12 February 1886
- Predecessor: Post established
- Successor: Post abolished

Temenggong of Johor
- Reign: 2 February 1862 – 29 June 1868
- Predecessor: Daeng Ibrahim
- Successor: Post abolished
- Born: 3 February 1833; Istana Temenggong, Teluk Belanga, Singapore, Straits Settlements
- Died: 4 June 1895 (aged 62); Bailey's Hotel, South Kensington, London, United Kingdom
- Cause of death: Pneumonia
- Burial: 7 September 1895; Mahmoodiah Royal Mausoleum, Johor Bahru, Johor
- Spouse: Wan Chik binti Muhammad Tahir; Zubaidah binti Abdullah (née Cecilia Catharina Lange); Fatimah binti Abdullah (née Wong Ah Gew); Khadijah Khanum
- Issue: Tunku Ibrahim (Tunku Mahkota of Johor); Tunku Mariam (Tengku Ampuan of Pahang); Tunku Besar Putri; Tunku Azizah; Tunku Fatimah (Note: Tengku is also spelled as Tunku in Johor. (Milne, Mauzy, Malaysian Politics Under Mahathir, pg xv))
Names
- Wan Abu Bakar bin Tun Daeng Ibrahim
- House: Temenggong
- Father: Maharaja Tun; Daeng Ibrahim bin Temenggong Tun Daeng Abdul Rahman
- Mother: Cik' Ngah
- Religion: Sunni Islam

Abu Bakar (Jawi: المرحوم سلطان سر أبو بكر الخليل إبراهيم شاه ابن المرحوم تمڠڬوڠ تون داءيڠ إبراهيم سري مهاراج جوهر; 3 February 1833 – 4 June 1895) was the Temenggong of Johor. He was the 1st sultan of modern Johor from the House of Temenggong. (Note: Johor is the official spelling of the state. Generally, British colonial-era documents spelled the state's name as Johore. The modern English-speaking world has since adopted the official spelling of the state in documentary references to the state. See Hack, Rettig, Colonial armies in Southeast Asia, pg 262) He was also informally known as "The Father of Modern Johor", as many historians accredited Johor's development in the 19th century to Abu Bakar's leadership. He initiated policies and provided aids to ethnic Chinese entrepreneurs to stimulate the development of the state's agricultural economy which was founded by Chinese migrants from southern China in the 1840s. He also took charge of the development of Johor's infrastructure, administrative system, military and civil service, all of which were modelled closely along Western lines.

Abu Bakar was noted for his diplomatic skills, and both the British and Malay rulers had approached him for advice in making important decisions. He was also an avid traveller, and became the first Malay ruler to travel to Europe during his first visit to England in 1866. In particular, Abu Bakar became a lifelong friend of Queen Victoria in his later years. Abu Bakar's friendship with Queen Victoria played an important role in shaping Johor's relationships with Britain, and was the only state by the end of the 19th century in the Peninsular Malaya to maintain autonomy in its internal affairs as the British Colonial Government pushed for greater control over the Malay states by placing a British Resident in the states. He was also an Anglophile, and many of his personal habits and decisions were aligned to European ideas and tastes.

Abu Bakar became the sovereign ruler of Johor when his father, Temenggong Daeng Ibrahim died in 1862. Six years later, Abu Bakar changed his legal state title of "temenggong" to "maharaja". In 1885, Abu Bakar sought legal recognition from Britain for another change in his legal state title of "maharaja" to a regal title of "sultan", and was proclaimed the following year. In all, Abu Bakar's reign lasted for 32 years until his death in 1895.

== Early years ==
Wan Abu Bakar was born on 3 February 1833 in the Istana Temenggong at Teluk Belanga, Singapore. He was the eldest son of Temenggong Daeng Ibrahim and a patrilineal descendant of Temenggong Abdul Rahman who was in turn a descendant of Sultan Abdul Jalil Shah IV, the first Sultan of Johor's Bendahara dynasty. Abu Bakar spent his childhood years in his father's kampung in Teluk Blanga; at a young age he was tutored by local teachers on Islam and Adat (traditional Malay law), before he was sent to the Teluk Blanga Malay school, a mission school run by Reverend Benjamin Peach Keasberry. Under the guidance of the missionary teachers, Abu Bakar was observed to develop the manners of an English gentleman, and the ability to speak fluent English in addition to his native Malay.

In 1851, the Temenggong delegated Abu Bakar, then eighteen-years-old, to assist him in negotiation efforts against Sultan Ali Iskandar, who was making attempts to claim sovereignty rights over Johor. As the Temenggong aged, he gradually delegated his state administrative duties to Abu Bakar. During this period, several British officers praised of Abu Bakar's excellent diplomatic skills, as mentioned in William Napier's diaries, who was the senior law agent of Singapore. Napier had accompanied Abu Bakar to fetch Tengku Teh, the mother of the deposed Sultan of Lingga, Mahmud Muzaffar Shah, to Johor shortly after her son began to exert sovereignty claims over Pahang.

The outbreak of the Pahang Civil War the following year saw Abu Bakar befriending Tun Mutahir, to whom he provided support for his war efforts. Abu Bakar married Mutahir's daughter in 1860 during a visit in Pahang, and the following year he signed a treaty of friendship, alliance and a guarantee of mutual support with Mutahir. Meanwhile, Temenggong Ibrahim was already suffering from a prolonged period of ill health, and a bout of high fever resulted in his death on 31 January 1862.

== Administration of Johor ==
=== Temenggong (1862–1868) ===
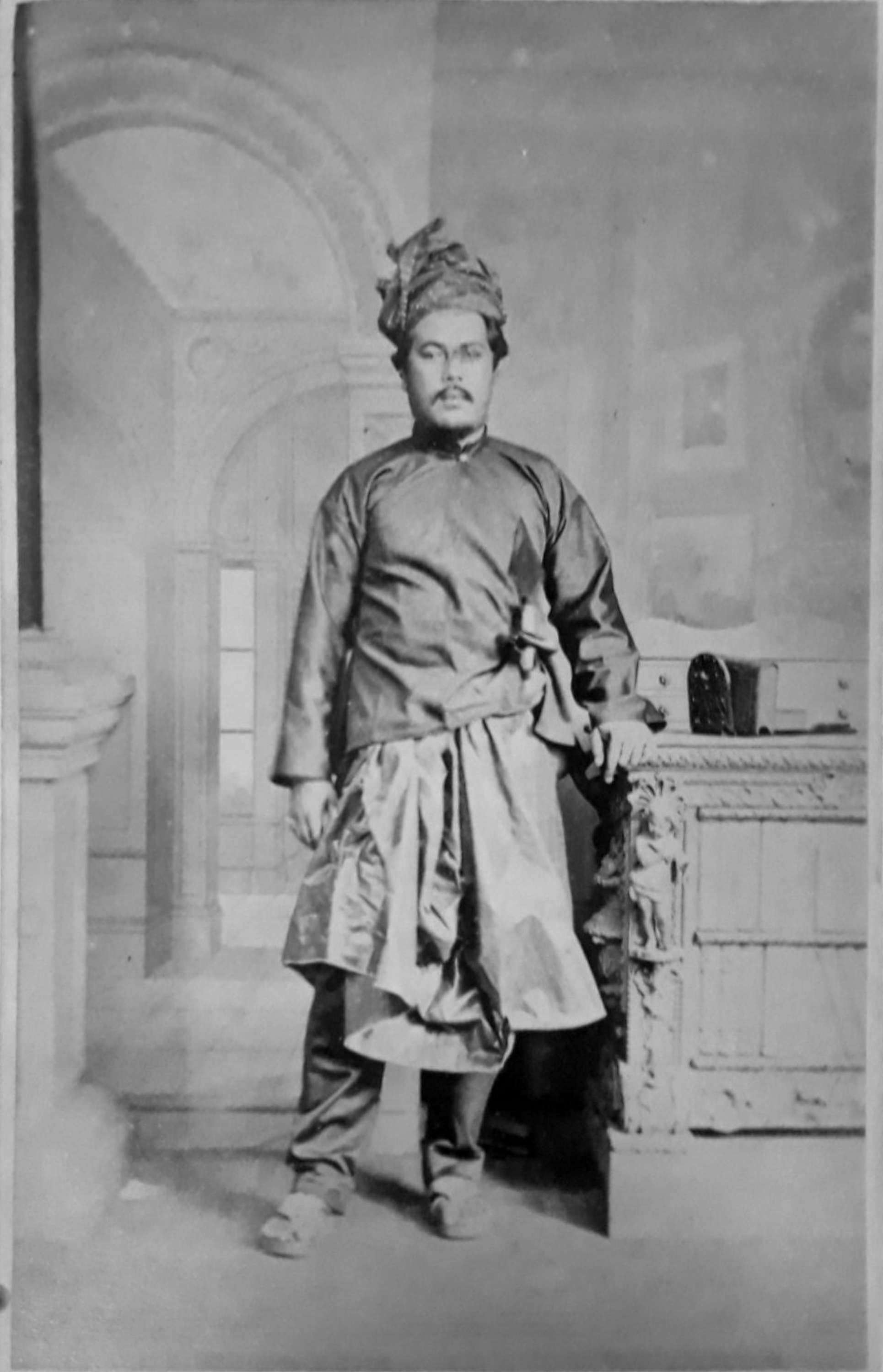
Sultan Abu Bakar while still holding the title Dato' Temenggong Abu Bakar Sri Maharajah, Rajah of Johore, circa 1862–1865

Abu Bakar assumed office as the Temenggong of Johor within three days of his father's death and moved his residence to Tyersall. At the time of his succession, Johor was facing a political threat from the deposed sultan, Mahmud Muzaffar Shah. The Sultan was pursuing his sovereignty claims over Johor and Pahang and aimed to overthrow the Sultan of Terengganu with the backing of Siam. Mahmud Muzaffar Shah established an alliance with Tun Ahmad, half-brother and rival of the Bendahara Tun Koris. The alliance caused Abu Bakar concern that the fall of Tun Koris in Pahang would threaten his own political position in Johor. Abu Bakar signed a treaty of friendship with Tun Koris in June 1862, and sent a small expeditionary force to Pahang to support Tun Koris when war broke out in August 1862.

During the first two years of his reign, Abu Bakar expanded the Kangchu system pioneered by Daeng Ibrahim. He issued Western-style contracts (termed as Surat Sungai in Malay, literally "River Documents") to the Kapitan Cina (Chinese leaders) who had established riverside plantations along the Johor River. Letters of authority (Surat Kuasa) were issued when the first Chinese leaders began settling in Johor during the 1850s. Abu Bakar quickly established good relations with the Kapitan Cina; a Malay administrator who could speak the Teochew Min (the language spoken by most Kapitan Cina) and read Chinese was employed for these purposes. He also employed the service of a Chinese contractor from Toisan, Wong Ah Fook, to oversee the construction of the Istana Besar.

Various Chinese dialect groups began to compete for commercial interests in the 1850s and 1860s. This led to communal violence. Abu Bakar and the Kapitan Cina in Johor (who were mainly migrants from Chaozhou) tried to assimilate Chinese entrepreneurs of non-Teochew origin. Abu Bakar gave official recognition and support for the Johor branch of the Ngee Ann Kongsi, which was seen as a secret society in Singapore at that time. As Johor prospered from the large revenue generated from the gambier and pepper plantations managed by the Kapitan Cina, Abu Bakar gave generous provisions to the Kapitan Cina in recognition for their contributions to Johor; among his beneficiaries was long-time family friend, Tan Hiok Nee, who was given a seat in the state council. The plantations operated relatively independently of Johor's government, and Abu Bakar was worried about the possible danger to the plantations in the event of an economic crisis. Shortly after a financial crisis broke out in Singapore in 1864, Abu Bakar imposed new regulations on these plantations, as many of them were owned by Chinese businessmen from Singapore. The Kapitan Cina and the Singapore Chamber of Commerce were particularly disturbed by the new regulations, and accused Abu Bakar of attempting to impose a trade monopoly over Johor. The British government pressured Abu Bakar to retract the regulations, which he did in January 1866. In addition, the Kapitan Cina also faced considerable difficulties in securing new agreements with Abu Bakar. The crisis was only resolved in 1866 after Abu Bakar designated five new ports for the registration of cargo, and the British softened their animosity against Abu Bakar.

Abu Bakar's relationship with the ruler of Muar, Sultan Ali Iskandar was strained. Soon after Abu Bakar succeeded his father, he sent a letter to Ali Iskandar asserting Johor's sovereignty over Segamat, which Ali Iskandar had hoped to exert political influence over. In addition, Ali Iskandar, who had borrowed a large sum from an Indian moneylender in 1860, became a source of irritation for Abu Bakar. Facing difficulties in repaying his debt, Ali Iskandar asked Abu Bakar to pay Ali's monthly pension to the moneylender; but he alternated asking for payment to himself and to the moneylender. In 1866, when the moneylender lodged a complaint with the British government, Ali Iskandar tried to borrow from Abu Bakar to repay his outstanding debts. As a result of these constant irritations, Abu Bakar persuaded the Straits Governor to sign an agreement to terminate Ali Iskandar's pension.

Abu Bakar made revisions to Johor's Islamic code in 1863, after the Sultan of Terengganu revised his state's Islamic judicial system to be more closely aligned with Sharia law. In a letter to the Straits Governor, Abu Bakar expressed hope that his revisions would suit more comfortably with European ideas. He founded an English school in Tanjung Puteri in 1864. Two years later, Abu Bakar moved the administrative headquarters to Tanjung Puteri, (Note: Tanjung Puteri was renamed Iskandar Puteri in 1855, and to Johor Bahru (the modern name) in 1866. (See Lim, Wong Ah Fook: Immigrant, Builder and Entrepreneur, pg 44.)) and officially renamed it as Johor Bahru. A new administration was set up, which was modelled after European styles and certain elements of traditional Malay government. He recruited some of his close relatives and his classmates from the Teluk Blanga Malay school into the bureaucracy, and also set up an advisory council which included two Chinese leaders. In the early 1870s, Straits Governor Sir Harry Ord said of Abu Bakar (who became a Maharaja in 1868) that he was the "only Raja in the whole peninsula or adjoining states who rules in accordance with the practice of civilized nations."

=== Maharaja (1868–1885) ===
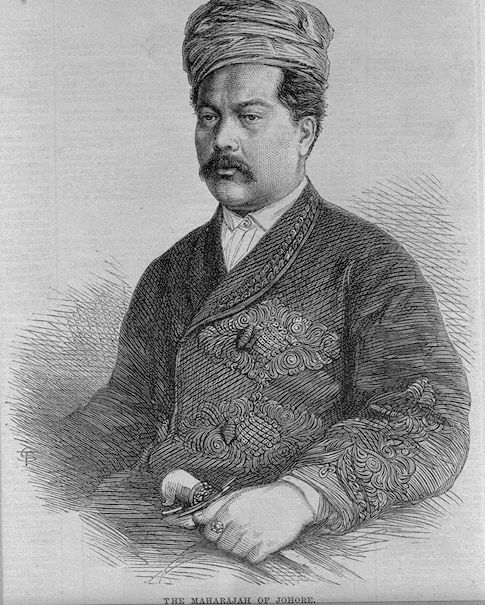
Maharaja Abu Bakar of Johor

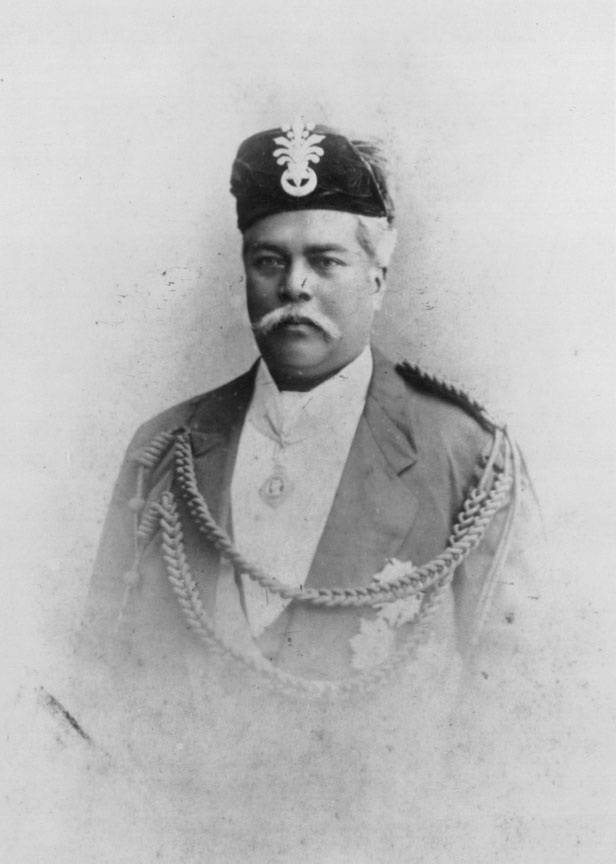
Photographic portrait of Maharaja Abu Bakar

During a state visit to England in 1866, Abu Bakar was commonly addressed as the "Maharaja" of Johor and led him to realise that the Malay title of temenggong poorly known in the Western world. He contemplated changing his title, which led him to send his cousin, Ungku Haji Muhammad and the Dato Bentara, Dato Jaafar to meet the Bugis historian, Raja Ali Haji who was residing in Riau. Raja Ali supported Abu Bakar's cause, after they did a cross examination and concluded that the past office holders had wielded actual control over the affairs of Johor, rather than the sultans of the Bendahara dynasty. In addition, questions pertaining to Abu Bakar's pursuits to clamour for recognition were also sidelined as he was able to trace his ancestry to the first sultan of the Bendahara dynasty, Sultan Abdul Jalil Shah IV by his patrilineal ancestors. The Sultan of Lingga, gave his approval for a formal recognition of Abu Bakar as the Maharaja of Johor, after Ungku Haji and Dato Jaafar travelled to Lingga and presented their claims. Abu Bakar also secured approval from the Governor of the Straits Settlements for his change in title, and was officially proclaimed as the Maharaja of Johor on 30 June 1868.

Shortly after his proclamation as maharaja, Abu Bakar laid plans for the construction of a wooden railway between Johor Bahru and Gunung Pulai after some Europeans had raised proposals to set up a retreat and sanatorium. Construction of the railway started in July 1869 and construction of the first phase was completed in 1874, which ran between Skudai and Johor Bahru. The construction project was later halted after an accident which saw a locomotive falling off the tracks as a result of termites in the wooden tracks within the Skudai portion and a shortage of funds.

In the mid-1870s, the Straits Governor, William Jervois contemplated making Maharaja Abu Bakar overlord of the chiefs in Negeri Sembilan after the British failed to quell the sectarian violence in Sungai Ujong. Abu Bakar's client, Tunku Antah was placed as the Yam Tuan of the Sri Menanti confederacy (comprising several small states within the region), and Abu Bakar was made the adviser of Negeri Sembilan (except Sungai Ujong) in 1878. Abu Bakar was believed to have had expansionist ambitions, which was suggested by his involvement in the Pahang Civil War between 1857 and 1864. A later governor, Frederick Weld, aspired for stronger British control over the Malay states and was weary of Abu Bakar's influence. The chiefs were lukewarm to the prospect of Johor's sphere of influence over Negeri Sembilan, and in 1881 Weld convinced the chiefs within the Sri Menanti confederacy to deal directly with Singapore rather than with Abu Bakar. British officers were also appointed to oversee the affairs in 1883 and 1887, and were gradually given the powers similar to that of a British Resident.

After Sultan Ali Iskandar's death in 1877, the Raja Temenggong of Muar and its village chieftains voted in favour of a merger of Muar with Johor following a succession dispute between two of Ali Iskandar sons. His oldest son, Tengku Alam Shah, disputed the legitimacy of the chieftains' wishes and staked his hereditary claims over Muar. Alam Shah instigated the 1879 Jementah Civil War in a bid to reclaim Muar, but was quickly crushed by the Maharaja's forces. During the 1880s, Abu Bakar actively encouraged the Chinese leaders to set up new gambier and pepper plantations in Muar.

Meanwhile, Weld's continued efforts to keep Abu Bakar's political influence in check and relations between Johor and Singapore became increasingly strained. Abu Bakar was reportedly said to be increasingly reluctant to accept advice from the British-appointed state lawyers, and increasingly turned to his private lawyers. Weld voiced his intent to place a Resident in Johor, which prompted Abu Bakar to make a trip to England in August 1884 to negotiate new terms with the British Colonial Office. The Assistant Under-Secretary of the Colonial Office, Robert Meade, conceded to Abu Bakar's request for an absence of a British Resident in Johor, although Abu Bakar gave an in-principle acceptance for a British adviser in Johor (though none was appointed until 1914). An agreement was drawn up, and Abu Bakar was promised control over internal affairs in exchange for British control over foreign affairs pertaining to the state.

=== Sultan (1885–1895) ===
The Bendahara of Pahang, Wan Ahmad, was proclaimed Sultan of Pahang in 1881. Abu Bakar, who was weary of the increasingly hostile political environment imposed by Weld, considered the importance of the superior moral authority that was accorded to a "sultan" than to a "maharaja". In 1885, Abu Bakar instituted the creation of a state postal and judiciary system modelled along British lines, as well as a military force, the Johor Military Forces (JMF, Malay: Askar Timbalan Setia) upon his return to Johor.

During his stay in London in late 1885, Abu Bakar expressed his desire to Meade for a formal recognition as the Sultan of Johor. He also met up with Queen Victoria, who had become a personal friend of his, within the same course of his visit. Queen Victoria consented to his wishes, and a treaty was signed on 11 December 1885 which formalised relations between Great Britain and Johor, was concluded between Abu Bakar and the Colonial Office. Abu Bakar also founded the state advisory board in London, which was intended to oversee state interests in London. Several retired officers from the Colonial Office, including William Fielding and Cecil Smith were personally appointed by Abu Bakar to oversee the board's administration.

The formal recognition of Abu Bakar by the British as the Sultan of Johor quickly drew criticisms among the Malays in Johor. A pantun circulated among the Malays in Johor, which made fun of Abu Bakar's background, became very popular. Many Malays were reluctant to accept Abu Bakar as their paramount ruler, as they were sceptical of Abu Bakar's temenggong political origins and Buginese heritage. (Note: Abu Bakar was of Malay (with distant Arab) origins from his patriline. His patrilineal great-grandfather, Temenggong Abdul Hamid, was the maternal grandson of Daeng Parani. Abdul Hamid and his descendants often used the Bugis title "Daeng" in their names. Abu Bakar's father, Ibrahim had a Buginese name: Daeng Ronggek. (See Trocki, Prince of Pirates: The Temenggongs and the Development of Johor and Singapore, 1784–1885, pg 95)) Furthermore, his affinity with Western culture did not go down well with the culturally-conservative Malay subjects of his time. A proclamation ceremony was held on 13 February 1886, where Abu Bakar made an official announcement on his adoption of the title "sultan" in place of "maharaja". In the same year on 31 July, Abu Bakar instituted the first state decorations, the Royal Family Order of Johor (Malay: Darjah Kerabat Yang Amat Dihormati) and the Order of the Crown of Johor (Malay: Seri Paduka Mahkota Johor).

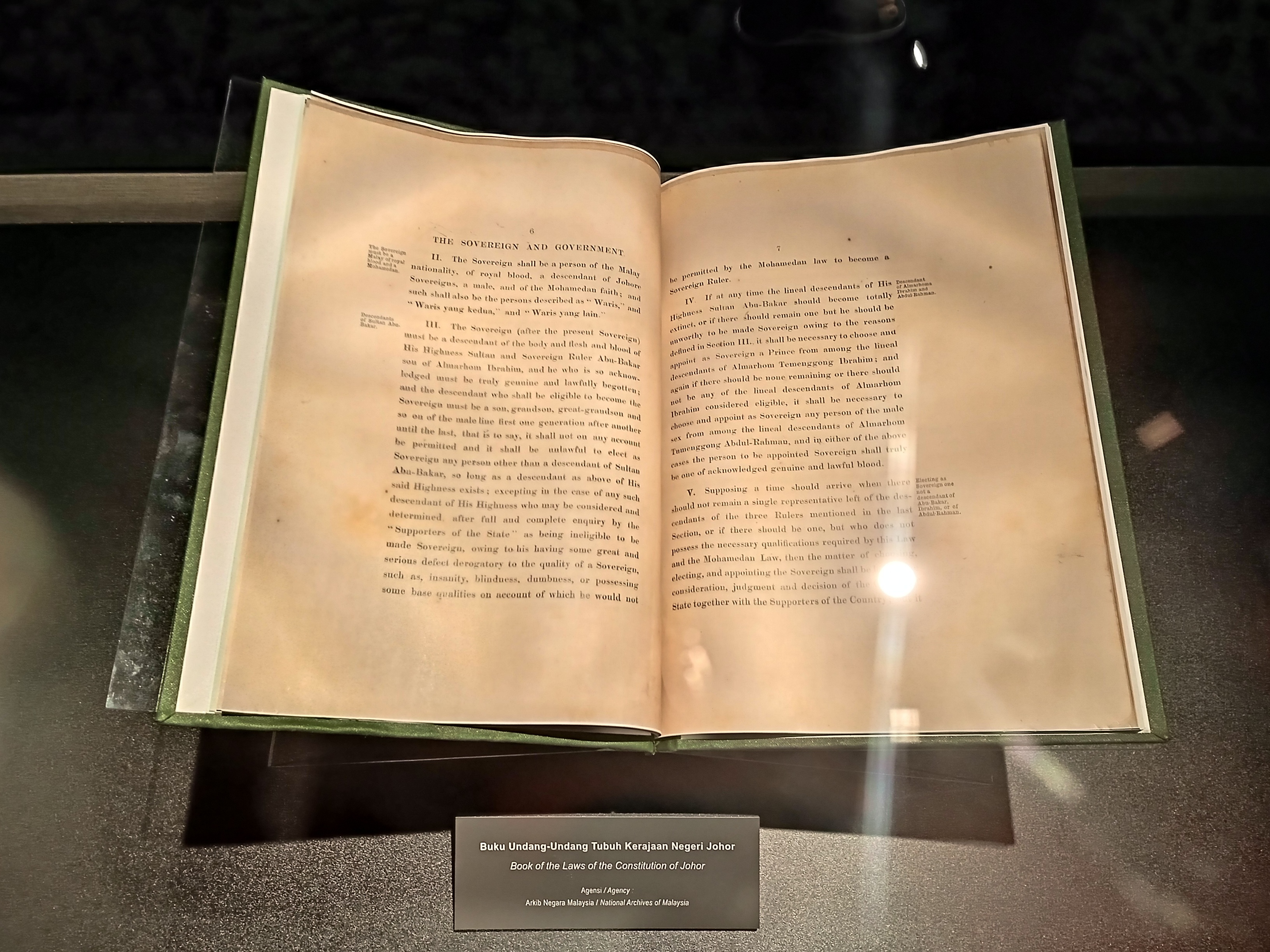
Exhibit of Undang-Undang Tubuh Kerajaan Johor

Abu Bakar employed the service of a Chinese contractor and long-time acquaintance, Wong Ah Fook, to oversee the development of Johor Bahru. The Johor Archives showed that Wong was the largest building contractor at that time and had been involved in at least twenty public works projects between 1887 and 1895. In addition, Wong was contracted to oversee the construction of the state mosque and several palaces including the Istana Tyersall under the direction of Abu Bakar. As gratitude to Wong's contributions to the state, Abu Bakar granted him a plot of land in the heart of Johor Bahru in 1892. Wong then oversaw the construction of a village, Kampong Ah Fook, as well as a road, Jalan Wong Ah Fook on the land he was granted.

Abu Bakar created the Johor State Constitution (Malay: Undang-undang Tubuh Negeri Johor), drafted by Abdul Rahman Andak, on 14 April 1895. The state's constitution was seen as a turning point by many as a step in laying the groundwork for the administration of Johor. It was suggested that Abu Bakar, who was fearful of his possible imminent death in light of his failing health, created the state constitution with the intent of preserving the state's independence in the light of growing British political influence in the Malay states.

== Foreign relations ==
=== Great Britain ===
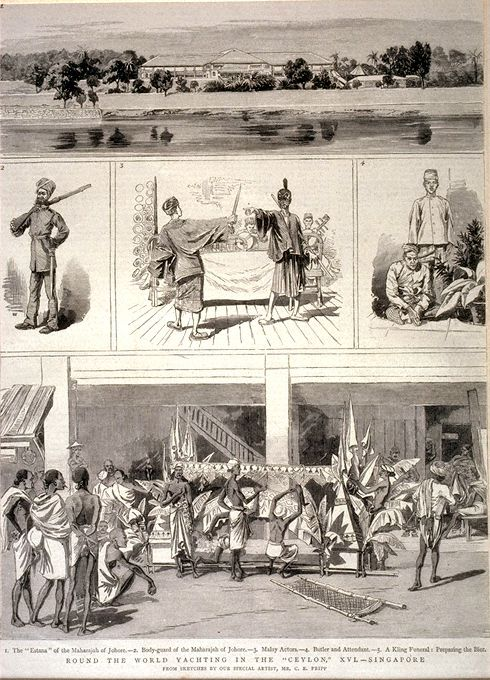
Illustration of activities in Istana Besar in 1882.

Abu Bakar made his inaugural state visit while he was still a temenggong. He toured England in 1866 with Dato' Jaafar, and met with members of the English royalty, notably Queen Victoria and the Prince of Wales, Prince Edward. The Queen conferred Abu Bakar with the Knight Commander of the Order of the Star of India (KCSI), which he valued highly. The trip reportedly gave both Abu Bakar and Dato' Jaafar lasting memories of England, and inspired Abu Bakar to develop Johor along British lines. Nine years later, Abu Bakar travelled to Calcutta to meet up with Prince Edward who was then spending his time in the city. The following year, Prince Edward conferred Abu Bakar the Prince of Wales's gold medal. He made another trip to London in 1878, where he was invited to attend the State Ball at Buckingham Palace. Abu Bakar's palaces were modelled closely along British lines; when Prince George and Prince Albert Victor visited Johor in the 1880s, they had commented that the huge drawing room of Abu Bakar's palace closely resembled the state-rooms found at Windsor Castle. He was also an avid polo player, and had raced with the princes during their state visits to Johor. The Duke of Sutherland also praised Abu Bakar's hospitality during his state visit after he became sultan, and had reportedly enjoyed the Malay cuisine which the Abu Bakar had served to him.

In particular, Queen Victoria became a close friend of Abu Bakar especially during his later years. During a visit to England in February 1891, Abu Bakar was personally received by the Queen, and was invited to dine and stay with the Queen at Windsor Castle. Queen Victoria held Abu Bakar in very high esteem, which she had signed herself off as an "affectionate friend" in a letter to Abu Bakar in March 1891. Reportedly, Queen Victoria was quoted to have highly valued the silver model Albert Memorial which Abu Bakar sent to her during her Golden Jubilee in 1887. Shortly before his death in May 1895, Queen Victoria sent her personal physician to attend to Abu Bakar's medical needs, who was by then very ill when he arrived in London.

=== Other countries ===
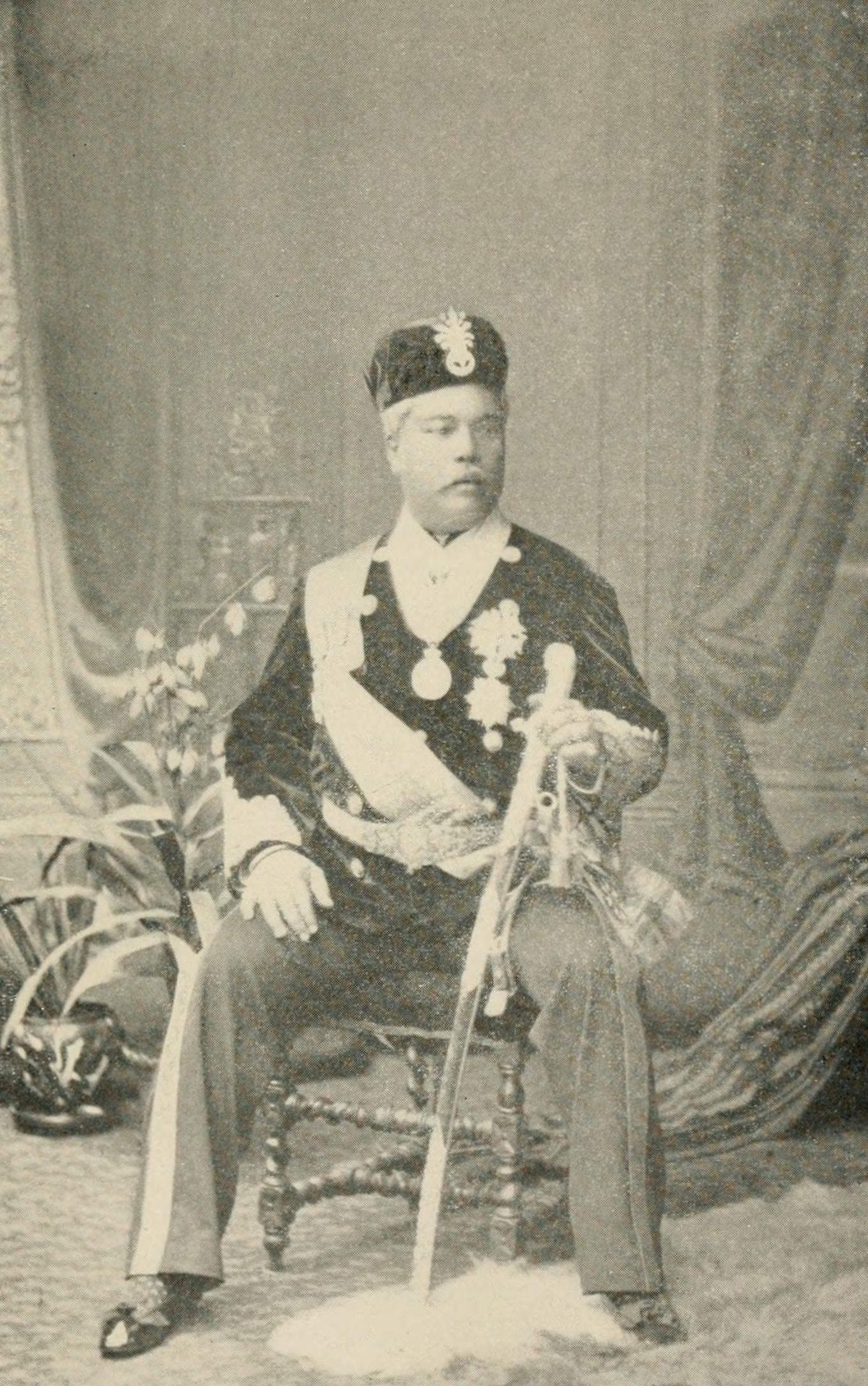
Sultan Abu Bakar during his royal tour

Abu Bakar visited Ottoman Turkey during his European tour in 1866, where he met Sultan Abdülaziz who presented him with Ruggyyah Hanum, a Circassian princess as a gift. Ruggyyah Hanum married Ungku Abdul Majid, Abu Bakar's brother after she arrived in Johor. After Ungku Majid's untimely death, Ruggyyah Hanum was later remarried to Dato Jaafar (who had accompanied Abu Bakar during his 1866 trip). During his second visit to England in August 1878, Abu Bakar wrote to Colonel Anson from South Kensington of his wishes to visit European royalty in Paris, Vienna and Italy. He managed to visit Paris and Vienna, and was even given a warm reception by Prince Henry of Liechtenstein before returning to Johor. Three years later, he visited Prussia, where he was conferred the Royal Prussian Order of the Crown. He made two separate European tours in 1891 and 1893 with a personal physician by his side, during which he met Emperor Francis Joseph, King Umberto, Pope Leo XIII and Sultan Abdul Hamid II, and was conferred the awards of Commander of the Cross of Italy, Imperial Order of the Osmans (Turkey) and the Commander of the Cross of Saxe-Coburg and Gotha.

In 1881, Abu Bakar also visited Java, which was under Dutch rule. In the same year, he received the visiting King Kalākaua during his tour around the world and was conferred the Grand Cross of the Order of Kalakaua I of Hawaii along with his State Secretary, Muhammad Salleh. Kalākaua wrote to his sister Liliʻuokalani fondly on this interaction which revealed a shared interest in lineage and culture between them, saying that Abu Bakar's likeness reminding of Leleiohoku I. On 10 December 1892 at Istana Tyersall, Tyersall, Singapore, the Emperor of China, Guangxu, conveyed by the Consul General in Singapore, bestowed upon him the First Class of the First Grade Order of the Double Dragon for his just treatment of the Chinese in Johor, witnessed by a gathering of Chinese businesspeople.

== Family ==
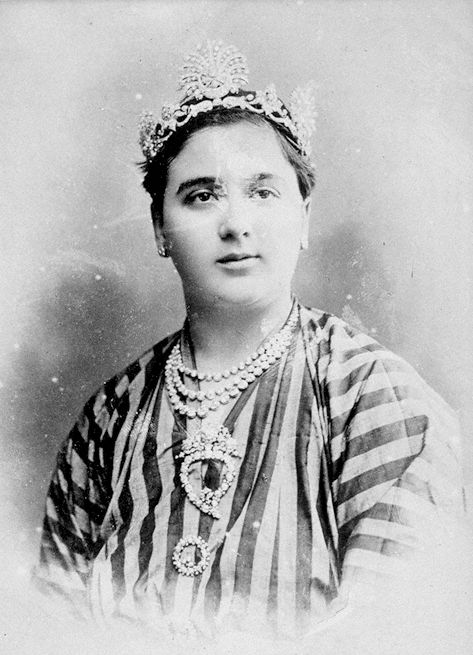
Fourth wife of Sultan Abu Bakar: Khadijah Khanum

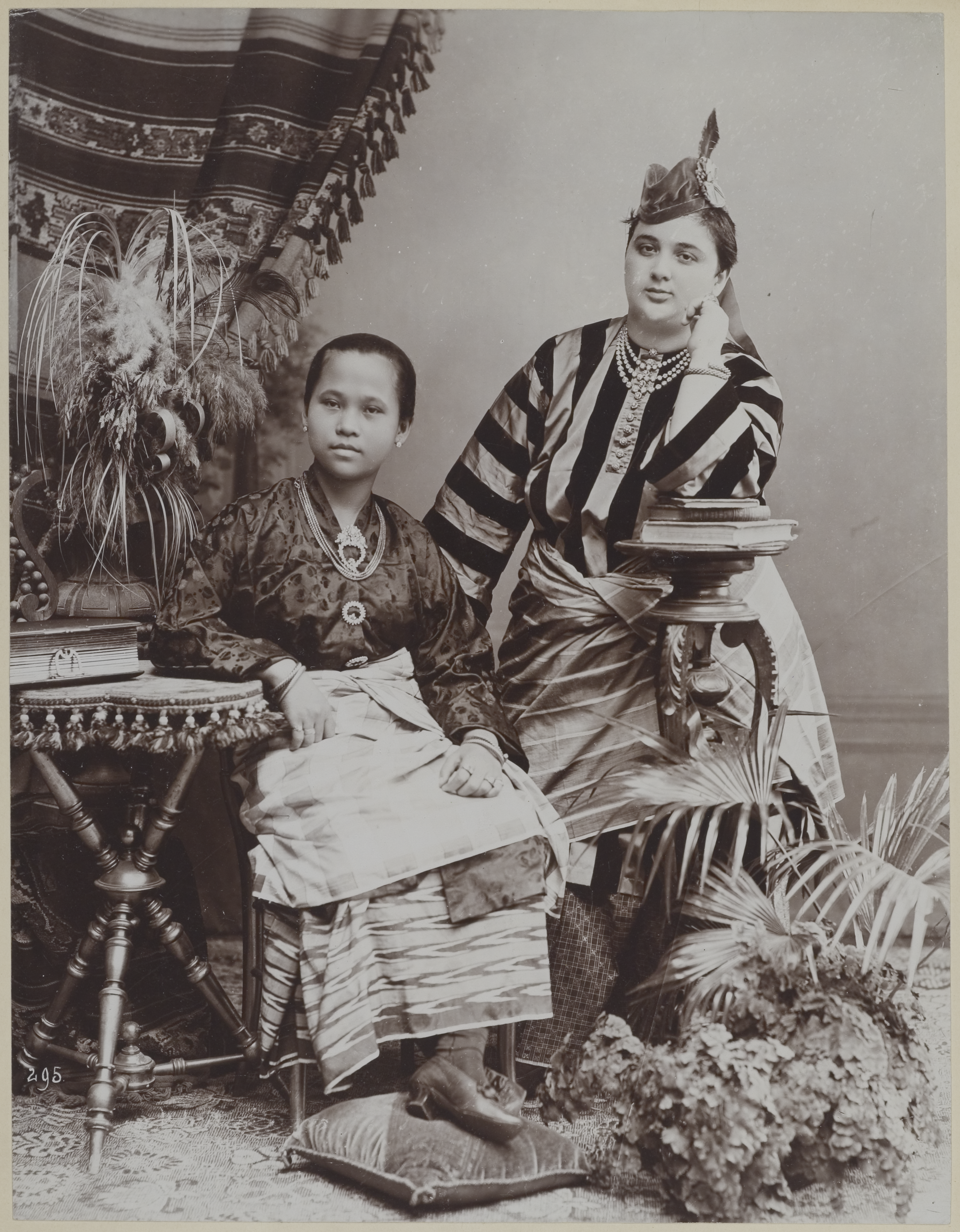
Sultan Abu Bakar's fourth wife: Khadijah Khanum in the company of an unknown lady

Abu Bakar married his first wife, Engku Chik during his stay in Pahang in 1857. Abu Bakar was related to Engku Chik by family ties; Engku Chik was the sister of Tun Koris, who was also a brother-in-law to Abu Bakar. Abu Bakar had a daughter with Engku Chik, Tunku Besar Putri. He also had a son, Tunku Ibrahim, and a daughter, Tunku Mariam with his second wife Cecilia Catherina Lange, who was the daughter of a Danish trader, Mads Johansen Lange and his Chinese wife Nonna Sangnio. Lange met Abu Bakar while she was in Singapore, and adopted the Muslim name of "Zubaidah" after her marriage to Abu Bakar in 1870. In 1885, Abu Bakar married a Chinese woman of Cantonese heritage, Wong Ah Gew, with whom he had a daughter, Tunku Azizah. Wong took on the Muslim name of "Fatimah" at her marriage to Abu Bakar, and was crowned the Sultanah in July 1886. Abu Bakar held Wong in very high esteem, who became Abu Bakar's confidant pertaining to his involvement in state affairs. Wong became a close friend of Abu Bakar's building contractor, Wong Ah Fook as they shared a common surname and dialect group. Wong died in 1891. During his state visit to the Ottoman Empire in September 1893, Abu Bakar married his fourth wife, Khadijah Khanum, who was of Circassian heritage. (Khadijah's sister, Rugayah, became the wife of Abu Bakar's brother and later the wife of the first Menteri Besar of Johor, Dato' Jaafar). He had a daughter, Tunku Fatimah with Khadijah the following February, who was later crowned as the Sultanah of Johor.

== Death ==
In early May 1895, Abu Bakar travelled to London together with his son and successor, Tunku Ibrahim (later Sultan Ibrahim) with the hope to mustering support and recognition of his rule. He was by then already very ill and was already suffering from an inflammation of the kidneys for sometime and diagnosed with Bright's disease. At the onstart of the voyage in early May, he became very weak, and had to be carried aboard a ship in a wheelchair. He reached London on 10 May, and checked into Bailey's Hotel but was bedridden throughout his remaining days. He was not allowed to receive many visitors, though the Duke of Connaught and Strathearn, Prince Arthur paid two visits. Queen Victoria sent her personal physician, Douglas Powell to attend to his medical needs upon receiving news of his illness.

Abu Bakar contracted pneumonia during his stay in the hotel, which led to his death on the evening of 4 June 1895. His body was then brought back to Johor by an English man-of-war from Penang. A state funeral was given to Abu Bakar, and he was laid to rest at the royal mausoleum at Makam Mahmoodiah on 7 September 1895. His son, Tunku Ibrahim was later installed as the Sultan of Johor in November 1895.

== Legacy ==
Abu Bakar was often credited as the "Founder of Modern Johor" (Malay: Bapa Pemodenan Johor). He established a Western-styled bureaucratic system and civil service, and consolidated the state's agricultural economy, which consisted of gambier and pepper plantations headed by Chinese leaders, known as "Kangchu" in Teochew Min. The gambier and pepper plantations were first introduced during the 1840s by Chinese immigrants. Often, Abu Bakar was called in by Malay rulers from neighbouring states to provide advice in the event when the rulers had to make important decisions. In particular, he became a close confidante of the Sultan of Pahang, Wan Ahmad in 1887, with whom Abu Bakar had persuaded Sultan Ahmad to accept a British consultant instead of a Resident. The Colonial Government at that time was seeking for greater control over the Malay States and was making aggressive attempts to impose British Residents into the Malay states. The Colonial Government also made a failed attempt to impose a British Resident in Johor in 1885; the state maintained its independence in its internal affairs until 1914.

Abu Bakar was also the first Malay ruler to visit Europe in 1866. He was an Anglophile, and mingled comfortably with the Europeans. The British governor, Sir Harry Ord had once written to the Secretary of State of Great Britain and described Abu Bakar as an "English gentleman" in his tastes and habits. Abu Bakar had gained his share of critics, especially among the more conservative Malay scholars who were critical of his Western tastes. Abu Bakar's penchant for an extravagant lifestyle and foreign travel resulted in a depleted state treasury at the time of his death in 1895. At least one scholar, Nesalmar Nadarajah, had suggested that Johor's loss of independence in the early 20th century was attributed to this depleted state treasury. In addition, Nadarajah also believed that the loss of Johor's independence was also attributed to Abu Bakar's failure of giving attention to his young son, Tunku Ibrahim, who lacked proper education and training in the art of state administration and diplomacy when he succeeded his father as the Sultan of Johor in his early twenties.

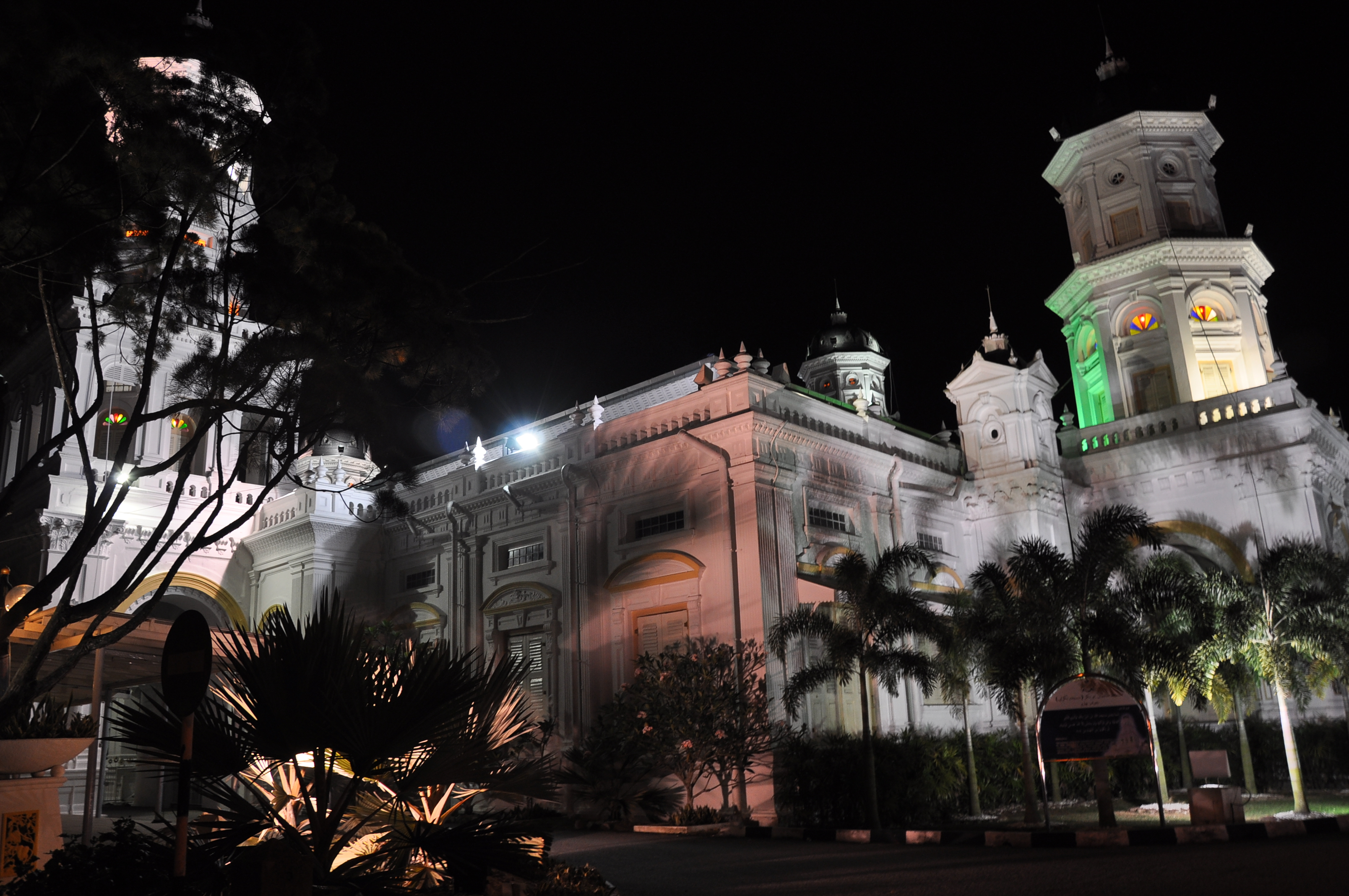
The Sultan Abu Bakar State Mosque at night.

Many state's buildings which were constructed during Abu Bakar's reign were modelled after British Victorian and Moorish architectural styles. Abu Bakar placed the construction of these state buildings under close supervision, and was often called in to lay the foundation stones of these buildings personally. A few of these buildings were named after Abu Bakar himself, notably the Sultan Abu Bakar State Mosque (Malay: Masjid Negeri Sultan Abu Bakar), which was built between 1892 and 1900.

== Foreign honours ==
- Austria-Hungary: Grand Cross of the Order of Franz Joseph (1893)
- Qing Dynasty: Imperial Order of the Double Dragon, 1st Class, 1st Grade of the Chinese Empire (1892)
- Kingdom of Hawaii: Grand Cross of the Royal Order of Kalākaua (1881)
- British Raj: Knight Commander of the Order of the Star of India (KCSI) (17 September 1866)
- Italy: Commander of the Order of the Crown of Italy (1891)
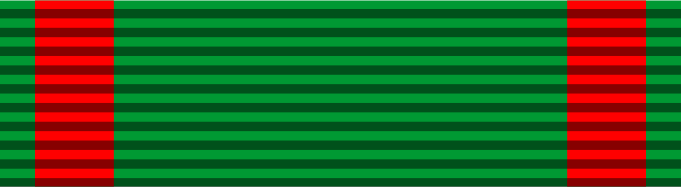
- Ottoman Empire: 1st Class of the Imperial Order of Osminieh (Nishan-e-Osmanieh) (1893)
- Prussia: 1st Class of the Order of the Crown (23 June 1880)
- Saxony: Grand Cross of the Ducal Saxe-Ernestine House Order – 1893
- United Kingdom:
  - Prince of Wales's Gold Medal – 1876
  - Knight Grand Cross of the Order of St Michael and St George (GCMG) - Sir (20 March 1876)

== Bibliography ==
- A. Trocki, Carl (2007), Prince of Pirates: The Temenggongs and the Development of Johor and Singapore 1784–1885, NUS Press, p. 130, ISBN 978-9971-69-376-3
- Andaya, Barbara Watson, A History of Malaysia, Palgrave Macmillan, 1984, ISBN 0-312-38121-2
- Braginsky, Vladimir, Murtagh, Ben, Harrison, Rachel (FRW), The Portrayal of Foreigners in Indonesian and Malay literatures, Edwin Mellen Press, 2007, ISBN 0-7734-5365-2
- Buckley, Charles Burton, An Anecdotal History of Old Times in Singapore, from the Foundation of the Settlement Under the Honourable the East India Company, on 6 February 1819, to the Transfer to the Colonial Office as Part of the Colonial Possessions of the Crown on 1 April 1867, Fraser & Neave, 1902
- Dewan Bahasa dan Pustaka, Kementerian Pelajaran, Dewan Sastera, 2000
- Freitag, Ulrike, Indian Ocean Migrants and State Formation in Hadhramaut: Reforming the Homeland, BRILL, 2003, ISBN 90-04-12850-6
- Hack, Karl, Rettig, Tobias, Colonial armies in Southeast Asia, Routledge, 2006, ISBN 0-415-33413-6
- Hanna, William Anderson, Bali Profile, American Universities Field Staff, 1976, ISBN 0-910116-98-9
- Hooker, Virginia Matheson, A Short History of Malaysia, Allen & Unwin, 2003, ISBN 1-86448-955-3
- Lim, Pui Huen, Wong Ah Fook: Immigrant, Builder and Entrepreneur, Times Edition, 2002, ISBN 981-232-369-4
- Jessy, Joginder Singh, History of Malaya (1400–1959): 1400–1959, United Publishers and Peninsular Publications, 1961
- Mehmet, Ozay, Islamic Identity and Development, Routledge, 1990, ISBN 0-415-04386-7
- Miller, Harry, A Short History of Malaysia, F.A. Praeger, 1966
- Milne, Robert Stephen, Mauzy, Diane K., Malaysian Politics Under Mahathir, Routledge, 1999, ISBN 0-415-17143-1
- Milner, Anthony Charles, The Invention of Politics in Colonial Malaya, Cambridge University Press, 2002, ISBN 0-521-00356-3
- Nadarajah, Nesalamar, Johore and the Origins of British Control, 1895–1914, Arenabuku, 2000, ISBN 967-970-318-5
- Noor, F.A., The Other Malaysia: Writings on Malaysia's Subaltern History, Silverfishbooks, 2002, ISBN 983-40816-3-4
- Reece, R.H.W, The Name of Brooke: The End of White Rajah Rule in Sarawak, Oxford University Press, 1982, ISBN 0-19-580474-0
- Royal Asiatic Society of Great Britain and Ireland. Malaysian Branch, Journal of the Malaysian Branch of the Royal Asiatic Society, 1966
- Schimmel, Annemarie, Islamic Names, Edinburgh University Press, 1989, ISBN 0-85224-563-7
- Singh, Damodar, History of Temples Abroad and in India, All India Gurdwara Schools Institution
- Tarling, Nicholas, Imperialism in Southeast Asia: A Fleeting, Passing Phase, Routledge, 2001, ISBN 0-415-23289-9
- Tate, D.J.M, Gulrose, Kassim, Information Malaysia (2005), Berita publications
- Tregonning K.G, A History of Modern Malaya, University of London Press, 1964
- Trocki, Carl A., Prince of Pirates: The Temenggongs and the Development of Johor and Singapore, 1784–1885, Singapore University Press, 1979
- (Tun) Suzana (Tun) Othman, Institusi Bendahara; Permata Melayu yang hilang: Dinasti Bendahara Johor-Pahang, 2002, ISBN 983-40566-6-4
- Turnbull, Constance Mary, The Straits Settlements, 1826–67: Indian Presidency to Crown Colony, Athlone Press, 1972, ISBN 0-485-13132-3
- Werlich, Robert, Orders and Decorations of all Nations: Ancient and Modern, Civil and Military, Quaker Press, 1965
- Winstedt, R. O, A History of Johore (1365–1941), (M.B.R.A.S. Reprints, 6.) Kuala Lumpur: Malaysian Branch of the Royal Asiatic Society, 1992, ISBN 983-99614-6-2
- Withington, Antoinette, The Golden Cloak, Honolulu Star-Bulletin, 1953
- Kayadibi, Saim. "Ottoman Connections to the Malay World: Islam, Law and Society” (Kuala Lumpur: The Other Press, 2011) ISBN 978-983-9541-77-9.
- T. Wignesan, "A Peranakan's View of the fin de siècle monde malais – Na Tian Piet's Endearing syair of Epic Proportions" [partial tranls. with introduction and notes to Na Tian Piet's "Sha'er of the late Sultan Abu Bakar (of Johor)"]in The Gombak Review, Vol. 4, N° 2 (International Islamic University Malaysia), Kuala Lumpur, 1999, pp. 101–121. Cf. also: T. Wignesan. Sporadic Striving amid Echoed Voices, Mirrored Images and Stereotypic Posturing in Malaysian-Singaporean Literatures. Allahabad: Cyberwit.net, 2008, pp. 196–218. ISBN 978-81-8253-120-8

Cf. http://www.stateless.freehosting.net/TTianPiet.htm Archived 12 March 2017 at the Wayback Machine

Regnal titles
Preceded by Daeng Ibrahim	Temenggong of Johor; 1862–1868	Succeeded by (post abolished); Succession title: Maharaja of Johor (1868–1886)
Preceded by Daeng Ibrahim; Maharaja of Johor (de facto)	Maharaja of Johor; 1868–1886	Succeeded by (post abolished); Succession title: Sultan of Johor (1886 onwards)
Preceded by Sultan Ali	Sultan of Johor; 1886–1895	Succeeded by Sultan Ibrahim
