= List of places named after Abu Bakar of Johor =

Several places are named in honour of the 21st Sultan of Johor, Sultan Abu Bakar who administered the state between 1862 and 1886 before being proclaimed Sultan in 1886 and reigned until his death in 1895. A good number of places named after him are buildings, although a few of them take the form of roads.

== Buildings ==
=== Johor Bahru ===
- Maktab Sultan Abu Bakar (formerly known as English College)
- Masjid Negeri Sultan Abu Bakar (English: Sultan Abu Bakar State Mosque)
- Muzium Diraja Abu Bakar (English: Royal Abu Bakar Museum, consisting of the entire Istana Besar itself)
- Kompleks Sultan Abu Bakar, the Malaysian checkpoint complex along the Malaysia–Singapore Second Link
- Sekolah Kebangsaan Kompleks Sultan Abu Bakar, Gelang Patah

=== Muar ===
- Bangunan Sultan Abu Bakar
- Sekolah Menengah Kebangsaan Perempuan Sultan Abu Bakar, a girls' school in Muar

== Roads ==
- Jalan Sultan Abu Bakar, Johor Bahru
