= House of Temenggong =

Malaysian dynasty

House of Temenggong Wangsa Temenggung: وڠسا تمڠݢوڠ; Temenggong dynasty
- Royal house
- Parent family: House of Bendahara
- Country: Malaysia
- Current region: Johor
- Origin: Johor, Malaya
- Founded: 13 February 1886; 140 years ago
- Founder: Abu Bakar of Johor
- Current head: Ibrahim Iskandar of Johor
- Seat: Istana Bukit Serene
- Historic seat: Istana Besar
- Titles: King of Malaysia; Queen of Malaysia; Sultan of Johor; Regent of Johor; Crown Prince of Johor; Deputy Crown Prince of Johor
- Website: royal.johor.my

The House of Temenggong (Malay: Wangsa Temenggung), or the Temenggong dynasty, is the current ruling dynasty of Johor, Malaysia.

== Background ==
The term "Temenggong" historically referred to a high-ranking minister responsible for raising armies, ensuring the monarch's personal safety and overseeing state security forces. In 19th-century Johor, however, the office took on a different trajectory when Temenggong Daeng Ibrahim, leveraging a strategic alliance with the British, effectively sidelined the traditional royal line of the House of Bendahara and usurped political authority.

Although Sultan Hussein and his son Sultan Ali nominally ruled between 1819 and 1855, their authority was purely ceremonial. The British de jure recognised their titles largely for diplomatic convenience while the actual administration of the territory was eroded. Stripped of real power, the original royals were eventually sidelined and exiled to Istana Kampong Glam in Singapore, leaving descendants of this original line to persist today as a separate branch distinct from the reigning dynasty. Ultimately, true political and economic control fell squarely into the hands of Daeng Ibrahim and colonial administrators, paving the way for indirect rule across the Malay Peninsula as part of the expanding footprint of British Malaya.

Despite its non-royal origins, the House of Temenggong successfully usurped power by marginalising the established dynasty through British cooperation and economic leverage. Daeng Ibrahim strengthened his position by controlling vital trade routes and developing plantations, aligning his interests with those of the British. In 1855, a British-endorsed agreement forced Sultan Ali to cede political control to the Temenggong in exchange for a pension and a keep in Kesang. This de-established the traditional sultanate's relevance, allowing Daeng Ibrahim to rule as the de facto sovereign without assuming the formal title of sultan.

The consolidation of this new dynasty was completed by Daeng Ibrahim's son, Abu Bakar, who succeeded him in 1862. With British permission, he changed his title of temenggong to "maharaja" in 1868 and finally "sultan" in 1886, eventually becoming the first ruler of the modern House of Temenggong. As such, he established the foundation for the current monarchy, which continues today under Sultan Ibrahim Iskandar of Johor.

== Heads of the House of Temenggong ==
No	Head of the House of Temenggong	Reign	Notes
1	Abu Bakar al-Khalil	13 February 1886 – 4 June 1895	
2	Ibrahim al-Masyhur	7 September 1895 – 8 May 1959	
3	Ismail al-Khalidi	8 May 1959 – 10 May 1981	
4	Iskandar al-Mutawakkil Alallah	11 May 1981 – 22 January 2010	
5	Ibrahim Ismail	23 January 2010 – present	
