= Mahmud Muzaffar Shah =

Mahmud Muzaffar Shah (b. c. 1823, Terengganu – d. July 1864, Pahang), was the third Sultan of Riau-Lingga Sultanate (archipelagoes south of Singapore), whose deposition cleared the way for Dutch colonial control.

Mahmud was crowned sultan in 1834, and when the regency of his father, Sultan Muhammad II Muazzam Shah ended in 1841, he resolved to restore the power wielded by his predecessors. He had the tacit support of the east coast Malay states to the north and particularly of Sultan Omar Riayat Shah of Terengganu. Mahmud’s claim to the throne of the Malay state of Pahang seemed to threatened the Dutch, however, and they deposed him in October 1857. Mahmud retained immense prestige among east coast Malays, and his efforts to win Malay and Thai support for his Pahang claim, although fruitless, provided occasions for further Dutch and British involvement in Malay affairs.
