= 1936 Birthday Honours =

British government recognitions

The King's Birthday Honours 1936 were appointments in many of the Commonwealth realms of King Edward VIII to various orders and honours to reward and highlight good works by citizens of those countries. The appointments were made to celebrate the official birthday of The King. They were published on 19 June 1936.

The recipients of honours are displayed here as they were styled before their new honour, and arranged by honour, with classes (Knight, Knight Grand Cross, etc.) and then divisions (Military, Civil, etc.) as appropriate.

== United Kingdom and Colonies ==
=== Viscount ===
- Bertrand Edward, Baron Dawson of Penn, GCVO KCB KCMG FRCP.

=== Baron ===
- Sir Herbert Austin, KBE MIMechE JP, Chairman of Austin Motor Company Ltd. For public services.
- Sir Henry Strother Cautley, Bt KC MP, Member of Parliament for East Grinstead since January 1910, and for East Leeds, 1900-06. For political and public services.
- Sir (William) Malcolm Hailey, GCSI GCIE DLitt DLaws, lately Governor of the United Provinces of Agra and Oudh.
- John William Beaumont Pease, JP, Chairman of Lloyds Bank Ltd. and of the Bank of London and South America.

=== Privy Councillor ===
- Herbrand Edward Dundonald Brassey, Earl De La Warr, Parliamentary Under-Secretary of State for War, 1929–30, Parliamentary Secretary, Ministry of Agriculture, and Deputy Minister of Fisheries, 1930–33, Parliamentary Secretary, Board of Education since 1935.
- Lieutenant-Colonel David John Colville, TD DL MP, Member of Parliament for North Midlothian since 1929. Parliamentary Secretary to the Department of Overseas Trade, 1931-35. Parliamentary Under-Secretary of State for Scotland since 1935.
- Captain David Euan Wallace, MC MP, Member of Parliament for Hornsey since 1924, and for Rugby, 1922-23. Parliamentary Secretary to the Department of Overseas Trade since November 1935; Parliamentary Under-Secretary of State, Home Office, 1935; Civil Lord of the Admiralty, 1931–35; Assistant Government Whip, 1928–29; Lord Commissioner of HM Treasury, 1929 and 1931.

=== Baronet ===
- William Francis Stratford Dugdale, JP DL. For public services in Warwickshire.
- Captain Sidney Herbert, MP, Member of Parliament for Scarborough and Whitby, 1922–31 and for the Abbey Division of Westminster since July 1932. For political and public services.
- Colonel Sidney Cornwallis Peel, CB DSO TD DL, Chairman of the Advisory Committee, Export Credits Guarantee Department.
- Lieutenant-Colonel Henry Kenyon Stephenson, DSO VD DL . For political and public services in Sheffield.
- Colonel Sir Albert Edward Whitaker, CBE TD JP DL. For political and public services in Nottinghamshire.

=== Knight Bachelor ===
- Irving James Albery, MC MP, Member of Parliament for Gravesend since 1924. For political and public services.
- William MacDonald Baird, JP. for political and public services in Scotland.
- Alderman John Bedford Burman, JP. For political and public services in Birmingham.
- Major George Frederick Davies, JP MP, Member of Parliament for the Yeovil division since October 1923. Vice-Chamberlain to HM Household since December, 1935. Assistant Government Whip, 1931–32, and a Lord Commissioner of HM Treasury, 1932-35.
- Edward Guy Dawber, RA FSA FRIBA, Architect. Vice-President and Chairman of the Council for the Preservation of Rural England.
- Hugh Garrard Tyrwhitt-Drake, JP. For political and public services in the County of Kent.
- Alfred Dyer, JP. for political and public services in Hastings.
- Ernest Julian Foley, CB, Under-Secretary, Board of Trade.
- George Henry Gater, CMG DSO JP, Clerk of the London County Council.
- Herbert Nigel Gresley, CBE DSc MInstCE MIMechE MIEE, Chief Mechanical Engineer, London and North Eastern Railway.
- Herbert John Clifford Grierson, MA LLD LittD FBA, lately Regius Professor of Rhetoric and English Literature, Edinburgh University.
- Frederic Howard Hamilton. For political and public services in South-West England.
- Charles Malcolm Barclay-Harvey, JP MP, Member, of Parliament for Kincardine and Western Division, December 1923 to May 1929, and since October 1931. For political and public services.
- George Harvey, MP, Member of Parliament for the Kennington division of Lambeth, October 1924 to May 1929, and since October 1931. For political and public services.
- Colonel Alfred Edward Webb-Johnson, CBE DSO TD MB ChB FRCS, Surgeon to the Middlesex Hospital.
- Judge Stanley Anthony Hill Kelly, County Court Judge.
- Councillor William Edwin Manchester, JP. For political and public services in Islington.
- Gilbert Thomas Morgan, OBE DSc LLD FIC FRS, Director of Chemical Research, Department of Scientific and Industrial Research.
- James Morton,. For services to the dye and colour industries.
- William Newzam Prior Nicholson, Painter. Trustee of the Tate Gallery, Millbank.
- Charles Phibbs. For political and public services in Merionethshire.
- David Charles Roberts, LLD JP. For public services in Wales.
- David Carter Rutherford, JP. for public services in Hertfordshire.
- Albert Charles Seward, MA ScD DSc LLD FRS, Professor of Botany, Cambridge University, and Master of Downing College.
- Alderman Harry Speakman, JP. For political and public services in Leigh, Lancashire.
- Alfred St. Valery Tebbitt. For services to the Hertford British Hospital in Paris.
- Lieutenant-Colonel William Thomlinson, JP DL. For political and public services in the County of Durham.
- Frederick Joseph West, CBE MInstCE MIMechE, JP. For public services in Manchester.
- James Grey West, OBE FRIBA, Chief Architect, HM Office of Works and Public Buildings.

Dominions

- Francis Anderson, MA LLD, Emeritus Professor of Philosophy at the University of Sydney. For educational and social welfare services in the State of New South Wales.
- Lieutenant-Colonel Charles Bickerton Blackburn, OBE MD ChM, Australian Army Medical Corps Reserve, Member of the Council of the New South Wales Branch of the British Medical Association.
- James Sands Elliott, MB ChB FRACS. For public services in the Dominion of New Zealand.
- Cedric Stanton Hicks, MSc MB ChB PhD FIC, Professor of Human Physiology and Pharmacology at the University of Adelaide in the State of South Australia. For services to medical education.
- Richard Linton, Agent General in London for the State of Victoria.
- Captain Hibbert Alan Stephen Newton, MB MS FRCS, Australian Army Medical Corps Reserve, Member of the Council, and Censor in Chief, Royal Australasian College of Surgeons.
- John Ranken Reed, CBE, Senior Judge of the Supreme Court, and Acting Chief Justice, Dominion of New Zealand.

India

- Ernest Handforth Goodman Roberts, Barrister-at-Law, Chief Justice of the High Court of Judicature at Rangoon, Burma.
- John Rolleston Lort-Williams, KC, Judge of the High Court of Judicature at Fort William in Bengal.
- Raja Raghunandan Prashad Singh, of Monghyr, Member of the Council of State, Zamindar and Banker, Monghyr, Bihar.
- Major-General Cuthbert Allan Sprawson, CIE MD FRCP DLitt KHP, Indian Medical Service, Director-General, Indian Medical Service.
- Robert Daniel Richmond, CIE, Chairman, Madras Services Commission, Madras.
- Rajkumar Vijaya Ananda Gajapatiraj, of Vizianagram, Member of the Legislative Assembly.
- Major Nawab Ahmad Nawaz Khan, CIE OBE, Member of the Legislative Assembly, of Dera Ismail Khan, North-West Frontier Province.
- Charles Carter Chitham, CIE, Indian Police, Inspector-General of Police, Central Provinces.
- Haji Khan Bahadur Nawab Muhammad Jamal Khan, Leghari, Member of the Punjab Legislative Council, Tumandar of the Leghari Tribe, Dera Ghazi Khan, Punjab.
- Henry Tristram Holland, CIE MB FRCS, Church Missionary Society, Quetta, Baluchistan.
- Ishvardas Lakhmidas, JP, Merchant, Bombay.
- Vivian McCaw, Senior Partner of Messrs. Kettlewell, Bullen & Co., Calcutta, Bengal.
- Rahimtoola Chinoy, Director of Indian Radio and Cable Communications Company, Bombay.
- R. Srinivasa Sarma, CIE, Editor, The Whip, Calcutta.
- Geoffrey Leonard Winterbotham, Partner, Messrs. Wallace & Co., Bombay.

Colonies, Protectorates, etc.

- John Bagnall. For public services in the Straits Settlements.
- Panayiotis Loizou Cacoyannis. For public services in Cyprus.
- Lieutenant-Colonel John Calderwood Strathearn, CBE MD FRCS, Warden and Chief Surgeon of the St. John of Jerusalem Ophthalmic Hospital, Jerusalem, and Honorary Consulting Ophthalmic Surgeon to the Government of Palestine.
- Edmund Oswald Teale, DSc FGS MInstMM, Mining Consultant to the Government of the Tanganyika Territory.
- Arthur Frederick Clarence Webber, Colonial Legal Service, Chief Justice, Sierra Leone.

=== Order of the Bath ===
==== Knight Grand Cross of the Order of the Bath (GCB) ====
Military Division

- Admiral William Henry Dudley, Earl of Cork and Orrery, GCVO KCB.
- General Sir Alexander Ernest Wardrop, KCB CMG, Colonel Commandant, Royal Horse Artillery, Colonel, 2nd Battalion (Mooltan Battalion) 9th Jat Regiment, Indian Army, Aide-de-Camp General to The King, General Officer Commanding-in-Chief, Northern Command.

==== Knight Commander of the Order of the Bath (KCB) ====
Military Division

Royal Navy

- Vice-Admiral Wilfred Frankland French, CB CMG.
- Surgeon Vice-Admiral Robert William Basil Hall, CB OBE MRCS LRCP KHP.
- Vice-Admiral Percy Lockhart Harnam Noble, CB CVO.
- Vice-Admiral Frank Forrester Rose, CB DSO.

Army

- Lieutenant-General Sir John Edward Spencer Brind, KBE CB CMG DSO (late Royal Artillery), Adjutant-General, Headquarters of the Army in India.
- Lieutenant-General Henry Cholmondeley Jackson, CB CMG DSO, Colonel, The Bedfordshire and Hertfordshire Regiment, General Officer Commanding-in-Chief, Western Command.

Civil Division

- Brigadier-General Walter Robert Ludlow, CB VD TD DL, Honorary Colonel, 8th Battalion, The Royal Warwickshire Regiment.
- Arthur Salusbury MacNalty, MD FRCP MRCS, Chief Medical Officer, Ministry of Health, and Board of Education.

==== Companion of the Order of the Bath (CB) ====
Military Division

Royal Navy

- Engineer Rear-Admiral Francis Edward Dean (Retired).
- Rear-Admiral John Augustine Edgell, OBE.
- Rear-Admiral Geoffrey Layton, DSO.
- Rear-Admiral Lachlan Donald Ian Mackinnon, CVO.
- Engineer Rear-Admiral Percival Edwin McNeil, Royal Australian Navy.
- Colonel William Skeffington Poe, DSO, Royal Marines (Retired).
- Rear-Admiral Bertram Home Ramsay, MVO.
- Rear-Admiral Guy Charles Cecil Royle, CMG.

Army

- Major-General John Blakiston-Houston, DSO (late 11th Hussars (Prince Albert's Own) and 12th Royal Lancers (Prince of Wales's)), Commandant, Equitation School, Weedon, and Inspector of Cavalry.
- Major-General Thomas Gerald Dalby, DSO (late The King's Royal Rifle Corps), Half Pay.
- Major-General Victor Morven Fortune, DSO (late The Black Watch (Royal Highland Regiment) and the Seaforth Highlanders (Ross-shire Buffs, The Duke of Albany's)), Commander, 52nd (Lowland) Division, Scottish Command.
- Colonel (temporary Brigadier) Lord Douglas Malise Graham, DSO MC (late Royal Artillery), Commandant, School of Artillery, Larkhill.
- Major-General Robert Hadden Haining, DSO (late Royal Artillery), Commandant, Imperial Defence College.
- Colonel (temporary Brigadier) Edmund Henry Lancaster, Indian Army, Inspector, Royal Indian Army Service Corps Services (Southern Area), India.
- Major-General George Mackintosh Lindsay, CMG DSO (late The Rifle Brigade (Prince Consort's Own) and Royal Tank Corps), Commander, Presidency and Assam District, Eastern Command, India.
- Major-General James Handyside Marshall-Cornwall, CBE DSO MC (late Royal Artillery), Half-Pay.
- Colonel (temporary Brigadier) Thomas Milne, DSO, Indian Army, Commander, Wana Brigade, Northern Command, India.
- Colonel (temporary Brigadier) Edward Pellew Quinan, OBE, Indian Army, Aide-de-Camp to The King, Commander, 9th (Jhansi) Infantry Brigade, Eastern Command, India.
- Major-General Dudley Sheridan Skelton, DSO (late Royal Army Medical Corps), Honorary Surgeon to The King, Deputy Director of Medical Services, Southern Command, India.
- Major-General Hugh Wharton Myddleton Watson, CMG DSO (late The King's Royal Rifle Corps), Half-Pay.
- Colonel (temporary Brigadier) William Nicholas White, DSO (late Royal Army Service Corps), Inspector of the Royal Army Service Corps.

Royal Air Force

- Air Vice-Marshal Philip Bennet Joubert de la Ferté, CMG DSO.
- Air Vice-Marshal Alfred William Iredell, MRCS LRCP KHP.

Civil Division

- Harold Idris Bell, OBE FBA FSA DLitt, Keeper of the Department of Manuscripts, British Museum.
- Frederick Bryant, OBE, Royal Corps of Naval Constructors.
- Colonel Gerald Trevor Bruce, CMG DSO TD DL, Chairman, Territorial Army Association of the County of Glamorgan.
- William John Gick, CBE, Director of Stores, Admiralty.
- Patrick Ramsay Laird, Secretary, Department of Agriculture for Scotland.
- Honorary Colonel Thomas Edward John Lloyd, DL, Chairman, Territorial Army Association of the County of Anglesey.
- Colonel Henry Royds Pownall, DSO MC (late Royal Artillery), Deputy Secretary, Committee of Imperial Defence.
- Godfrey Rotter, CBE DSc FIC FInstP, Director, Explosives Research Branch, Research Department, Royal Arsenal, Woolwich.
- James Molony Spaight, CBE , Principal Assistant Secretary, Air Ministry.
- John Smale Sutton, Director of Establishments and Commissioner, Board of Customs and Excise.
- John William Todd, CBE FSAA, Accountant General, Ministry of Labour.
- Colonel John Fisher Turner, DSO, Director of Works and Building, Air Ministry.
- Lieutenant-Colonel John Dallas Waters, DSO JP, Secretary of Commissions of the Peace, Lord Chancellor's Department.

=== Order of the Star of India ===
==== Knight Grand Commander (GCSI) ====
- Lieutenant-Colonel Raj Rajeshwar Maharajadhiraja Sir Umaid Singh Bahadur, GCIE KCSI KCVO, Maharaja of Jodhpur (Marwar), Rajputana.

==== Knight Commander (KCSI) ====
- Saramad-i-Rajaha-i-Bundelkhand Sawai Mahendra Maharaja Shri Vir Singh Deo Bahadur, Maharaja of Orchha, Central India.
- Rana Bhagat Chand, CSI, Raja of Jubbal, Simla Hill States, Punjab.

==== Companion (CSI) ====
- George Townsend Boag, CIE, Indian Civil Service, Secretary to the Government of Madras in the Law and Education Department, Madras.
- Raymond Evelyn Gibson, CIE, Indian Civil Service, lately Commissioner in Sind Karachi.
- Gilbert Pitcairn Hogg, CIE, Indian Civil Service, Chief Secretary to the Government of Bengal, Bengal.
- John Nesbitt Gordon Johnson, CIE, Indian Civil Service, Chief Commissioner of Delhi.
- John Carson Nixon, CIE, Indian Civil Service, Secretary to the Government of India in the Finance Department.
- Raja Hamendar Sen, Raja of Keonthal State, Simla Hill States, Punjab.
- Colonel (temporary Brigadier) Lionel Peter Collins, CB DSO OBE ADC, Indian Army, Commandant, Indian Military Academy, Dehra Dun.
- Bertie Munro Staig, Indian Civil Service, Financial Adviser, Military Finance, Government of India.

=== Order of Saint Michael and Saint George ===
==== Knight Grand Cross of the Order of St Michael and St George (GCMG) ====
- Sir William Hill Irvine, KCMG , lately Lieutenant Governor and Chief Justice of the State of Victoria.

==== Knight Commander of the Order of St Michael and St George (KCMG) ====
- Reader William Bullard, CMG CIE, His Majesty's Envoy Extraordinary and Minister Plenipotentiary Designate to His Majesty the King of Saudi Arabia.
- Robert Leslie Craigie, CB CMG, an Assistant Under-Secretary of State in the Foreign Office. For services in connection with the London Naval Conference.
- Sir Selwyn MacGregor Grier, CMG, Governor and Commander-in-Chief of the Windward Islands.
- Robert Archdale Parkhill, Minister for Defence, Commonwealth of Australia.

==== Companion of the Order of St Michael and St George (CMG) ====
- Eric St. John Bamford, Secretary, Imperial Communications Advisory Committee.
- Carl August Berendsen, LLM, Permanent Head of the Prime Minister's Department and Secretary for External Affairs, Dominion of New Zealand.
- Daniel Vickery Bryant. For social welfare and philanthropic services in the Dominion of New Zealand.
- Thomas Joseph Hartigan, FICA, Commissioner for Railways, State of New South Wales.
- John Alexander Norris, Auditor General, State of Victoria.
- Joshua Jennings Wignall, lately Lord Mayor of Hobart, State of Tasmania.
- David Henry Elias, MC, General Manager, Federated Malay States Railways.
- Harold Hignell, Colonial Administrative Service, Senior Provincial Commissioner, Tanganyika Territory.
- Harold James Huxham, Colonial Administrative Service, Financial Secretary, Ceylon.
- William Joseph Johnson, OBE, Treasurer, Palestine.
- Lieutenant-Colonel Morice Challoner Lake, Political Secretary, Aden.
- George Ernest London, Colonial Administrative Service, Colonial Secretary, Gold Coast.
- Arthur Innes Mayhew, CIE, Joint Secretary and Member of the Advisory Committee on Education in the Colonies.
- Henry Harold Scott, MD FRCP, Director of the Bureau of Hygiene and Tropical Diseases.
- Edwin Taylor, Treasurer, Hong Kong.
- Hugh Robert Everard Earle Welby, Colonial Administrative Service, Provincial Commissioner, First Grade, Kenya.
- Captain Victor Hilary Danckwerts, lately Assistant Director of Plans, Naval Staff, Admiralty. For services in connection with the London Naval Conference.
- John Wallace Ord Davidson, OBE, one of His Majesty's Consuls in China.
- Spencer Stuart Dickson, His Majesty's Envoy Extraordinary and Minister Plenipotentiary at Bogotá.
- Harold Edmund Eastwood, Head of the Communications Department of the Foreign Office.
- Clifford Edward Heathcote-Smith, CBE, His Majesty's Consul-General at Alexandria.
- Adrian Holman, MC, a First Secretary in the Foreign Office. For services in connection with the London Naval Conference.
- Major Claude Scudamore Jarvis, OBE, lately Governor of the Province of Sinai, Egypt.

=== Order of the Indian Empire ===
==== Knight Commander (KCIE) ====
- Maharaja Sir Prodyot Kumar Tagore Bahadu, Zamindar, lately President of the Calcutta Silver Jubilee Celebration Committee, Calcutta, Bengal.
- Geoffrey Thomas Hirst Bracken, CSI CIE, Indian Civil Service, Member of the Executive Council of the Governor of Madras.
- Joseph Miles Clay, CSI CIE OBE, Indian Civil Service, Member of the Executive Council of the Governor of the United Provinces.
- Shrimant Madhavrao Harihar alias Baba Saheb Patwardha, Chief of Miraj (Junior), Deccan States Agency.
- Sir Alexander Robertson Murray, CBE, lately Chairman of the Indian Textile Tariff Board.

==== Companion (CIE) ====
- William Scott Brown, Indian Civil Service, Secretary to the Government of Madras in the Public Works and Labour Department, Madras.
- Colonel Richard Barry Butler, CBE MC, Military Secretary to the Governor of Bengal.
- William Edward Dick Cooper, Member, Assam Legislative Council, Assam; Manager, Binnakandi Tea Estate, District Cachar, Assam.
- Edwin Samuel Crump, Indian Service of Engineers, Superintending Engineer, Public Works Department (Irrigation Branch), Punjab.
- Ratanji Dinshah Dalal, Member of the Legislative Assembly, lately of the Public Health Department, Bombay.
- George Kenneth Darling, Indian Civil Service, Commissioner, Lucknow Division, United Provinces.
- Ambroze Dundas Flux Dundas, of the Political Department, lately Deputy Commissioner, Peshawar, North-West Frontier Province.
- Donald Gladding, Indian Civil Service, Secretary to the Government of Bengal in the Finance Department, Bengal.
- Lieutenant-Colonel (Honorary Colonel) Leonard Bishopp Grant, TD, Officer Commanding, The Simla Rifles, Auxiliary Force (India).
- Lieutenant-Colonel John Joseph Harper-Nelson, OBE MC MD FRCS (Edin.), Indian Medical Service, lately Principal and Professor of Medicine, King Edward Medical College, Lahore, Punjab.
- Arthur Neville John Harrison, Chief Auditor, Bombay, Baroda and Central India Railway, Bombay.
- Motabhai Sundarrao Jayakar, Bombay Civil Service, Collector of Kaira, Bombay.
- Evan Meredith Jenkins, Indian Civil Service, Officiating Joint Secretary to the Government of India in the Department of Industries and Labour.
- Nawab Khusru Jung, Major-General in the Kashmir State Force, Army Minister and Minister-in-Waiting on His Highness the Maharaja of Jammu and Kashmir.
- Mir Ghulam Muhammad Khan, Jam of Las Bela State, Baluchistan.
- Lewis Hawker Kirkness, DSO OBE VD, Secretary, Railway Board, Railway Department, Government of India.
- Henry Foley Knight, Indian Civil Service, Secretary to the Government of Bombay in the Home Department, Bombay.
- Machraj Bhawani Shanker Niyogi, Judge of the High Court of Judicature at Nagpur, Central Provinces.
- Brevet-Colonel William Stanhope Pender, MBE, Military Farms Department, Director of Farm, Army Headquarters.
- Major Charles Geoffrey Prior, of the Political Department, Deputy Secretary to the Government of India in the Foreign and Political Department.
- Henry Carlos Prior, Indian Civil Service, Secretary to the Government of Bihar in the Finance Department.
- Thomas Quayle,, Secretary to the High Commissioner for India in the Education Department, London.
- Major Alister John Ransford, Royal Engineers, Mint Master, Bombay.
- Douglas Reynell, Indian Educational Service, Secretary, Public Service Commission.
- M. R. Ry. Diwan Bahadur Madura Balasundaram Nayudu Garu, Merchant, Madras.
- Frederick John Freshwater Shaw, DSc (London) ARCS FLS, Indian Agricultural Service, Director, Imperial Institute of Agricultural Research, and Imperial Economic Botanist, India.
- Thakor Shri Prathisinhji Takhatsinhj, of Sudasna, Sabar Kantha Agency, Jurisdictional Chief, States of Western India.
- William Launcelot Crosbie Trench, Indian Service of Engineers, Chief Engineer in Sind, Bombay.
- Lieutenant-Colonel Cyril de Montfort Wellborne, OBE, Indian Army, Indian Police, Inspector-General of Police, Burma.

=== Royal Victorian Order ===
==== Dame Grand Cross of the Royal Victorian Order (GCVO) ====
- Queen Mary

==== Knight Grand Cross of the Royal Victorian Order (GCVO) ====
- Charles Cheers, Viscount Wakefield, CBE.
- Lieutenant-Colonel Sir Malcolm Donald Murray, KCVO CB CIE.
- Sir Richard Robert Cruise, KCVO FRCS.
- Sir Bernard Edward Halsey Bircham, KCVO.

==== Knight Commander of the Royal Victorian Order (KCVO) ====
- Brigadier-General Archibald Fraser Home, CB CMG CVO DSO.
- Colonel Frank Dormay Watney, CBE TD.

==== Commander of the Royal Victorian Order (CVO) ====
- Admiral Philip Nelson-Ward, MVO.
- Colonel Guy Elland Carne Rasch, DSO, Grenadier Guards.
- Horace James Seymour, CMG.
- William Jackson Bean, ISO.

==== Member of the Royal Victorian Order, 4th class (MVO) ====
- Horace Benjamin Allum, OBE.
- Roland Auriol Barker.
- Major Arnold de Lérisson Cazenove, Coldstream Guards.
- Lieutenant-Colonel William Augustus Fitzgerald Lane Fox-Pitt, MC, Welsh Guards.
- Major Eric Norman Goddard, OBE MC, Indian Army.
- Flight Lieutenant Harry Manners Mellor, Royal Air Force (dated 31 March 1936.)
- Christopher Eden Steel.

==== Member of the Royal Victorian Order, 5th class (MVO) ====
- William Bishop.
- Captain Walter Reuben Lines
- Austin Clement Michils.

=== Order of the British Empire ===
==== Dame Commander of the Order of the British Empire (DBE) ====
Civil Division

- Regina Evans. For political and public services.
- Lady Susan Gilmour. For services in connection with the Queen's Institute of District Nursing in Scotland.

==== Knight Commander of the Order of the British Empire (KBE) ====
Civil Division

- Alexander Maxwell, CB, Deputy Under-Secretary of State, Home Office.
- Sydney Snow. For public and philanthropic services in the Commonwealth of Australia.

==== Commander of the Order of the British Empire (CBE) ====
Military Division

Royal Navy

- Captain Hartley Russell Gwennap Moore, OBE. (Retired).
- Captain William Charles Tarrant, OBE RD ADC, Royal Naval Reserve.

Army

- Lieutenant-Colonel and Brevet Colonel Euston Edward Francis Baker, DSO MC TD, Territorial Army Reserve of Officers, General List, late Officer Commanding 7th City of London Regiment, Territorial Army.
- Colonel (honorary Brigadier) James Archibald Dunboyne Langhorne, DSO, retired pay, late Royal Artillery, late Inspector-General of the West Indian Local Forces, and Officer Commanding the Troops, Jamaica.
- Lieutenant-Colonel Percy John Parsons, ED, Officer Commanding Ceylon Garrison Artillery, Ceylon Defence Force.

Royal Air Force

- Group Captain Henry Ashbourne Treadgold, MD BS MRCS MRCP, Royal Air Force.

Civil Division

- Milgitha Lettice Alcock, OBE, Secretary to the Private Secretary to His Majesty the King.
- Henry Jones-Davies, JP, until recently a Member of the Development Commission.
- Peter David Innes, , Chief Education Officer, City of Birmingham.
- Herbert Kay, Chairman of the Great Marlborough Street Juvenile Advisory Committee. Secretary of the London Employers' Association.
- William Thow Munro, Chairman of the British Textiles Exhibition Committee.
- Colonel Arthur Falkner Nicholson, TD JP DL. For political and public services in Staffordshire.
- Harold Ernest Perrin, Secretary of the Royal Aero Club of the United Kingdom.
- Muriel Ritson, Controller of Insurance and Pensions and Assistant Secretary, Department of Health for Scotland.
- Walter Vernon Rivers. For political and public services in Reading.
- Adela Constance Alexandrina Shaw, OBE JP. For public services in the North Riding of Yorkshire.
- Percy Joseph Sillitoe, Chief Constable, City of Glasgow Police Force.
- Paymaster Commander Edward Wilfrid Harry Travis, Deputy Department Head, Foreign Office.
- Alfred George Tydeman, Controller, Post Office Stores Department.
- Gilbert Shaw Whitham, MIChemE, Assistant Director of Ordnance Factories, War Office.

- Jean Gardner Batten, of the Dominion of New Zealand. For general services to aviation.
- Charles Dalrymple Belgrave, Financial Adviser to Bahrein State, Persian Gulf.
- Martin Charles Boniwell,, Assistant Secretary and Assistant Parliamentary Draughtsman, Attorney-General's Department, Commonwealth of Australia.
- George Preston Bradney, lately Auditor for the Straits Settlements and the Federated Malay States.
- Hugh Hutchison Cassells, MVO, His Majesty's Consul-General at Valparaíso.
- Bertie Harry Michael Easter, MBE , Director of Education, Jamaica.
- John Campbell Fisher, OBE, Deputy Director of Colonial Audit.
- Robert Fraser, a British resident in Buenos Aires, Chairman of the Committee of the British Hospital in Buenos Aires.
- Sidney Howard Grantham, Deputy Inspector-General of Police, Nigeria.
- James Harnetty, Public Service Commissioner and Chairman of the Superannuation Board, State of Victoria.
- Lieutenant-Colonel (Honorary Colonel) Donald Reginald Cavendish Hartley, DSO ED ADC, Managing Director, The Cement Marketing Company of India Ltd., Bombay.
- Hugh Hamilton Newell, MInstCE, Commissioner for Main Road, State of New South Wales.
- Philip Douglas Oakley, MRCS LRCP, Colonial Medical Service, Director of Medical and Sanitary Service, Sierra Leone.
- Evan David Reynolds. For public services in the Uganda Protectorate.
- Russel William Thornton, Agricultural Adviser to the High Commissioner for Basutoland, the Bechuanaland Protectorate, and Swaziland, and Director of Agriculture, Basutoland.
- Harold James Vickers, Indian Police, Deputy Director, Intelligence, Peshawar, at present on deputation with the Government of India.
- Ernest Wright, a British resident in Addis Ababa, Sub-Governor of the Bank of Ethiopia.

Honorary Commanders

- Meir Dizengoff, OBE. For public services in Palestine.
- Usumanu, Emir of Gwandu, Nigeria.

==== Officer of the Order of the British Empire (OBE) ====
Military Division

Royal Navy

- Captain Francis Charles Adelbert Henry, Earl of Kilmorey, Royal Naval Volunteer Reserve.
- Surgeon Captain Ernest MacEwan, MRCS LRCP.
- Commander George Francis Locke Marx.
- Commander Edward Penry Thomas.
- Instructor Commander William Isaac Saxton,.
- Major (Brevet Lieutenant-Colonel) Norman Kempe Jolley, Royal Marines.
- Commander Lancelot Arthur Wetherell Spooner, Royal Australian Navy.

Army

- Major Arthur Charles Barnard, TD, Officer Commanding 22nd (London) Armoured Car Company (Westminster Dragoons), Royal Tank Corps, Territorial Army.
- Lieutenant-Colonel Percy Howard Bartlett, TD, Officer Commanding Devonshire and Cornwall Fortress Engineers, Royal Engineers, Territorial Army.
- Major (local Lieutenant-Colonel) Charles Vere Bennett, AMIMechE, Royal Army Service Corps, Officer Commanding Somaliland Camel Corps, The King's African Rifles.
- Major Adolph Rudolf William Buttner, Australian Staff Corps, Deputy Assistant Adjutant-General (Mobilization and Reserves), and Staff Officer, Rifle Club, 1st District Base, Australian Military Forces.
- Major Eric Thomas Graham Carter, Royal Engineers.
- Chaplain to the Forces, 3rd Class, the Reverend Christopher Maude Chavasse, Royal Army Chaplains' Department, Territorial Army.
- Lieutenant-Colonel Norman Mello Fergusson, TD MB, Royal Army Medical Corps, Territorial Army.
- Major Douglas Hamilton Gordon, DSO, 4th Battalion, 11th Sikh Regiment, Indian Army, late Assistant Commandant Pachmarhi Wing, Small Arms School, India.
- Major (Quarter-Master) Charles Harding, MC TD, 8th Battalion, The Royal Warwickshire Regiment, Territorial Army.
- Chaplain to the Forces, 3rd Class, the Reverend Theophilus Wingfield Heale,, Royal Army Chaplains' Department.
- Captain (local Lieutenant-Colonel) David Arthur Hunt, Royal Artillery, attached Sudan Defence Force.
- Lieutenant-Colonel (Commissary) Saville Britain Jackson, MBE, India Miscellaneous List, India Unattached List, Deputy Assistant Director, Personal Assistant to the Adjutant-General, Adjutant-General's Branch, Headquarters of the Army in India.
- Captain James Francis Scott McLaren, The Black Watch (Royal Highland Regiment), Adjutant, Indian Military Academy, Dehra Dun, India.
- Lieutenant-Colonel and Brevet Colonel Christopher Harold Miskin, MC TD, Officer Commanding 5th Battalion, The Bedfordshire and Hertfordshire Regiment, Territorial Army.
- Lieutenant-Colonel Hugh Stainton Poyntz, DSO, Army Educational Corps, Commandant, Duke of York's Royal Military School, Dover.
- Lieutenant-Colonel James Ronald Roberts, MC, Royal Engineers.
- Lieutenant-Colonel (Quarter-Master) William Sharp, MBE, Extra Regimentally Employed List, Chief Clerk, Aldershot Command.
- Lieutenant-Colonel and Brevet Colonel Thomas Sturrock, MC TD, late Officer Commanding 78th (Lowland) Field Brigade, Royal Artillery, Territorial Army.
- Lieutenant-Colonel and Brevet Colonel Keith Sykes, MC TD, Officer Commanding 5th Battalion, The Duke of Wellington's Regiment (West Riding), Territorial Army.
- Lieutenant-Colonel Robert Douglas Greaves Townend, MC TD, Officer Commanding The London Divisional Royal Army Service Corps, Territorial Army.
- Captain William Tysoe, DSO MC, The Northern Rhodesia Regiment.
- Lieutenant-Colonel and Brevet Colonel Innes Noel Ware, TD, late Officer Commanding 54th (Durham and West Riding) Medium Brigade, Royal Artillery, Territorial Army.
- Major George Wishart Will, MB, Royal Army Medical Corps, Mental Specialist, Southern Command, India.

Royal Air Force

- Wing Commander Thomas Fawdry, MBE.
- Squadron Leader Ralph Squire Sorley, DSC DFC.
- Squadron Leader Henry Edward Forrow.
- Squadron Leader Cecil Arthur Bouchier, DFC.
- Squadron Leader Charles Edward Neville Guest.

Civil Division

- Peter Harvey Allan, MVO JP. For services to education in Edinburgh.
- Oswald William Arnold, Inspector of Audit (Edinburgh) National Insurance Audit Department.
- William George Askew, Secretary of St. Dunstan's. For services to War-blinded Soldiers, Sailors and Airmen.
- Anthony Leslie Ayton, Principal, Colonial Office.
- Florence Beakbane, JP. For political and public services in Liverpool.
- John Irvine Cook, Principal, Ministry of Finance, Northern Ireland.
- William De Prélaz Crousaz, Jurat of the Royal Court and Lieutenant Bailiff of Guernsey.
- Eileen Olive Gertrude Somerset Dawson. For political and public services in Wiltshire.
- Alderman Richard Edwards. For political and public services in North Wales.
- Robert Edwin Field, Principal, India Office.
- William Frowen, JP, Secretary of the General Federation of Colliery Firemen's, Examiners' and Deputies' Associations of Great Britain.
- George Albert Godwin, Honorary Treasurer, Stock Exchange War Wounded Entertainments Fund.
- Martha Kathleen Haslegrave. For political and public services in Yorkshire.
- Eric Henry Edwardes Havelock, Secretary, Development Commission, and Administrative Secretary, Agricultural Research Council.
- Claud Walker Heneage, lately Registrar, HM Land Registry.
- John Rutherford Hill, Resident Secretary in Scotland of the Pharmaceutical Society of Great Britain.
- John Edward Horwell, MBE, Chief Constable, Criminal Investigation Department, Metropolitan Police.
- Captain Alfred Hudson, MBE, Chief Motor Transport Officer, Engineering Department, General Post Office.
- Lindsey Kathleen Huxley, Honorary Treasurer, National Federation of Women's Institutes.
- William Lionel Jenkins, Supervisory Engineer, County Borough of West Ham, and Consulting Engineer to the Lee Conservancy Board.
- Job Leadbetter. For public services in Worcestershire.
- John Leader, Assistant Controller, London Postal Service, General Post Office.
- Duncan Lee, Principal Clerk, Crown Office, Edinburgh.
- John Luxford, Accountant, House of Commons.
- Jabez Lyne. For political and public services in Walthamstow.
- Charles Stuart McFarlane. For political and public services in the West of Scotland.
- Albert Eric Maschwitz, Director of Variety, British Broadcasting Corporation.
- Charles Satchell Pantin, MD BS FRCS LRCP. For public services in the Isle of Man.
- Thomas Leggatt Paterson, Senior Staff Office, Ministry of Transport.
- Robert John Pearson, Chief Constable of Cambridge Borough Police.
- Ivor Powell, Principal, Ministry of Pensions.
- Thomas James Roberts. For political and public services in Glamorgan.
- Donald Gordon Robertson, Senior Investigating Officer, HM Treasury.
- William Hammond Robinson, Senior Inspector, Central Welsh Board for Intermediate Education.
- Henry Stevens, Deputy Divisional Controller, Ministry of Labour.
- Alice Whittingham Straker, JP. For public services in Hexham.
- George Francis Stringer, Clerk of the Metropolitan Water Board.
- Ethel Strudwick,, High Mistress of St Paul's Girls' School, Chairman of the London Headmistresses Employment Committee.
- James Waddington, JP, Chairman of the Accrington Local Employment Committee, Alderman of the Accrington Borough Council.
- Alice Helen Warrender, Founder of the Hawthornden Prize.
- John Paley Yorke, MSc AMIEE, Principal, London County Council School of Engineering and Navigation, Poplar.
- Edwin Arthur Chapman-Andrews, Acting British Consul at Harar.
- Gertrude Mary Carver, until recently a British resident in Alexandria. For services in connection with the Girl Guide Movement in Egypt.
- Kaimakam Thomas William Fitzpatrick Bey, DCM, Assistant Commandant, Alexandria City Police.
- James Thomas Humberstone, a British resident in Chile.
- The Reverend William Thomson, lately Minister of the English Reformed Church, Amsterdam.
- Henry Francis Chester Walsh, Acting British Consul-General at Batavia.
- The Reverend Philip John Andrews, MA DD, Secretary, The Fellowship of the Maple Leaf. For social welfare services.
- Zara Baar Aronson. For philanthropic services in connection with the Red Cross Organisation and other charitable movements in the Commonwealth of Australia.
- Henry James Edward Dumbrell, Director of Education, Bechuanaland Protectorate.
- Rabbi David Isaac Freedman, VD JP. For public and social welfare services in the Commonwealth of Australia.
- Robert Woodward Hammond, MA, Principal of Plumtree School, Southern Rhodesia.
- John George Jearey, Clerk of the Legislative Assembly, Southern Rhodesia.
- Cyril William Kinsman, JP, Official Secretary to the Governor and Clerk of the Executive Council, State of Victoria.
- Walter Alexander Ramsay Sharp, MB ChM FRCS. For social welfare services in the State of New South Wales.
- Harriet Adelaide Stirling, JP. For services in connection with child welfare in the State of South Australia.
- Alan Neil Yuille, MB BS FRCS, Government Medical Officer, Dubbo, State of New South Wales.
- Syed Amjad Ali, Landlord and Partner of Messrs. A. & M. Wazir Ali, Punjab.
- Captain Roger Noel Bacon, of the Political Department, Officer on Special Duty with the Mohmand Force, North-West Frontier Province.
- Khan Bahadur Hormasji Pestonji Chahewala, Assistant Government Pleader, Ahmedabad, Bombay.
- Marcel Dominic D'Cunha, Imperial Customs Service, Assistant Collector of Customs, Bombay.
- Ghulam Yazdani, Nazim of the Archaeological Department of His Exalted Highness the Nizam's Government, Hyderabad, Deccan.
- Jeffrey Arthur Benjamin Hawes, Royal Indian Navy, Naval Store Officer, His Majesty's Indian Naval Dockyard, Bombay.
- Lieutenant-Colonel Anath Nath Palit, Indian Medical Service, Civil Surgeon, Cuttack, and Superintendent, Orissa Medical School, Orissa.
- Captain Raj Kishore Kacker, LMS TDD (Wales), Medical Superintendent, King Edward VII Sanatorium, Bhowali, United Provinces.
- Frederick Graham Roberts, Partner, Graham Roberts & Co., Calcutta, Honorary Secretary of the Bengal Provincial Committee of Their Majesties' Silver Jubilee Fund, Bengal.
- Harold George Russell, Indian Police, Superintendent of Police, Punjab, Lahore.
- Major Frederick William Springett Watkins, Indian Army, The Scinde Horse, lately Private Secretary to Governor of Burma.
- Nana Ayirebi Acquah II, Omanhene of Winneba, Gold Coast.
- Eldred Curwen Braithwaite, MB FRCS, Colonial Medical Service Specialist, Nigeria.
- Geoffrey Fletcher Clay, MC BSc, Colonial Agricultural Service, Deputy Director of Agriculture, Uganda Protectorate.
- Major John Cormack Craig, DSO MInstCE, Director of Public Works, British Guiana.
- Major Joseph Turner Dew, MBE VD. For public services in the Leeward Islands.
- Major Hammett Holland Brassey Edwards, MRCVS, Colonial Veterinary Service, Deputy Director of Animal Husbandry and Chief Veterinary Officer, Kenya.
- Wilfred Jerome Farrell, MC , Deputy Director of Education, Palestine.
- Professor Robert Victor Galea, Rector of Malta University.
- Professor John Lewis Gatt, Director of Public Works, Malta.
- Ernest Wilfred Head, lately General Manager of the Government Railway, Ceylon.
- John Rooke Johnston, Colonial Administrative Service, District Officer, Tanganyika Territory.
- Frank Harold Lowe. For public services in Northern Rhodesia.
- George Henry Masson, MD FRCP, Medical Officer of Health, Port of Spain, Trinidad.
- Horace Walter Raper. For public services in the Straits Settlements.
- William Johnson Thornhill, MInstCE, lately Director of Public Works, Ceylon.
- Charles Gordon Timms, MC LRCP, Colonial Medical Service, Medical Officer, Somaliland Protectorate.
- Gilbert Cochrane Wainwright. For public services in Jamaica.
- Wilfrid Wise, BSc AMICE, Director of Public Works, Fiji.

Honorary Officer

- Tewfik Bey Sinnu, President of the Court of Appeal, Trans-Jordan.

==== Member of the Order of the British Empire (MBE) ====
Military Division

Royal Navy

- Commissioned Gunner Bertie Melbourne.
- Commissioned Engineer George Francis Pengelly.
- Commissioned Engineer William Henry Hodge Northcott.
- Commissioned Writer William Bracey Bolt.
- Chief Officer Gilbert Hall Glastonbury.
- Skipper Lieutenant James William Hubbard, RD, Royal Naval Reserve.
- Lieutenant John Frederick Tucker, Royal Australian Navy.

Army

- No.2605390 Warrant Officer, Class I, Regimental Sergeant-Major Arthur John Brand, Grenadier Guards.
- No.3701706 Warrant Officer, Class I, Sergeant Major-Instructor John Brisbane, Army Physical Training Staff.
- No.726521 Warrant Officer, Class II, Battery Sergeant-Major Ernest Brown, 57th (Wessex) Anti-Aircraft Brigade, Royal Artillery, Territorial Army.
- No.3378319 Warrant Officer, Class II, Regimental Quartermaster-Sergeant Norman Carpenter, Indian Unattached List, Ahmednagar Wing, Small Arms School, India.
- No.1407461 Warrant Officer, Class I, Sergeant Major Assistant Instructor in Gunnery, Ernest John Cherry, Royal Artillery.
- No.1410647 Warrant Officer, Class I, Battery Sergeant-Major Arthur Robert Cole, Royal Artillery, attached Sudan Defence Force.
- No.2967328 Warrant Officer, Class I, Conductor Robert Collie, Indian Army Corps of Clerks, India Unattached List, Superintendent, General Staff Branch, Headquarters, Eastern Command, India.
- No.6549508 Warrant Officer, Class II, Regimental Quartermaster-Sergeant Henry William Edwards, 4th (City of London) Battalion, London Regiment, Territorial Army.
- Conductor William Herbert Fowles, India Unattached List, Military Engineer Services and Public Works Department, Poona, India.
- No.2566380 Warrant Officer, Class I, Squadron Sergeant-Major Thomas Alfred Gamble, late 2nd Cavalry (Middlesex Yeomanry) Divisional Signals, Royal Corps of Signals, Territorial Army.
- Lieutenant (Senior Assistant Surgeon) Albert Edward Gomez, Indian Medical Department, British Military Hospital, Jhansi, India.
- Lieutenant Douglas Foster Grierson, Perak Battalion, Federated Malay States Volunteer Force.
- Warrant Officer, Class I, Staff Sergeant Major, 1st Class, Harold Leopold Gyton, Australian Instructional Corps, Australian Military Forces.
- Warrant Officer, Class I, Staff Sergeant-Major, 1st Class, John Weir Hanlin, Australian Instructional Corps, Australian Military Forces.
- No.1859143 Warrant Officer, Class I, Engineer Draughtsman Quartermaster Sergeant Ralph Daniel Hatcher, Royal Engineers, Chief Engineer's Office, Malaya.
- Lieutenant (local Captain) Walter Robert Haymes, Regular Army Reserve of Officers, General List, Paymaster and Quartermaster, Somaliland Camel Corps, The King's African Rifles.
- Captain Stanley William Joslin, Royal Engineers, Staff Captain, The War Office.
- Captain John Henry Kemp, MC, retired pay, late Royal Army Service Corps, Assistant Officer-in-charge, Royal Army Service Corps Record and Pay Office.
- Captain Brian Bishop Kennett, Royal Corps of Signals, attached Egyptian Frontiers Administration.
- Captain John Alexander Lang, Royal Artillery, Singapore.
- Ida Blanche Leedam, Sister, Queen Alexandra's Imperial Military Nursing Service Reserve, Military Hospital, Catterick Camp.
- Captain (Quarter-Master) Umberto Rimes Lucarotti, The Cameronians (Scottish Rifles).
- Lieutenant (Assistant Commissary) Herbert William Ludlam, Indian Army Ordnance Corps, India Unattached List, Ordnance Inspection Section, Proof and Experimental Establishment, Balasore, India.
- No.386546 Warrant Officer, Class II, Squadron Sergeant-Major Jesson Gunn MacKay, The Lovat Scouts, Territorial Army.
- Captain and Adjutant Gerald Swinden Madden, 2nd Medium Brigade, Royal Artillery.
- Lieutenant Kenneth Ernest Frederick Millar, The Border Regiment.
- No. S/9544 Warrant Officer, Class II, Staff Quartermaster-Sergeant Charles Herbert Potter, Royal Army Service Corps, Malta.
- Warrant Officer, Class I, Conductor George Robinson, Indian Army Corps of Clerks, India Unattached List, Headquarters, Rawalpindi District, Northern Command, India.
- Captain Robert Alfred Rusbridge, Army Educational Corps, Instructor, Royal Military College, Sandhurst.
- Subadar (Sub-Assistant Surgeon) Sampuran Singh, Indian Medical Department, Indian Military Hospital, Quetta, India.
- Captain Leslie Raynar-Smith, The Royal Inniskilling Fusiliers.
- Warrant Officer, Class I, Regimental Sergeant-Major Alexander Smoker, late The Royal Scots Fusiliers, Chief Warden, Yeomen Warders of the Tower, The Tower of London.
- Lieutenant and Ordnance Executive Officer, 3rd Class, Norman Speller, Royal Army Ordnance Corps, Ordnance Depot, Didcot.
- Captain Thomas Henry Langdale Stebbing, MC , Army Educational Corps, late Commandant, King George's Royal Indian Military School, Jullundur, India.
- Assistant Surgeon, 4th Class (Sub-Conductor), Colin Thomas Symonds, Indian Medical Department, British Military Hospital, Belgaum, India.
- Captain Tan Seng Tee, Company Commander, Malacca Volunteer Corps, 4th Battalion, Straits Settlements Volunteer Force.
- Captain John Walter Turner, MC, The Sherwood Foresters (Nottinghamshire and Derbyshire Regiment), late Embarkation Staff Office, Port Sudan.
- No. S/239, Warrant Officer, Class I, Staff Sergeant-Major Charles Ernest Walter, Royal Army Service Corps.
- No.1660762 Warrant Officer, Class II, Battery Sergeant-Major Herbert Featherstone Wenham, Thames and Medway Heavy Brigade, Royal Artillery, Territorial Army.
- Lieutenant David Arnot Williamson, TD, Tyne Electrical Engineers, Royal Engineers, Territorial Army.
- No.539193 Warrant Officer, Class II, Battery Sergeant-Major Frank James Wort, 55th (Wessex) Field Brigade, Royal Artillery, Territorial Army.

Royal Air Force

- Flight Lieutenant Albert Edward Groom, DSM.
- Flight Lieutenant John Frederick Young, MM.
- Flying Officer (Honorary Flight Lieutenant) James Lawrence Jack, MC, Auxiliary Air Force.
- Warrant Officer Harry Vatcher.
- Warrant Officer Robert Michael Wildbore.
- Warrant Officer John Samuel Sallows.
- Warrant Officer Francis Richard Clay.

Civil Division

- Arthur Stanley Allen, Staff Officer, Ministry of Agriculture and Fisheries.
- Allan George Attride, Acting Senior Staff Officer, Air Ministry.
- George Ernest Bailey, Accountant, National Physical Laboratory, Department of Scientific and Industrial Research.
- Felix Wellesley Bensted, Staff Clerk, War Office.
- Maurice Alfred Bevan, Senior Staff Clerk, Ministry of Labour.
- Thomas Ernest Birtwisle, Sanitary Inspector of the Castleford Urban District Council.
- Ellen Blackmore. For political and public services in Somerset.
- Maud Bourchier, Headmistress, Haverstock Hill School for Physically Defective Children.
- Donald Brown, Assistant Postmaster, Glasgow.
- Harry Brown, Public Assistance Officer for the Burgh of Coatbridge, Lanarkshire.
- Thomas Brown, lately Headmaster, Boys' Department, Ducie Avenue Central School, Manchester.
- Ernest Edwin Callaway, Superintendent, Buckinghamshire Constabulary.
- Winifred Lucy Cox, Clerical Officer and Personal Assistant to the Secretary, Reforms Department, India Office.
- Major Arthur William Dawson,, Headmaster, Jarrow Central Council School.
- Phoebe Elliman. For political and public services.
- Alderman William James Fudge, JP. For political and public services in Shoreditch.
- Cecilia Margaret Gardner, Assistant County Director, British Red Cross Society, Dunbartonshire.
- Ejdward Augustus Gardner, Assistant Secretary of the Kent County Playing Fields Association.
- John Wilson Gordon, Chief Public Assistance Officer for the County of Banff.
- William Grant, Head Postmaster, Dumfries.
- James Arnold Hartley, Estate Surveyor, Grade I, HM Office of Works and Public Buildings.
- John Blanc Harvey, Higher Clerical Officer and Assistant to the Private Secretary to the Minister of Transport.
- Lionel Harvey, Engineer-in-Charge, Manchester Station, BBC.
- George Henry Haynes, JP. For political and public services in Staffordshire.
- Alderman Herbert Hiles, JP, Vice-Chairman of the Cardiff Local Employment Committee.
- Lucy Maria Hill, JP, Mayor of Harwich on several occasions.
- Walter George Ives, Assistant Accountant, Colonial and Dominions Offices.
- Horace Iceton James, Auditor of Accounts, County Courts Branch, Lord Chancellor's Department.
- Captain Fred Jones, Headmaster, Pinhoe (Church of England) School, Devon.
- Maurice Samuel Thompson Jones, Superintendent of the London County Council Remand Home, Stamford House, Goldhawk Road, London.
- Charles Land, Superintendent, Higher Grade, Central Telegraph Office, General Post Office.
- James Lloyd, lately Senior Clerk, Civil Service Commission.
- Percival George Lloyd, Chemist and Manager, Borough Sewage Works Department, Kingston upon Thames.
- Catherine Moir. For political and public services in Fife.
- Muriel Eirene Montgomery, Secretary of the Girl Guides Association.
- Frederick Henry Newington, FIC, Assistant Analyst, Admiralty Chemist's Department, Portsmouth.
- Rosina Ada Newnham, Lady Superintendent of the Queen Mary Hostel, Grimsby, Royal National Mission to Deep Sea Fishermen.
- Ernest George Offord, Staff Clerk, Scottish Office.
- Charles Henry Parker, Inspector of Stamping, Board of Inland Revenue.
- Joseph Albert Phythian, Senior Staff Officer, Board of Customs and Excise.
- Florence Mary Potts, JP, Chairman of the Children's Sub-Committee of the Chester, Runcorn, Northwich and District War Pensions Committee.
- William Stewart Rainbow, Senior Staff Officer, Board of Trade.
- Alfred William Primmer Randall, Steward of the County of London Mental Hospital at Bexley.
- Dugard Robertson, lately Superintendent and Deputy Chief Constable, Leicester City Police.
- Charles Sherley Smith, Senior Staff Officer, Ministry of Health.
- William Hamilton Smyth, Superintending Officer, Ministry of Education, Northern Ireland.
- Alderman William Ernest Sowter, JP. For political and public services in Bedford.
- Percy Victor Sprules, Superintendent, Metropolitan Police.
- Jessie Armstrong Swanson, Senior Health Visitor, Edinburgh Corporation scheme of maternity service and child welfare.
- Ernest William Swanton, Curator of the Haslemere Educational Museum, Surrey.
- Annie Mary Norris Tamplin. For political and public services in East Rhondda.
- Percy Cooke Taylor, FCA, Secretary to the Trustee Savings Banks Inspection Committee.
- George Sydney Warren, JP, Member of, and honorary organiser for, both the Hammersmith and the Kensington Local Savings Committees.
- Ethel Victoria Williams, Secretary of the White Heather Fund, Manchester.
- Jane Blackstock Wilson. For political and public services in Glasgow.
- Thomas James Walter Wilson, Establishment and Accounts Officer, Foreign Office.
- Elinor Garbutt Wilton, Clerical Officer and Personal Secretary to the Chairman and to the Secretary, National Savings Committee.
- Khan Bahadur Munshi Siddique Ahmad, Assistant Secretary, British Indian Association, Oud, United Provinces.
- Ahmed Alhadi, Master and Registrar, Supreme Court, Sierra Leone.
- M. R. Ry. Perungavur Varada Achariyar Avargal, ACGI MIEE AMIMechE AAIEE, Executive Engineer, Electricity Department, Madras.
- Ruth Alice Bagot, Lady Superintendent of Nurses, Uganda Protectorate.
- Khan Bahadur Jan Muhammad Khan, Member of the Bombay Legislative Council, Zamindar, Bombay.
- Manser William Bartlett, Superintendent Engineer, Transport Department, Nyasaland Protectorate.
- Rai Bahadur Moti Lai Basu, Comptroller of the Household of the Maharani of Bettiah, Bihar.
- Henriette Baumann. For services to nursing in Kenya.
- Emma Melicent Prater Branch. For services to education in the Leeward Islands.
- Frank Henry Butcher, Madras Agricultural Service, lately Curator, Government Garden, Ootacamund, The Nilgiris, Madras.
- Ratan Mohan Chatterjee, Solicitor and Notary Public, Partner of the firm of Messrs. R. M. Chatterjee & Co., Calcutta, Bengal.
- Arthur Theodore Culwick, Colonial Administrative Service, Assistant District Officer, Tanganyika Territory.
- Eugenie Minne Gorrie Dugmore. For social welfare services in Southern Rhodesia.
- Henry Raymond Edmunds, Superintendent of Agriculture, Kalimpong, Bengal.
- Hilda Fowke, DSc. For social services in Ceylon.
- Querino Bonifacio de Freitas, MRCS LRCP, Government Medical Officer, British Guiana.
- Jane Ingham Frith. For services to education in Bermuda.
- Joseph Francis Gantzer, Deputy Director of Surveys, Bihar.
- M. R. Ry. Sura Rajagopal Nayudu Garu, MB BS MSc DIC FIC, Acting Chemical Examiner, Madras.
- Hirendra Nath Ghosh, of the Associated Press, Bengal.
- Eugene Gregoire, Chief Clerk, Customs Department, Mauritius.
- Robert Alfred Halfhide, Deputy Controller of Printing, Government of India.
- Ernest Charles Harvey, Chief Clerk, Department of Education, Palestine.
- Ernest Howard Hawes, Customs Preventive Service, Chief Inspector, Bombay Customs House, and Protector of Emigrants, Bombay.
- James Rowland Hilder, Warden of the Municipality of Burnie, Tasmania.
- Gertrude Louise Holloway, Chief Clerk, General Office, Royal Empire Society.
- Charles Edwin Holmes, lately Officiating District Controller of Stores, Eastern Bengal Railway, Bengal.
- Frederick York Humphreys, Archivist at His Majesty's Legation at Tehran.
- Dorothy Charles Hutson. For services in connection with the relief of ex-service men in Barbados.
- The Reverend Oliver Jackson. For social welfare services in Newfoundland.
- Robert Jones, Engineer to the Native Administration of the Oyo Province, Nigeria.
- Arthur James Keevill, MB. For public services in the Tanganyika Territory.
- Gerald Percival Keuneman. For public services in Ceylon.
- Khan Bahadur Kershaw Dinshaw Khambatta, LMS LRCP LRCS DPH, Health Office, Poona City Municipality, Bombay.
- William Lacey, AMIMechE, Indian Ordnance Department, Assistant Inspector of Guns, Cossipore, Bengal.
- Edward Walter Lamden, Station Superintendent, Burma Railways, Rangoon, Burma.
- Laura Hermione Longden. For social services in the Uganda Protectorate.
- Robert Key Masson, Customs Superintendent and Superintendent of the Belize Fire Brigade, British Honduras.
- Rao Bahadur Parshuram Gopal Masurekar, Barrister-at-Law, Legal Practitioner, States of Western India.
- Gilbert McGuire, ISO, Indian Medical Department, Assistant Inspector-General of Civil Hospitals, Punjab.
- Elizabeth McMurtrie. For services to nursing in Kenya.
- David McMillan McNair, Inspector of Mines, Gold Coast.
- Lucy Spence Morice. For social welfare services in the State of South Australia.
- Arthur Podmore Oakes, MM, Deputy Commandant of Police, Somaliland Protectorate.
- Samuel Herbert Pearse. For public services in Nigeria.
- William George Peasley, Accounting and Statistical Officer, Department of Customs, Excise and Trade, Palestine.
- Alan Hubert Banbury Perkins, Acting British Vice-Consul at Buenos Aires.
- Hector Percival Ramos, Junior Superintendent, Home Department (Political) Special Branch, Government of Bombay.
- George Edward Sellé, British Vice Consul at Lima.
- Joseph Henry Small, Director of Telegraph Services, Department of Posts and Telegraphs, Newfoundland.
- Raja Narain Pratap Singh, of Malhajini, Special Magistrate and Honorary Assistant Collector, Etawah District, United Provinces.
- Ruby Storey, Honorary Secretary, Randwick Branch of the Red Cross Society, State of New South Wales.
- Kathleen Wanlass Storrier, Nursing Sister, Nigeria.
- Adeline Constance Stourton. For public and social welfare services in the Commonwealth of Australia.
- Ravi Varma Tampuran, retired Sub-Judge, Madras Provincial Civil Service.
- Roland Mervyn Taylor, Assistant Engineer (Telegraph Engineering and Wireless Service), in charge of Bombay Sub-Division.
- Frank Gordon Thorpe, Assistant Public Service Commissioner, Commonwealth of Australia.
- Frank Edward Toms, Office Superintendent, Education Department, Tanganyika Territory.
- William Joseph Toovey, Assistant Director of Stores, Sudan Government.
- John Frederick George Troughton, Colonial Administrative Service, District Officer, Kenya.
- Hylda Margaret Vorstermans (wife of Mr. H. G. P. Vorstermans, Cigar Manufacturer, Dindigul), lately Lady Superintendent, Bowring & Lady Curzon Hospitals, Bangalore.
- Thomas George Westall. For public services in the Windward Islands.
- Elizabeth Wilson, Matron, Maseru Hospital, Basutoland.
- Francis Clement Yardley, Editor of Oversea, the Monthly Journal of the Over-Seas League.

Honorary Members

- Hilmi Saleh Bey Husseini, District Officer, Palestine.
- Haj Nimr Effendi Sabia. For public services in Palestine.
- Avinoam Yellin,, Senior Inspector, Department of Education, Palestine.

=== Order of the Companions of Honour (CH) ===
- William George Stewart Adams, MA DCL, Warden of All Souls College, Oxford. Chairman of the National Council of Social Services. Chairman of the National Federation of Young Farmers' Clubs.
- Joseph Aloysius Lyons, Prime Minister of the Commonwealth of Australia.
- Hugh MacDowell Pollock, JP DL, Minister of Finance, Northern Ireland.
- Janet Penrose Trevelyan, Honorary Secretary of the Foundling Site Appeal Council. Chairman and Honorary Treasurer of the Children's Play Centres Committee.

=== Albert Medal ===
In Gold

- André John Mesnard Melly, MC FRCS (Awarded posthumously).

=== Companion of the Imperial Service Order (ISO) ===
Home Civil Service

- George Henry Cooper, Head of General Branch, Registry of Friendly Societies.
- Arthur William Green, Chief Clerk, Royal Mint, Melbourne.
- Percy John Howard, Principal Clerk, Principal Probate Registry.
- David Goodwin Mackie, Chief Clerk, Exchequer, Edinburgh.
- John McLaren, Deputy Inspector-General of Waterguard, Board of Customs and Excise.
- James Milne Milne-Davidson, Maintenance Officer, HM Office of Works.
- Mark Philip Payne, Chief Constructor, Royal Corps of Naval Constructors, Superintendent of Admiralty Experiment Works, Haslar.
- Sydney Richard Pughe, MBE, Staff Officer, Colonial Office.
- Samuel Rice, Staff Officer, Land Purchase Commission, Northern Ireland.
- Richard Francis Taylor, MBE, Statistical Officer, Mines Department.
- Cecil Francis Wavish, Director, Investigation Branch, General Post Office.
- Frederick George Charles Young, Principal, Air Ministry.

Dominions

- Edgar Jesse Baldwin, Secretary, Police Department, State of New South Wales.
- Ezekiel Cohen, MBE, Principal Clerk, Office of the High Commissioner for Basutoland, the Bechuanaland Protectorate and Swaziland.
- Edward Tannoch McPhee, Commonwealth Statistician, Commonwealth of Australia.
- Alfred Edward Simpson, FSAIA, Architect-in-Chief, State of South Australia.

Indian Civil Services

- Rao Saheb Balaram Mothabhai Rane, Assistant Secretary to the Government of Bombay in the Finance Department, Bombay.
- Rai Bahadur Amrita Lai Banerjee, Assistant Secretary to the Government of India in the Legislative Department.
- Thomas Bertram, OBE, Superintendent, Viceregal Estate, Simla, Delhi and Calcutta.
- Rai Bahadur Sarada Prasanna Ghosh, Bengal Civil Service, Officiating District Magistrate of Hooghly, Bengal.
- Khan Sahib Aspandiar Cooverjee Jassawalla, Personal Assistant to the Engineer-in-Chief, Officer Supervisor and Budget Officer, Engineer-in-Chief's Branch, Army Headquarters.
- M. R. Ry. Rao Sahib Pallavaram Sundara Lokanatha Mudaliyar Avargal, Manager, Office of the Presidency Port Officer and Principal Officer, Mercantile Marine Department, Madras.
- Frederic Augustus Samuels, Assistant Secretary to the Government of the United Provinces in the Public Works Department, Irrigation Branch.
- Nanak Prasad Srivastava, Postmaster General, United Provinces of Agra & Oudh

Colonies, Protectorates, etc.

- Frank Edward Balmer, lately Chief Accountant, Posts and Telegraphs Department, Kenya, Uganda and Tanganyika.
- Evan Browne Bynoe, Provost Marshal and Sergeant at Arms, Barbados.
- Pedro St. Matthew Daniel, lately Senior Registrar, Judicial Department, Nigeria.
- Petros Stavrou Georgiades, lately Chief Clerk, Land Registration and Survey Department, Cyprus.
- Noor Mohamed Hashim bin Mohamed Dali, lately Assistant Economic and Education Officer, Cooperative Department, Federated Malay States.
- Beverley Burnley Littlepage, lately Postmaster-General, Trinidad.
- Melvin Warren Bunting Wright, lately Office Assistant, Public Works Department, Sierra Leone.

=== Imperial Service Medal ===
Indian Civil Services

- Shaikh Abdul Ghafoor, Jemadar of Peons, Viceregal Household.
- Ali Hussain, Jemadar of Peons, Viceregal Household.
- Makhan, Jamadar, Lahore Government Telegraph Office.
- Nungumbaukam Murgugesa Nayakar, Attender, Office of the Director of Public Instruction, Madras.

=== British Empire Medal (BEM) ===
Military Division

For Gallantry

- No.3768885 Private Richard Blackburn, 1st Battalion, The Cheshire Regiment.
- El Yuzbashi (Captain) El Amin Effendi Hemeida, Sudan Defence Force.

For Meritorious Service

- Stoker Petty Officer John Mark Saunders, OND/K22561.
- Sergeant Edgar Tom Lethbridge, Royal Marines, ON.Ply/16251.
- No.1023125 Bombardier (Artillery Clerk) James Christie, Royal Artillery, Anti-Gas Wing, Small Arms School, Winterbourne Gunner.
- No.7576720 Staff Sergeant (local Sub-Conductor) (now Warrant Officer, Class I, Staff Quartermaster-Sergeant) Victor Stanley Ebbage, Royal Army Ordnance Corps.
- No.3768749 Private John Lomax, 2nd Battalion, The King's Regiment (Liverpool).
- No.6132807 Sergeant (local Company Sergeant-Major) Leslie John Paine, East Surrey Regiment, Superintending Clerk, Adjutant-General's and Military Secretary's Department, Sudan Defence Force.
- No.7254432 Sergeant (Temporary Staff Sergeant) Frederick William Stevens, Royal Army Medical Corps, attached to The London Division, Royal Army Medical Corps (TA) School of Instruction.
- No.7682728 Sergeant Peter Stoddart, Corps of Military Police.
- 354523 Flight Sergeant Eric Richard Bloomfield, Royal Air Force.
- 207304 Flight Sergeant Arthur Ashley Lesster, Royal Air Force.
- 348752 Sergeant Philip Cullen, Royal Air Force.
- 506822 Corporal Lawrence Edmund Stack, Royal Air Force.

Civil Division

For Gallantry

- William Jamieson, European Shift Superintendent, Ariston Gold Mine, Prestea, Gold Coast.

For Meritorious Service

- Robert Barr, Postman, Belfast, General Post Office.
- Alice Maud Beckett, Sub-Postmistress, Dersingham, Norfolk.
- Robert Bowman, Officer, HM Borstal Institution, Portland.
- Charles Edward Eastman, Chief Officer (Class I), HM Prison Wandsworth.
- Ernest George Horwill, Sorting Clerk and Telegraphist, Plymouth, General Post Office.
- James Howard, Lately Head Messenger, Printed Paper Office, House of Lords.
- Jane Pett, Telegraphist, Central Telegraph Office, General Post Office.
- Joseph Arthur Swan, Assistant Superintendent, Derby, General Post Office.
- Jim Walls Warren, Postman, Newcastle, General Post Office.
- Corporal John Walter Bailey, St. Vincent Police Force, Windward Islands.
- No.183 Sergeant Hamish Ian McLeod, British Section, Palestine Police.
- No.1185 Constable Geoffrey Harold Ranoe, British Section, Palestine Police.
- Sher Mohamed, Sub-Inspector, Federated Malay States Police.
- No.47 Lance-Corporal Toni, British Solomon Islands Protectorate Constabulary.

=== Air Force Cross (AFC) ===
- Squadron Leader Albert Frank Lang, MBE.
- Flight Lieutenant David Fowler McIntyre, Auxiliary Air Force.
- Flight Lieutenant Harold Francis Jenkins, Reserve of Air Force Officers.
- Flying Officer Jeffrey Kindersley Quill, Reserve of Air Force Officers.

=== Kaisar-i-Hind Medal ===
First Class

- Rajkumar Das, lately Principal, Bethune College, Calcutta, Bengal.
- Mary Davison, Lady Superintendent, Baroda State General Hospital, Baroda, Gujarat States Agency.
- Violet May Haig (wife of Sir Harry Haig, KCSI CIE, Governor of the United Provinces).
- Elsie King (wife of Mr. C. King, ICS, Deputy Commissioner, Rawalpindi District, Punjab).
- Harriette May, Lady Sifton (wife of Sir James Sifton, KCSI KCIE, Governor of Bihar).
- Ruth Young, MBE, Women's Medical Service, Principal, Lady Hardinge Medical College, Delhi.
- Rustomji Bomonji Billimoria, JP, Private Medical Practitioner, Bombay.
- Lala Ishar Das Tandan, of Quetta City, Baluchistan.
- Lieutenant-Colonel Sir James Reid Roberts, CIE, Indian Medical Service (retired), Special Member of Council, Dewas State (Senior Branch), Central India.
- The Reverend John Roy Strock, Bursar, Andhra-Christian College, Guntur, Madras.

=== Appointments ===
Personal Aides-de-Camp to The King

- Admiral The Duke of York, KG KT KP GCMG GCVO.
- Commander The Duke of Kent, KG KT GCMG GCVO.
- Commander Lord Louis Mountbatten, KCVO.
