= Cable & Wireless plc =

British telecom firm

- Traded as: LSE: CW.
- Industry: Telecommunications
- Founded: 1869; 157 years ago
- Defunct: 26 March 2010; 16 years ago
- Fate: Split to form Cable & Wireless Communications and Cable & Wireless Worldwide
- Headquarters: Bracknell, Berkshire, United Kingdom
- Parent: Cable & Wireless (Holding) Ltd. (1934–1947)
- Website: cw.com at the Wayback Machine (archived 2009-05-14)

Cable & Wireless plc was a British telecommunications company.

The firm could trace its origins back to 1869 and the business interests of Sir John Pender, who (via the merger of three separate telegraph companies) became the first chairman of the newly-created Eastern Telegraph Company in 1872. The firm expanded largely through acquisitions of other telegraph companies, operating 22,400 miles by 1887. The company's cable services were heavily used during the First World War, and the cables themselves became targets of warfare in themselves for the first time. The interwar period saw rising competition from radio communications, such as Marconi's Wireless Telegraph Company, thus the communications methods of the British Empire were merged into one operating company in 1928 to create the Imperial and International Communications Ltd; six years later, it was renamed as Cable and Wireless Limited. In 1947, Cable and Wireless was nationalised by the British government and its UK-based assets were integrated with those of the General Post Office.

During 1981, the company was privatised. During the mid-1980s, Cable & Wireless became the first company in the UK to offer an alternative telephone service to British Telecom (via subsidiary Mercury Communications). The company later offered cable TV to its customers, but it sold its cable assets to NTL (now Virgin Media) in 2000. It remained a significant player in the UK telecoms market and in certain overseas markets, especially in the former British colonies of the Caribbean, where it was formerly the monopoly incumbent. It was also the main supplier of communication in the British South Atlantic, including Saint Helena and the Falkland Islands. It was listed on the London Stock Exchange and was a constituent of the FTSE 100 Index.

The company split in March 2010, with its international division demerging to form Cable & Wireless Communications, acquired by Liberty Global in 2015, and since spun-off in 2018 from Liberty Global to Liberty Latin America, while the remainder of the Cable & Wireless business became Cable & Wireless Worldwide and was acquired by Vodafone in 2012.

== History ==
=== 1860 to 1901 ===
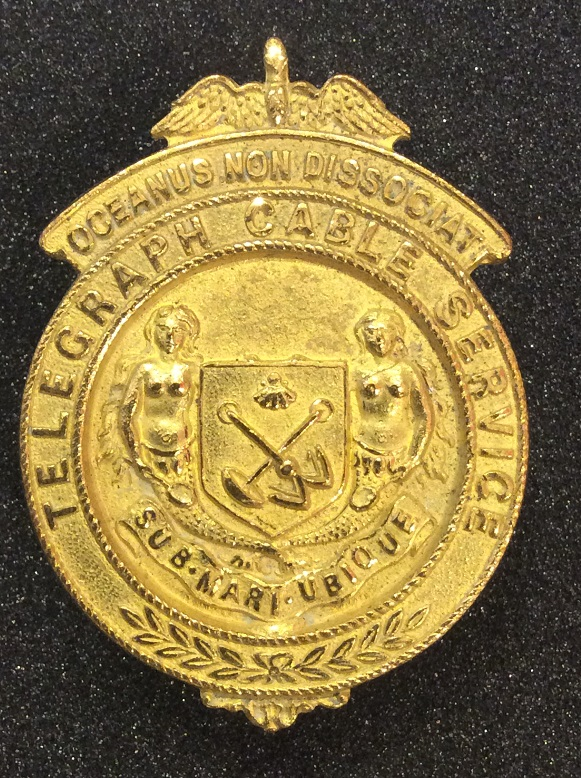
Eastern Telegraph Company lapel badge 1914–1918. Displayed at Porthcurno Telegraph Museum.

Ensign of Pacific Cable Board

House flag of Eastern Telegraph Company

Cable and Wireless traces its history back to a number of British telegraph companies founded in the 1860s, and cites Sir John Pender as the founder. In 1869, Pender founded the Falmouth, Malta, Gibraltar Telegraph Company and the British Indian Submarine Telegraph Company, which connected the Anglo-Mediterranean cable (linking Malta to Alexandria using a cable manufactured by one of Pender's companies) to Britain and India, respectively. The London to Bombay telegraph line was completed in 1870, and in 1872 the three companies were merged with the Marseilles, Algiers and Malta Telegraph Company to form the Eastern Telegraph Company, with Pender as chairman.

The Eastern Telegraph Company expanded the cable length from 8,860 miles on its founding to 22,400 miles just 15 years later. The company steadily took over a number of companies founded to connect the West Indies and South America, among them the Eastern Extension Australasia and China Telegraph Company, leading to a name change to The Eastern and Associated Telegraph Companies in 1902.

=== Early 20th century ===
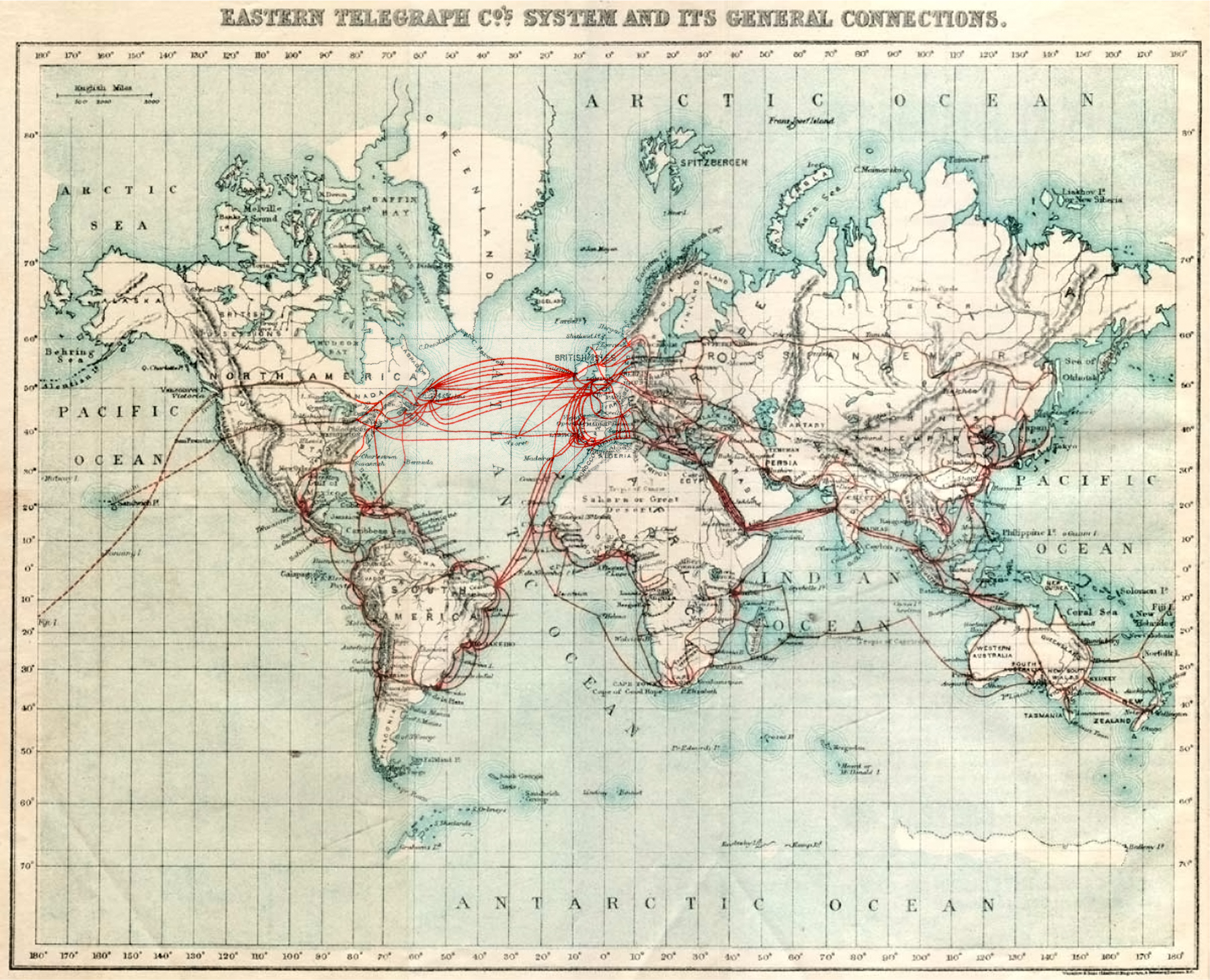
The Eastern Telegraph Company network in 1901

Throughout the First World War, all cable services out of Britain were controlled by the government. The Eastern Telegraph group profited enormously from the diversion of business to India and East Asia, away from the German-owned overland routes and from the general use of telegrams in preference to letters, which were delayed by lack of civilian shipping. For the first time, cables became targets of warfare in themselves. Eastern Telegraph, the British Royal Navy, and the General Post Office collaborated on cutting all cable links between Germany and North America. The Germans temporarily disabled both the Pacific Cable and the cable across the Indian Ocean, by attacking island stations in each ocean. However, the most spectacular event of the first "cable war" came in 1917, when, following the United States' entry into the conflict, the German cable that had been cut three years before was lifted out of its position between New York and Emden, Germany, moved to a new position between Nova Scotia and Cornwall, and taken over by the British government as a prize of war, to be operated by the General Post Office. In 1920, the government decided to keep this cable, despite U.S. protests, and to purchase a second line, the two together being renamed Imperial Cable.

With increasing competition from companies using radio communications, such as Marconi's Wireless Telegraph Company, it was decided in 1928 to merge the communications methods of the British Empire into one operating company, initially known as the Imperial and International Communications Ltd, and from 1934 as Cable and Wireless Limited. The firm formed subsidiary corporations in various countries, such as the Indian Radio and Cable Communications Company in 1932, designed to oversee India's external communications with other countries.

The Second World War revived the 'cable war' of 1914–1918. In 1939, German-owned cables across the Atlantic were cut once again, and, in 1940, Italian cables to South America and Spain were cut in retaliation for Italian action against two of the five British cables linking Gibraltar and Malta. Electra House, the company's head office and central cable station, was damaged by German bombing in 1941. However, the company made a considerable contribution to the Allied war effort, supplying, for instance, the wireless equipment with which the North African campaign was conducted in 1942, and sending staff, in army uniforms marked with Telcon flashes, into several campaigns, starting in Italy in 1943.

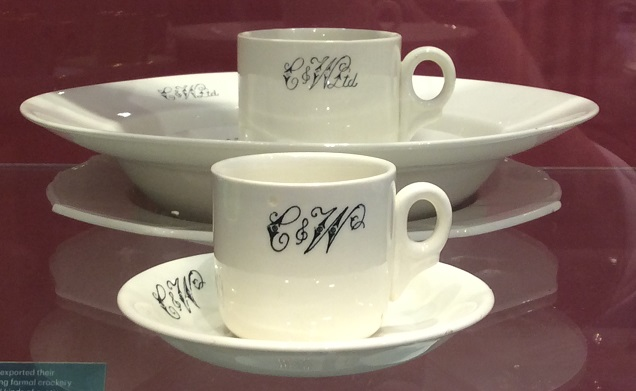
Cable & Wireless company crockery

Following the Labour Party's victory in the 1945 general election, the government announced its intention to nationalise Cable and Wireless, which was carried out in 1947. While the company would remain in being as a government-owned company, continuing to own assets and operating telecommunication services outside the UK, all assets in the UK were integrated with those of the General Post Office, which operated the UK's domestic telecommunications monopoly.

=== Late 20th century ===
In 1979, the Conservative Party government led by Margaret Thatcher began privatising the nationalised industries, and Cable and Wireless was an early candidate because of its history as a private company. The plan to privatise was announced in 1980. The government sold the first half of its share in Cable & Wireless in November 1981. In February 1982, the government granted a licence for a UK telecommunications network, Mercury Communications Ltd, as a rival to British Telecom. It was established as a subsidiary of Cable & Wireless.

Seeing an opportunity to enter the growing US telecom market afforded by new optical fiber technology (The US Communications Act of 1934 prohibited ownership of radio facilities by foreign owned companies), Cable & Wireless acquired 9xDS3s from MCI along the Amtrak right of way and began selling transmission services. Among its early customers was a company named TDX Systems. In 1986, the US long distance industry was deregulated, and many new companies launched into the equal access market. TDX Systems, based in Falls Church, Virginia, was one of these, with a footprint between Washington, DC and New York. TDX carried data (analog modem up to digital DS3), and built its own telephone switches at its engineering facility in Chantilly, VA. TDX voice switches, called "SSTs" (satellite switching terminal) were centrally controlled nationwide by Perkin-Elmer mainframes in Falls Church, and were some of the first long-distance switches to utilize least-cost routing, follow-on account codes and PINs.

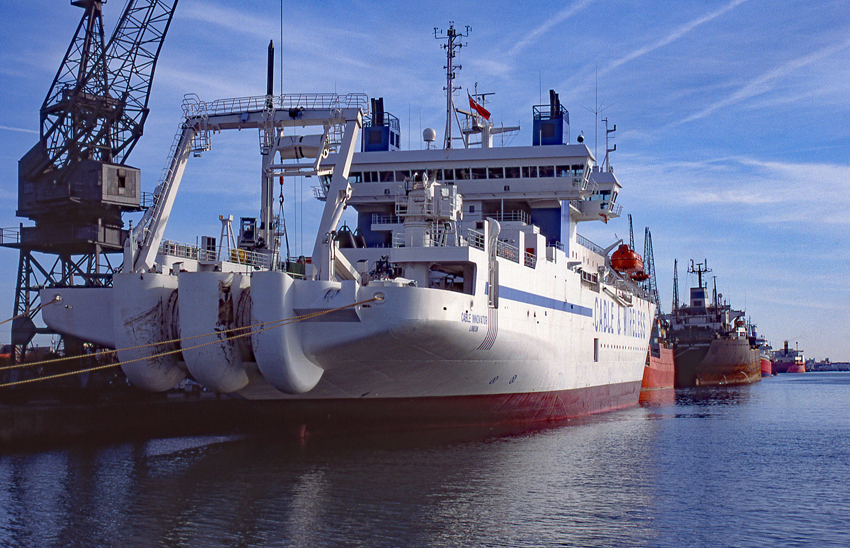
Cable Innovator Cable & Wireless cable laying ship

In 1997, Mercury was merged with three cable operators in the UK (Vidéotron, Nynex, and Bell Cablemedia), and renamed Cable & Wireless Communications. Later that year, Cable & Wireless bought 49% of the Panamanian state-run INTEL (Instituto Nacional de TELecomunicaciones, National Telecommunications Institute) for US$652 million: it is now the largest communications carrier in that country.

In 1998, MCI Communications and WorldCom merged to create MCI WorldCom, the company's existing US subsidiary Cable and Wireless USA, Inc. purchased the MCI tier 1 backbone in the U.S.: prior to 1998, Cable & Wireless USA had merely operated a long-distance telephone business and a small internet service. In 1999, Cable & Wireless began building global IP and IP MPLS (multiprotocol label switching) networks with a strategy to sell global IP services to corporations. Cable & Wireless purchased Japanese company IDC (International Digital Communications), naming it Cable & Wireless IDC Inc; this acquisition made Cable & Wireless the first foreign company to succeed in a contested acquisition bid.

In July 1999, NTL purchased the consumer assets of Cable & Wireless for nearly £8.2 billion, integrating the telephone, internet and television operations of Cable & Wireless into its own ever-expanding operation. This in-part lead to an aggressive strategy where, during 1999 and 2000, Cable and Wireless purchased 12 ISPs and other companies across mainland Europe (Austria, France, Germany, The Netherlands, Belgium, Italy, Spain, and Switzerland) and Sweden and Ireland to create, with its UK business, Cable and Wireless Europe. In December 2000, Cable and Wireless purchased Hyperlink-Interactive.

=== 2001 to 2013 ===
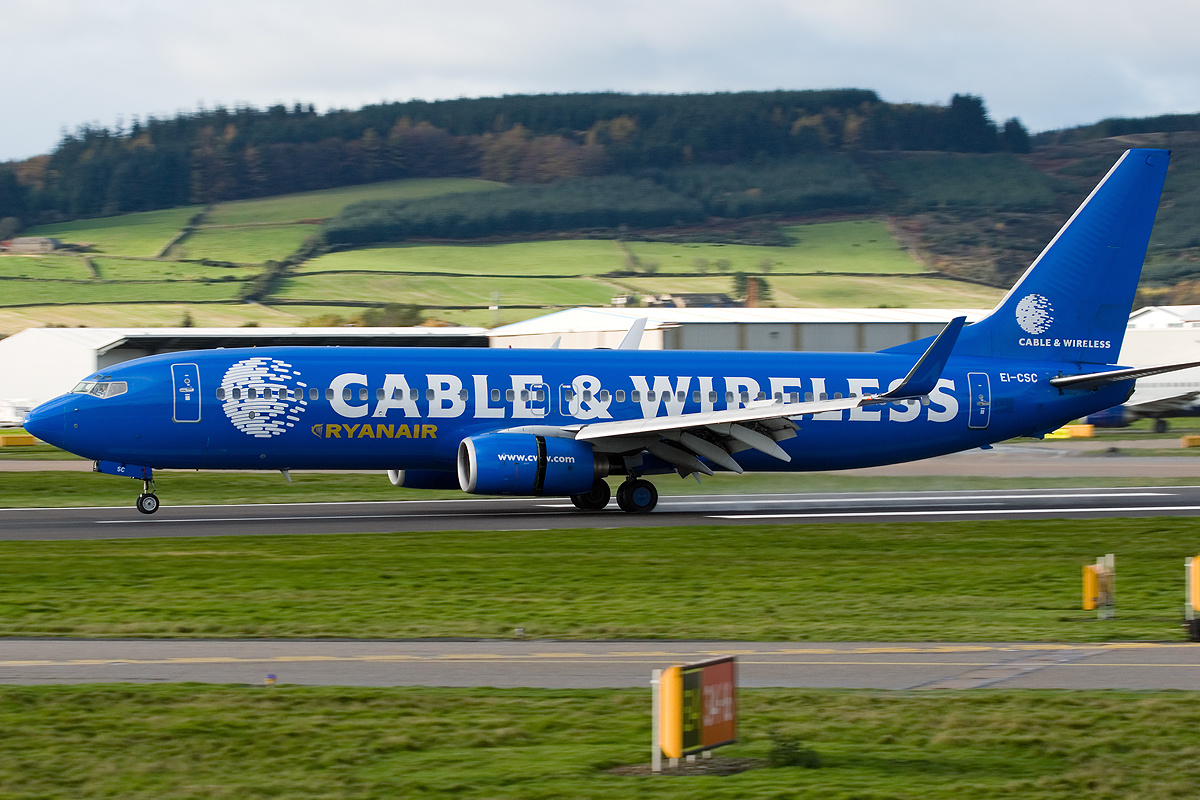
Cable & Wireless Logojet at Aberdeen Airport

In March 2001, Cable and Wireless sold its 52.5 percent stake in Cable and Wireless Optus, which was the second-largest telecom company in Australia, to SingTel; the deal was said to be the second largest corporate deal in Australian history. In November 2001, Cable and Wireless acquired the bankrupt co-location provider Exodus Communications in exchange for US$800 million, and Exodus' operations were then merged with the previously acquired Digital Island and renamed Cable and Wireless America. Also that year, Cable & Wireless bought Digital Island for $340 million and merged the two companies' global networks to create a larger IP backbone.

In May 2002, Cable and Wireless purchased Guernsey Telecoms from the States of Guernsey. Later in 2002, Cable & Wireless announced its withdrawal from the US corporate market, with operations being sold to Primus Telecom. In December of that year, legal action broke out over between Cable & Wireless and a group of investors over claims that the firm had issued false and misleading statements which had led to investors facing heavy losses.

In March 2004, SAVVIS Communications Corporation purchased Cable and Wireless America for US$155 million via the Chapter 11 creditor protection process, assuming liabilities of around US$12.5 million and assets including the former MCI IP backbone AS3561. Cable & Wireless acquired Energis in exchange for £674 million in August 2005, resulting in a reverse takeover in terms of senior management, with John Pluthero appointed from Energis to head the UK business and Francesco Caio departing by April 2006. Cable & Wireless cancelled its American depositary receipts programme in December 2005, voluntarily delisting from the New York Stock Exchange.

In February 2007, Cable & Wireless sold the Web Technology Group, which focused on internet systems for the UK government; one month later, it also sold its cabling business Allnet. That same year, Cable & Wireless publicly disputed BT's connection charges for new customers, alleging its negative impact on their business. In October 2008, Cable & Wireless completed the purchase of Thus plc, which was rebranded as "Thus, a Cable & Wireless business".

In November 2009, the Cable and Wireless plc board announced its intention to separate the Cable & Wireless Communications Group and the Cable & Wireless Worldwide Group, reflecting its belief that the businesses had reached a position where they would deliver increased value to shareholders as separately listed companies. On 26 March 2010, Cable & Wireless Communications demerged as the former CWI Group business (Cable & Wireless International) from Cable and Wireless plc and was listed as a public company on the London Stock Exchange. Cable & Wireless plc became Cable & Wireless Worldwide.

On 23 April 2012, Vodafone announced an agreement to acquire Cable & Wireless Worldwide in exchange for £1.04 billion. The purchase was completed on 30 July 2012, and Cable & Wireless was fully integrated into Vodafone on 1 April 2013.
