= Julian Talbot (writer) =

Austrslian risk management consultant

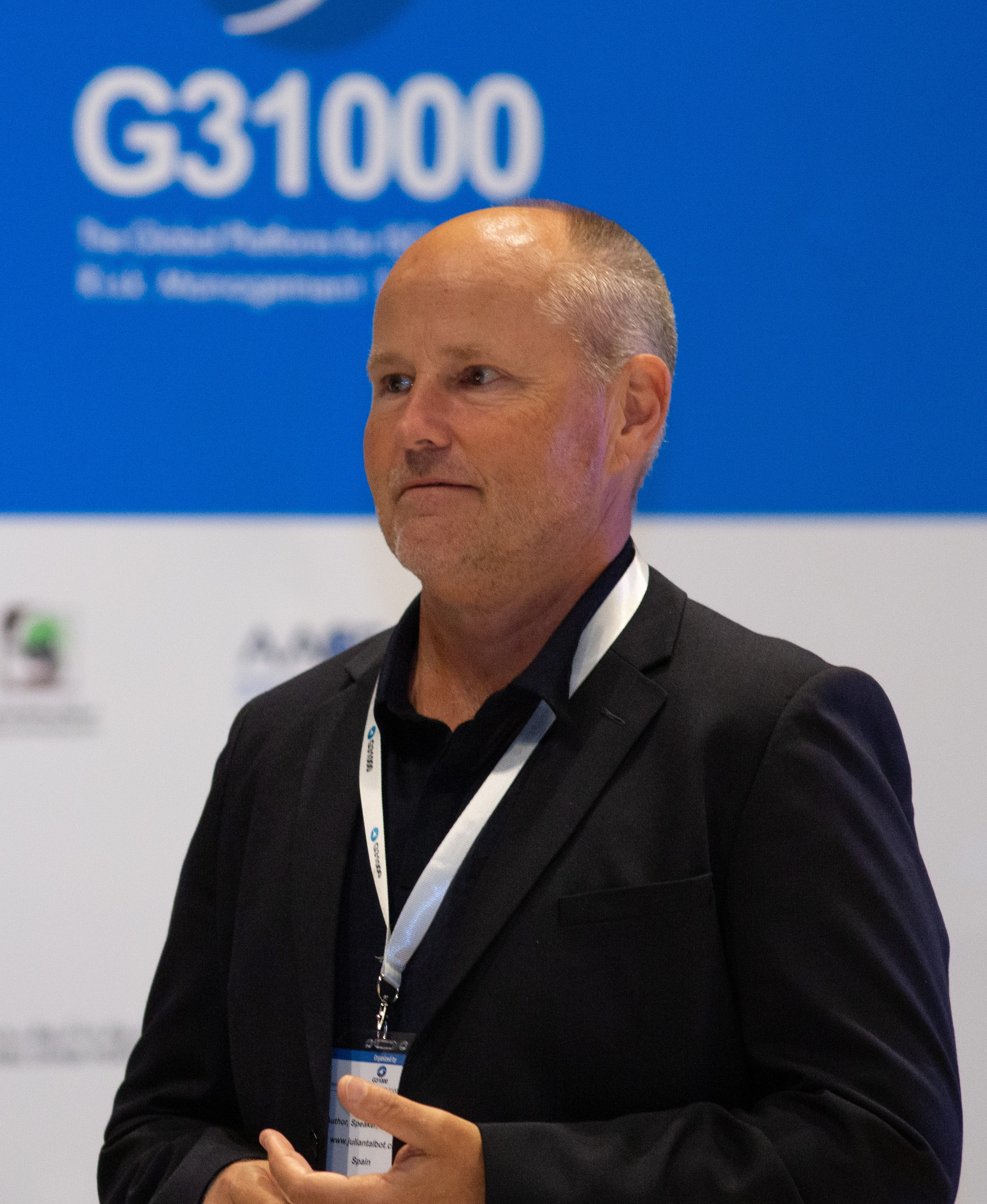
- Born: 1961 (age 64–65)
- Education: Master of Risk Management
- Alma mater: Monash University
- Occupations: Writer, speaker and risk management consultant
- Notable work: Security Risk Management Body of Knowledge
- Website: www.juliantalbot.com

Julian Talbot (born 1961) is an Australian writer, speaker and consultant on risk management. He is co-author of the book Security Risk Management Body of Knowledge.

== Education ==
Talbot graduated with a Master in Risk Management degree from Monash University, Melbourne, Australia, in 2006. He is a Certified Protection Professional, the security industry's highest level of professional achievement.

== Career ==
In the period 1995–2001, Talbot served as head of security for Woodside Energy's North West Shelf Venture, Australia's largest natural resources project. He then worked as head of risk and security for the Malaysia Smelting Corporation's Indonesian operations, as senior risk adviser for the Australian Department of Health and Ageing, and as head of security for the Australian Trade Commission (Austrade). From 2006 to 2009, he was the risk management practice leader for Jakeman Business Solutions (JBS), one of Australia's leading consulting firms.

From 2007 to 2015, he served as the chairman of Citadel Group Limited and also was a member of its Audit Review Committee.

=== Public service ===
Talbot served as director of the Risk Management Institution of Australasia (2006–09) and as director of the Australian Institute of Professional Intelligence Officers (2008–09).

He was the director of the Security Analysis and Risk Management Association, based in Washington, DC from 2010 to 2015.

=== Writing career ===
In 2009 Talbot co-authored the Security Risk Management Body of Knowledge, a large and comprehensive repository of knowledge, including the best practices, recent innovations and evolving research, in the area of security risk management.

=== Public speaking ===
He is a professional speaker at international conferences.

== Bibliography ==
=== Risk management ===
- Security Risk Management Body of Knowledge (Wiley, 2009; ISBN 978-1118212905) (Wiley Series in Systems Engineering and Management) - joint author: Miles Jakeman
- How to Performance Benchmark Your Risk Management: A Practical Guide to Help you Tell if Your Risk Management is Effective (Resilent Risk, 2016) - joint author: Miles Jakeman
- The New Supervisor's Handbook: Congratulations on Your Promotion. Now What? (TA Trust, 2014; ISBN 978-1623467951) (Junior Leadership Skills series)
- Security Risk Management Aide-Mémoire (SERT Ltd., 2019; ISBN 978-0648690702)
- The Traffic Light Protocol and Controlled Information Sharing: A Security Risk Practitioner's Guide to Deciding Who Else May See It (SRMBOK Ltd., 2026)

=== Domestic and family violence: Australian Capital Territory ===
- A System That Cannot See Itself: The Public Edition (2026)
- A System That Cannot See Itself: The Technical Volume: Domestic and Family Violence in the Australian Capital Territory, 2016–2026, and How to Fix It (2026) - Foreword by Dr Gavriel Schneider.
