= WTG (disambiguation) =

WTG, or Web Technology Group, is a technology consultancy and solutions provider.

WTG may also refer to:

- Westgarth railway station, Melbourne
- World Transplant Games, an international multi-sport event organized by the World Transplant Games Federation
- WTG Records, an American record label
- WTG Morton (1819–1868), American dentist and physician
