= Horace Walter Raper =

British businessman (1882-1937)

Horace Walter Raper OBE
- Born: 29 June 1882; London
- Died: 12 December 1937 (aged 55); Beaconsfield
- Occupation: Businessman
- Organization: Great Eastern Life

Horace Walter Raper OBE (29 June 1882 – 12 December 1937) was a British businessman who spent his career in Singapore, Straits Settlements.

== Early life and education ==
Horace Walter Raper was born on 29 June 1882 in London, and was educated at Merchant Taylor's School.

== Career ==
In 1908, he went to Singapore as secretary to the newly established firm of Great Eastern Life Assurance Company (today known as Great Eastern Life). In 1918, he was appointed director, and in 1923, was appointed managing director when he succeeded the founder of the company, A. H. Fair, on his retirement. He served the company until 1937 when he was forced to retire because of ill health.

During his 29 years with the company, Raper witnessed the company's rapid growth from its small beginnings in 1908, as the first life assurance company to be founded in Malaya, to its establishment as a large organisation with business throughout Asia under his stewardship.

== Public life ==
Raper was a prominent figure in the civic life of Singapore. He was president of the Straits Settlement (Singapore) Association, and served for several terms on the Municipal Commission. In 1937, he was appointed member of the Legislative Council of the Straits Settlements. He was president of the Singapore Rotary Club, and for ten years was honorary secretary of the Singapore Golf Club. He was a Justice of the Peace and served as chairman of the Visiting Justices of Singapore.

== Retirement and death ==
In 1937, Raper retired to Beaconsfield, England, due to ill health, where died on 12 December 1937.

== Honours ==
Raper was appointed Officer of the Order of the British Empire (OBE) in the 1936 King's Birthday Honours.
