= Alexander Robertson Murray =

Sir Alexander Robertson Murray KCIE CBE (29 November 1872 – 19 March 1956) was a former President of the Bengal Chamber of Commerce.

== Career ==
A native of Elgin, he commenced his business career in the town clerk's office at Montrose, coming to Dundee some years later, when he entered the service of Messrs Andrew Hendry & Sons, solicitors, although he did not actually become articled to the legal profession. He went to India in 1899, where he had a distinguished career in commercial and public life.

The son of a Scottish railway official, as a young accountant he went out to Calcutta, working his way up to become head of two firms based in Clive Street, then the bastion of English mercantile trade in imperial Calcutta, Thomas Duff and Co., and Jardine, Skinner and Co. He was evidently a prominent figure in the commercial life of Bengal, becoming President of the Bengal Chamber of Commerce and representing it in the Bengal Legislature. He sat on various committees and commissions relating to Indian business and economics. In 1913 and 1917-19 he was selected Chairman of the Indian Jute Mills Association and in 1927 was named Chairman of the Indian Mining Association. He represented the Bengal Chamber of Commerce in the Bengal Legislative Council (1919) and in the Imperial Legislative Council (1920) and in the Council of State (1921–23). In 1920 he became President of the Bengal Chamber of Commerce and of the Associated Chambers of Commerce of India and Ceylon. He represented employers of at International Labour Conferences: 1919 in Washington, D.C. and 1924 in Geneva. The Government on India placed Murray on the Indian Retrenchment Committee (1922–23). From 1922 to 1927 he served as Governor of the Imperial Bank of India. He held memberships on the Royal Commission on Indian Currency and Finance (1925–26) and the Royal Commission on Indian Labour (1929–31). He presided over the Indian Special Tariff Board (1935–36).

On retiring from Bengal in 1928, he moved to England where he was appointed director on numerous company boards, such as Lloyds Bank Ltd., Bank of London and South America Ltd., the Samnuggur, Titaghur and Victoria Jute Companies and was Deputy Governor of Hudson's Bay Company. He was also on the governing body of the School of Oriental and African Studies from 1935 to 1948.

== Honours ==
In recognition of his work he was made CBE in the 1919 New Year Honours, knighted in 1921, made Knight of Grace of the Order of St. John of Jerusalem (KGStJ) in 1924 and created Knight Commander of the Order of the Indian Empire (KCIE) in 1936.

== Family ==
He was born to Alexander Murray and Catherine Robertson. He married Margaret Allan Grant and had a son and two daughters. The Times of 19 April 1944 carried a notice of the marriage of Captain Alexander Grant Murray, The Seaforth Highlanders, only son of Sir Alexander Murray, K.C.I.E, C.B.E., and Lady Murray, Uplands, Hughenden to Pamela Mary Upham, A.T.S. Tragically Captain Murray was to die later that year whilst serving with his regiment, probably in Normandy. His name is included on the plaque in the north aisle of Hughenden Parish Church which commemorates the men of the parish who died on active service during World War II.
