= Alfred Tebbitt =

Sir Alfred St Valery Tebbitt (10 December 1871 – 30 March 1941) was a French-British businessman. He was managing director of Kirby, Beard & Co. and British Chamber of Commerce, Paris, and of the Hertford British Hospital, Paris.

Born in France, he was knighted in 1936, and was also a Chevalier of the Legion d'honneur (1928). He was the son of Charles Tebbitt and Emily Houston. In 1904, he married Gladys Pendrell Smith; they had two sons and one daughter.

He died in 1941 and is buried in the Ascension Parish Burial Ground, Cambridge.
