= David Henry Elias =

British railway administrator (1882–1935)

David Henry Elias CMG MC
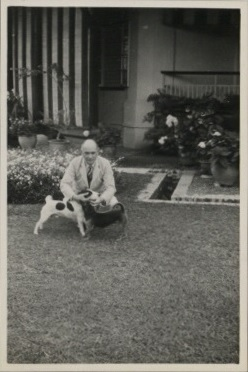
- Elias in 1935
- Born: 7 December 1882; London
- Died: 13 March 1953 (aged 70); Sidmouth, Devon
- Occupation: Railway administrator
- Years active: 1899–1937

David Henry Elias (7 December 1882 – 13 March 1953) was a British railway administrator who was responsible for the operation of national railways in South Africa, Kenya, Uganda, Nigeria and the Federated Malay States.

== Early life ==
Elias was born on 7 December 1882 in London, the son of David Elias.

== Career ==
Elias began his career, aged 17, working on the Great Western Railway in England. In 1902, he went to South Africa where he served for 20 years with South African Railways. During the First World War (1914–1918) he served first in German South West Africa, and later in France with the South African Infantry Brigade where he won the Military Cross.

After leaving South African Railways in 1922, he transferred to Kenya and Ugandan Railways where he remained until 1925, and then served from 1925 to 1931 with Nigerian Railways.

In 1931, he went to Malaya as Deputy Manager, Federated Malay States Railways when there was a need for experience and expertise on the commercial aspects of railway administration rather than in construction and engineering as had been previously the case. On the retirement of John Strachan in 1933, an engineer by profession, he replaced him as General Manager, Federated Malay States Railways. When he assumed office, the Federated Malay States was in an economic slump and the railways had suffered large losses. By 1935, they returned to profit and, although this was partly due to the improvement in economic conditions, it was widely acknowledged that this was also due to his skill with railway management policy. He retired in 1937.

== Personal life and death ==
Elias married Fairlie Seale in 1944 who survived him. There were no children.

Elias died on 13 March 1953 at Sidmouth, Devon aged 70.

== Honours ==
Elias was awarded the Military Cross (MC) in 1917. He was appointed Companion of the Order of St Michael and St George (CMG) in the 1936 Birthday Honours.
