= John Bagnall =

British industrialist and colonial administrator (1888 – 1954)

Sir John Bagnall
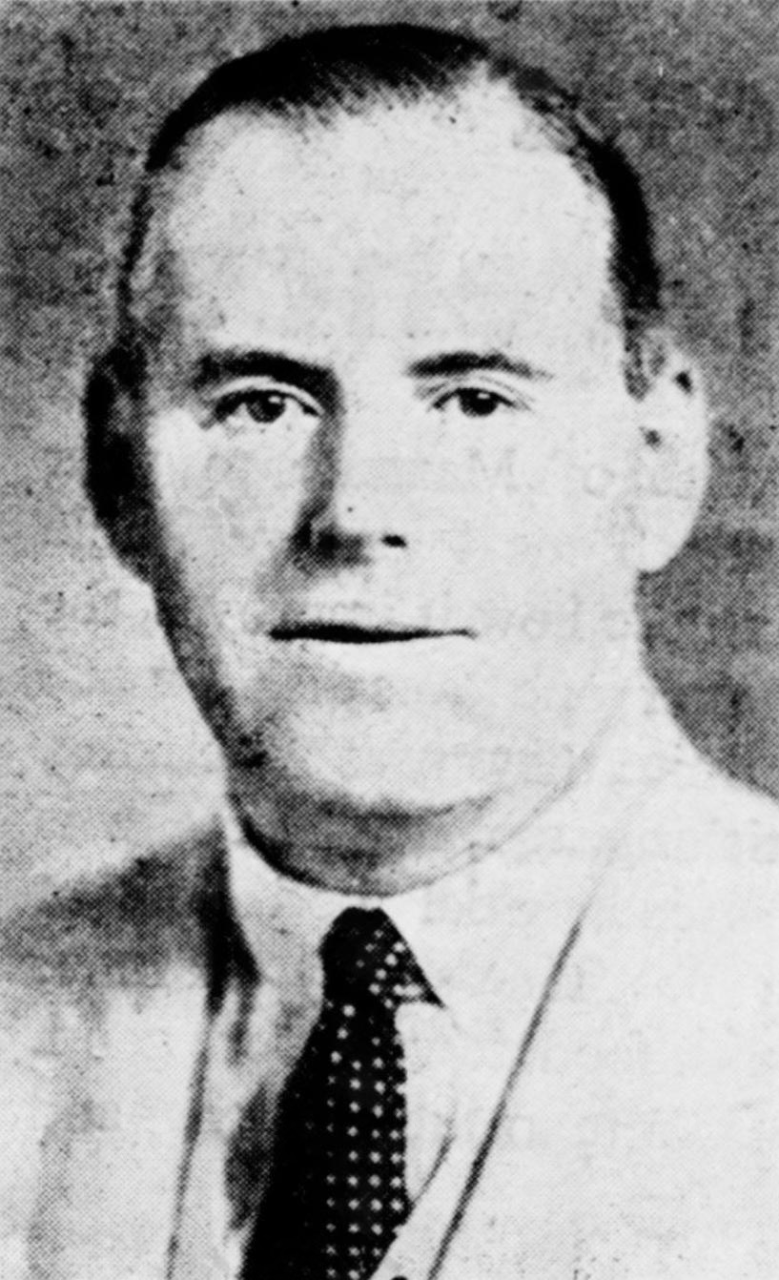
- Bagnall, c. 1939
- Born: 23 May 1888
- Died: 1954 (aged 66); Johannesburg
- Occupations: Industrialist and colonial administrator

Sir John Bagnall (23 May 1888 – 1954) was Chairman and Managing Director of the Straits Trading Company Limited (1923–1947), which was one of the largest tin smelting and refining companies in the world, and a member of the Legislative Council of the Straits Settlements.

== Career ==
Son of Albert Edward Bagnall of Liverpool, John Bagnall was born on 23 May 1888, and educated at the Liverpool Institute. In 1904, he joined the shipping firm of Alfred Holt and Co of Liverpool where he remained for eight years.

In 1913, Bagnall went to Malaya and joined the Straits Trading Company Limited which at the time was one of the largest tin smelting and refining companies in the world providing half of global supply. In 1923 he was appointed chairman and managing director, positions which he held until his retirement in 1947.

Bagnall was an unofficial member of the Legislative Council of the Straits Settlements from 1926 to 1939, and of the Executive Council from 1935 to 1942. From 1927 to 1932 he was chairman of the Singapore Chamber of Commerce. He also served on various committees including the Finance Committee, the Standing Advisory Committee on Opium, the Trade Statistics Commission, Bankruptcy Committee, Customs Duties Committee, and the Trade Commission.

== Personal life and death ==
Bagnall married Lynn, widow of Major Allen Turnbull, in 1934. There were no children of the marriage. In 1942, he escaped from Singapore shortly before it was captured by the Japanese army. Although his ship, HMS Grasshopper, was subsequently sunk by air attack, he managed to reach an uninhabited island and eventually Ceylon. He died in 1954, aged 66, in Johannesburg.

== Honours ==
In 1935, Bagnall was awarded the King's George V Silver Jubilee Medal. He was appointed a Knight Bachelor in the 1936 King's Birthday Honours.
