= Walter Nutt =

The Honourable Walter Frederick Nutt OBE
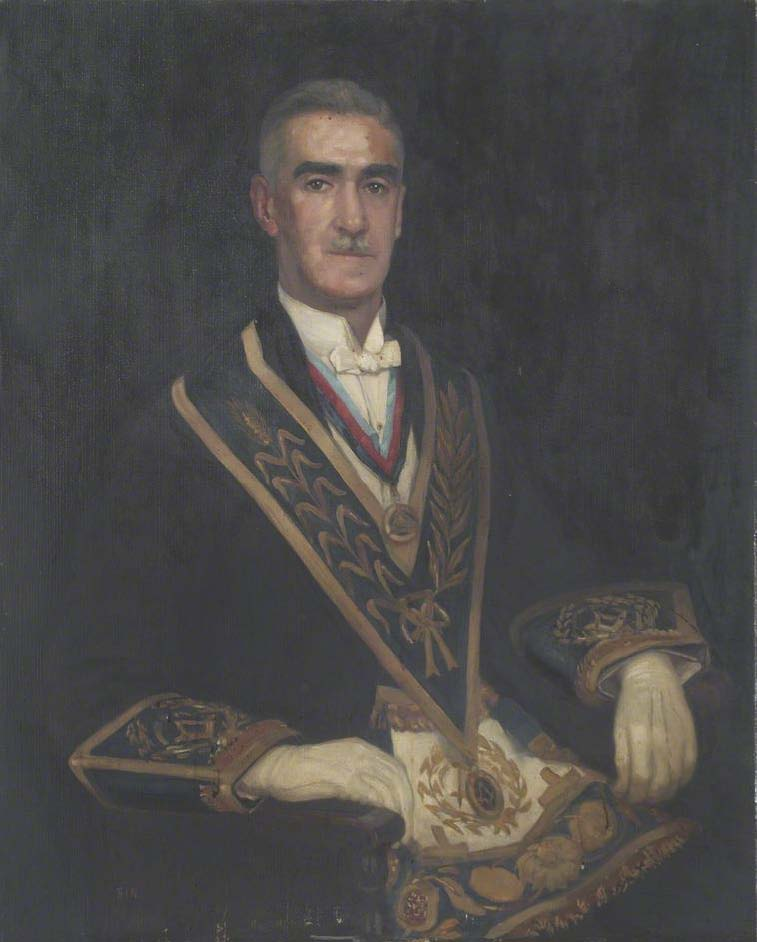
- Born: 1874; London, England
- Died: 14 November 1940 (aged 65–66); London, England
- Education: Bedford Modern School
- Known for: Managing Director of The Straits Trading Company

Walter Frederick Nutt OBE (1874 – 14 November 1940) was Managing Director of The Straits Trading Company (1918–21), at the time one of the largest tin smelting companies in the world, a member of the Federal Malay States Legislative Council and a prominent freemason who was District Grand Master of the Eastern Archipelago (1919–23).

== Early life ==
Walter Nutt was born in Kensington, London in 1874. He was the son of William Henry Rothery Nutt, an official of the Bank of England, and his wife Kathleen Laura (née Bloxham). Like his brothers, Arthur Nutt and Harold Nutt, he was educated as a boarder at Bedford Modern School.

== Career ==
Nutt was an expatriate in Malaysia and Singapore for much of his commercial life. He was a director of several commercial concerns including the Bagan River Rubber Company and Managing Director of The Straits Trading Company (1918–21). He was a member of the Federal Malay States Legislative Council.

In 1918, Nutt was awarded an OBE for services in connection with war charities.

In 1919, Nutt successfully speculated in the tin market on behalf of the Straits Trading Company. However, similar efforts in 1921 resulted in the company having to miss a semiannual dividend for the first time in its history. Nutt was forced to resign in January 1922.

== Masonic and yachting interests ==
Nutt was a prominent Freemason becoming District Grand Master of the Eastern Archipelago (1919–23) He was also the first Commodore of the Republic of Singapore Yacht Club.

== Personal life ==
On 16 May 1905, Nutt married Gertrude Isabel Cowper at St Andrew's Cathedral, Singapore. Gertrude Nutt was an artist and the portrait she painted of her husband in full masonic regalia is included in the BBC’s Your Painting series.

== Death ==
On 27 February 1937, Gertrude Nutt died and Walter Nutt died three years later, on 14 November 1940, following an operation in London. Walter and Gertrude Nutt were survived by two daughters.
