= Straits Trading Company =

Singapore-based conglomerate

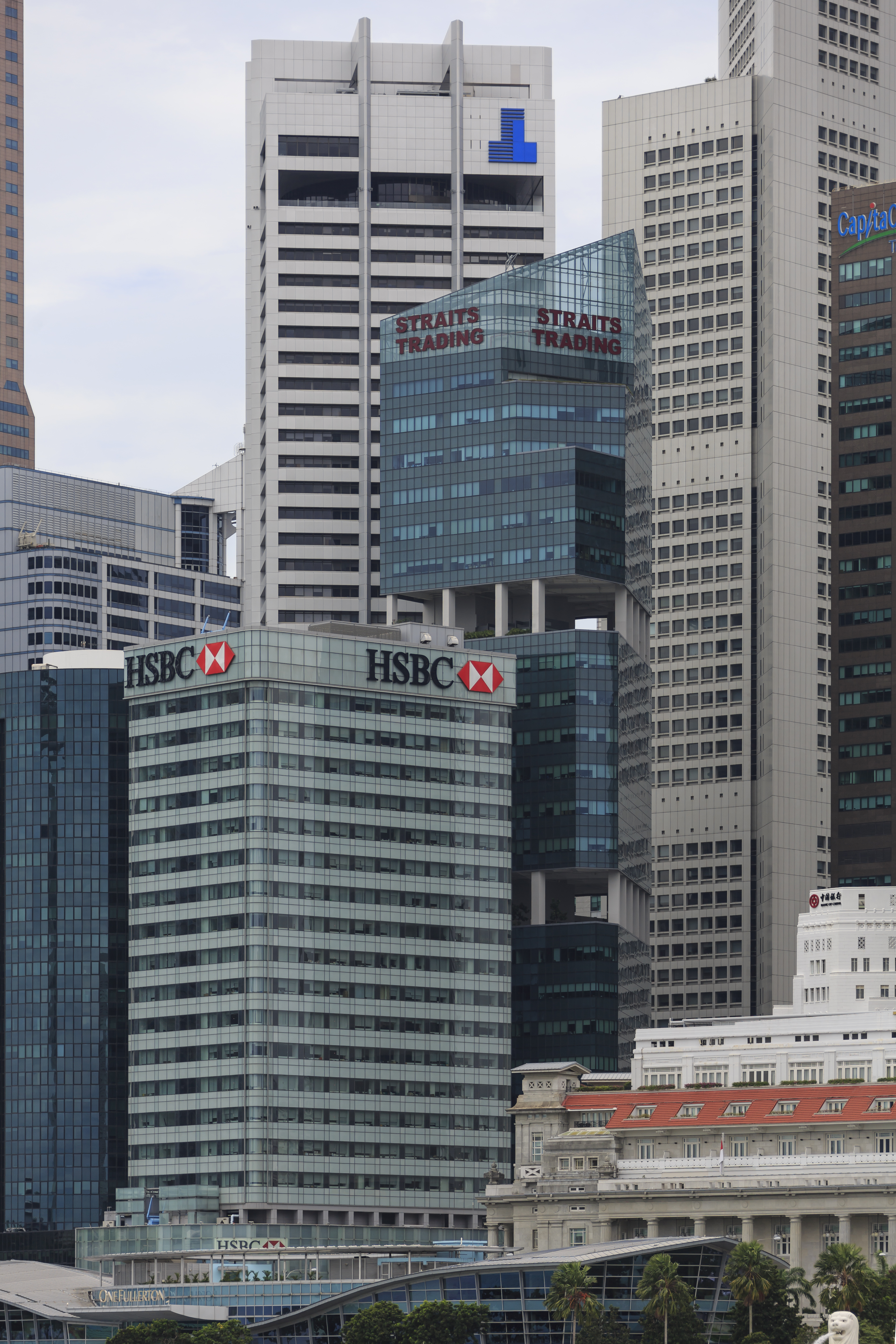
- The Straits Trading Building among the high-rises at Marina Bay
- Traded as: SGX: S20
- Key people: Chew Gek Khim (Executive Chairman)
- Net income: ▼ S$218.4 million (as of 2025)
- Website: www.straitstrading.com.sg

The Straits Trading Company Limited is a Singapore-based corporation with operations in Singapore and Malaysia, as well as various localities in Asia and Australia.

Founded in 1887, the company was the result of a partnership for tin smelting between James Sword, a Scottish businessman, and Herman Muhlinghaus, a German entrepreneur; the Straits Trading Company was later incorporated in Singapore on 8 November 1887 with a hefty capital of S$150,000 during its days.The company eventually rose to become one of the largest tin smelters in the world, operating at tin rich deposits in the Kinta Valley and Klang Valley of then British Malaya (Peninsular Malaysia).

By the late-20th century, the company began diversifying into hotel and property management, and financial investment; it also became a member of the Tecity Group. Mining and smelting operations that the Straits Trading Company was originally engaged in were eventually carried out by its 73%-owned subsidiary, the Malaysia Smelting Corporation Berhad (MYX: 5916), a public listed company on Bursa Malaysia.

In January 2026, Straits Trading Company, through its subsidiary Straits Real Estate, entered into an agreement to divest a logistics asset in Incheon, South Korea, to a local institutional investor for approximately S$396 million.

== See also ==
- Walter Nutt, Managing Director of Straits Trading Company (1918-1921)
- Sir John Bagnall, Chairman and Managing Director of Straits Trading Company (1923-1947)
