= Muriel Ritson =

Scottish civil servant (1885-1980)

Muriel Ritson CBE
- Born: 8 July 1885
- Died: 8 July 1980 (aged 95)
- Education: Greenock Academy
- Known for: Scottish representative on the Beveridge Committee which formed the National Health Service

Muriel Ritson CBE (1885–1980) was a Scottish career administrator and worked in the civil service. Her most important position was the Scottish representative for the Department of Health on the Beveridge Committee which was responsible for creating the National Health Service of the United Kingdom.

== Early life ==
Muriel was in born in Gourock to John Fletcher Ritson, a railway agent, and Agnes Jane Catto. She attended Greenock Academy and a German finishing school. She always valued having been educated at a co-educational school, and worked to promote women's equality in the workplace.

She began working as a social worker and rent collector for the Glasgow Workman's Dwellings Company between 1908 and 1911.

== Career ==
Her work with the GWDC made her familiar with health insurance work. During World War I she served on Public Health Committees and worked social and public health in Glasgow. She joined the Commission of Investigation which visited France in connection with the WAAF.

In 1919 she was appointed the only woman in the Scottish Board of Health, which consisted of only six people. It administered health policy in Scotland between 1919 and 1928. In 1929 she worked for the new Department of Health for Scotland. She sat on the Committee on the Admission of Women to the Diplomatic and Consular Service. Her most prestigious appointment was with the Beveridge Committee representing the Department of Health, which formed the National Health Service. In 1936, she was made a Commander of the Order of the British Empire.

== Legacy ==
Before her retirement in 1946 she became Scottish Controller of the Ministry of National Insurance. She sat on the Ryan Committee which examined health insurance, and on the Committee on Admission of Women on the Diplomatic and Consular Service. She is remembered for her work in public health, health insurance, and in her promotion of women in public life. Her most important contribution was to the Beveridge Committee, which was instrumental in helping to establish the National Health Service of the United Kingdom.
