= El Amin Effendi Hemeida =

- Born: c. 1900; Sudan
- Died: 23 May 1973; Sudan
- Military career
- Allegiance: United Kingdom
- Branch: Sudan Defence Force
- Rank: El Yuzbashi
- Conflicts: Second World War
- Awards: George Cross; Member of the Order of the British Empire

El Amin Effendi Hemeida, GC, MBE (c. 1900 – 23 May 1973) was a soldier in the Sudan Defence Force, who was awarded the Empire Gallantry Medal for his heroism in Omdurman following an accidental munitions explosion in 1936. Hemeida's Empire Gallantry Medal was exchanged for the George Cross in 1940.

== Military career ==
In 1936 Hemeida was awarded the Empire Gallantry Medal "for conspicuous gallantry and devotion to duty in circumstances of very considerable personal danger". It was gazetted on 23 June 1936. The citation read:

On the morning of 4th January, 1936, in the Barracks at Omdurman, a party of the Sudan Defence Force were engaged in making explosive charges. El Amin Effendi Hemeida was in charge of a section of the working party, whose duty was to place the guncotton and primers in containers.

A charge which was being assembled in another part of the room accidentally exploded, killing one Non-Commissioned Officer and injuring a Native Officer and eight Non-Commissioned Officers. The building was extensively damaged and fire broke out in several places.

El Yuzbashi El Amin Effendi Hemeida, though uninjured was badly shaken and dazed. On recovering, although fully realising the risk of 'further explosions, since he knew that three more containers filled by his section were still; in the room, he immediately went to the assistance of the injured, and then took active steps to extinguish the fires and remove the unharmed charges to a place of safety.

His gallant behaviour was instrumental in saving at least one life among the injured, and his presence of mind undoubtedly prevented further explosions which must have resulted in greater loss of life.

In September 1940, the medal was converted automatically to the newly created George Cross.

He died on 23 May 1973 and was reportedly cremated in the Sudan.

As of 2018, his medals remain in the ownership of his family; they were featured in an episode of the BBC television programme Antiques Roadshow on 24 February 2019.
