= Indian Radio and Cable Communications Company =

Former corporation based in India

The Indian Radio and Cable Communications Company was a subsidiary corporation formed by Imperial and International Communications, Ltd. and the India Radio Telegraph Company in 1932. Its purpose was to operate India's external communications to other countries. The Indian government took over the assets of the company in 1947, placing them into the Ministry of Communications as the Overseas Communications Service.
