= Hertford British Hospital =

Hospital in France

Coordinates: 48°53′24″N 2°16′49″E

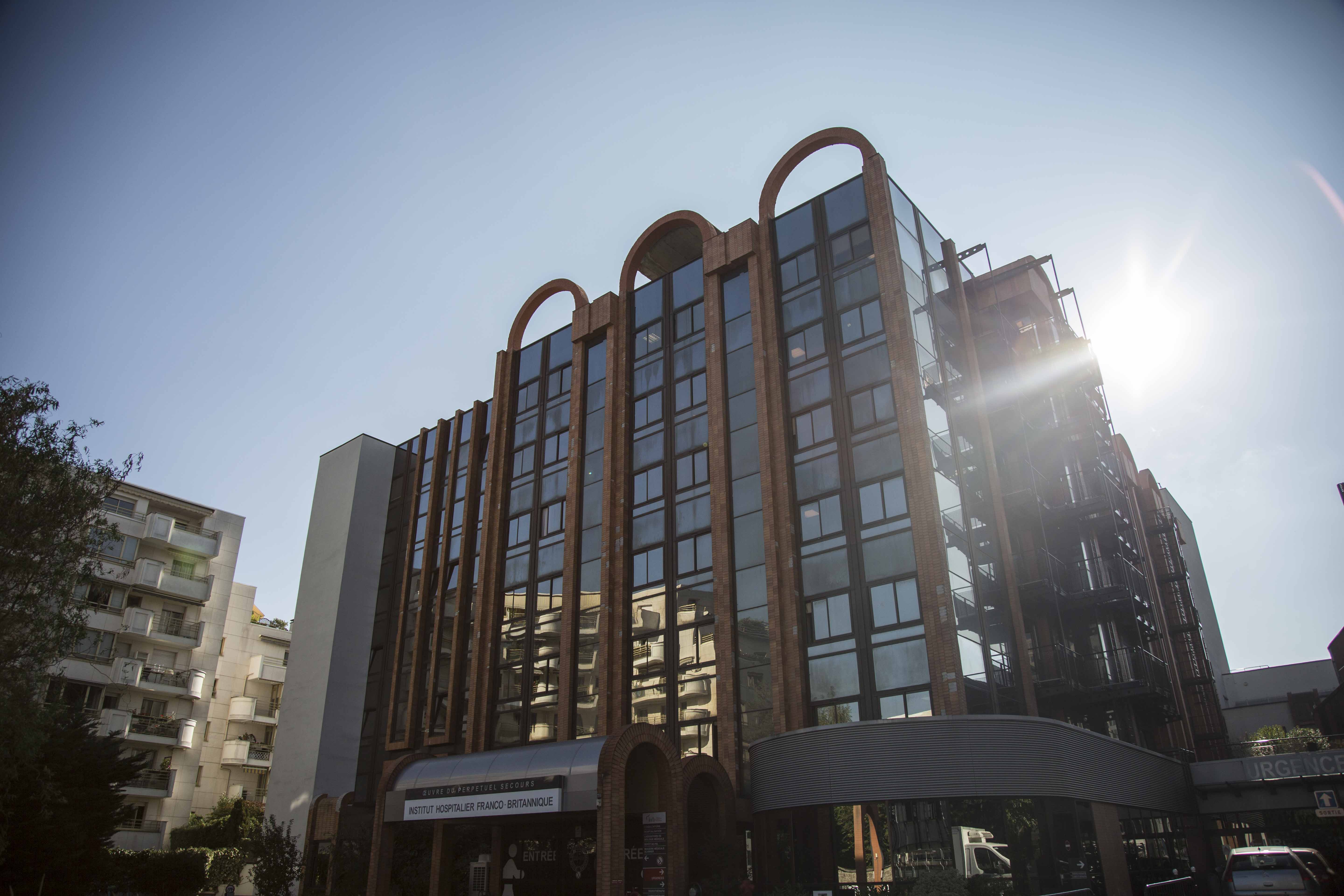
Hôpital franco-britannique formerly the Hertford British Hospital

The Hertford British Hospital was a hospital founded in Paris in 1871 for British and other English-speaking patients. In 2008, it merged with a nearby French hospital and was renamed to Hôpital franco-britannique. The Hertford British Hospital building was designed by Ernest-Paul Sanson and is a protected national monument.

== History ==
The hospital was founded in 1871 by Sir Richard Wallace, younger son of the Marquess of Hertford. In 1874, it opened its hospital at 3 rue Barbès in the Paris suburb of Levallois-Perret, near Neuilly-sur-Seine.

The site was taken over as a British military hospital and from 1957 to 1961 run by the War Office. This association ended in 1963, when the British Government arranged for the hospital to become financially independent.

In 2008, the Hertford British Hospital merged with the neighbouring Hôpital du Perpetuel Secours on Rue Kleber, to form the Institut Hospitalier Franco-Britannique.

The current Patron of the charity is the 9th Marquess of Hertford: his predecessor as Patron was Queen Elizabeth The Queen Mother.
