= Civica (company) =

International software business group

Civica Group Limited
- Type: Private
- Industry: Software and IT services
- Founded: 2001; 25 years ago in London, United Kingdom
- Headquarters: London, UK
- Number of locations: 42
- Services: Provides management/enterprise software for public-sector functions such as healthcare, local government, education, transport and utilities
- Owner: Blackstone Inc. (2024–); Partners Group (2017–2024)
- Divisions: Government, Social housing, Enforcement and emergency services, Education and libraries
- Website: www.civica.com

Civica Group Limited is an American-owned international software company headquartered in London, UK, with regional offices in Australia, Singapore, and North America.

== History ==
Civica was set up through a management buy-out from the Sanderson Group in 1999, backed by venture capitalist group Alchemy Partners and led by Simon Downing who became chief executive. The Civica Group was officially formed from the Sanderson Group in 2002. The group was subsequently listed on the Alternative Investment Market of the London Stock Exchange in 2004. It was delisted in 2008 when it was acquired by 3i for £190 million.

In September 2009 Civica acquired in4tek, a community health and social care record software specialist based in Altrincham.

In April 2011 Civica UK, a wholly owned subsidiary of Civica Group, acquired specialized document and records management services provider Cave Tab.

In May 2011 it acquired PSCAL, a financial management software and services provider for the NHS.

In June 2012, Civica acquired Gateway Computing Ltd, publisher of WinDIP Enterprise, a document and records management software suite.

In 2013, Civica acquired Corero Business Systems, an educational software provider.

In 2014, Civica acquired both Coldharbour Systems, a software provider in the healthcare sector and particularly for care homes, and Healthcare and Keystone Asset Management, an asset management specialist for the Housing market. Also, in 2014 Civica acquired Asidua, a local government contact management and application specialist and telecoms specialist.

In 2016, Civica acquired Norwel Legal and IPL Information Processing Limited.

In 2016 Civica also acquired government digital specialist SFW LTD. through which Civica converted SFW India Pvt LTD. to Civica offshore resourcing center in Vadodara, India.

In December 2016 Civica acquired Abritas, a social housing software developer and service provider based in Reading, Berkshire.

Civica was sold to Partners Group in July 2017 for £1.06 billion. At that point it had about 3,700 staff.

In 2018 Electoral Reform Services was sold out to Civica, becoming Civica Election Services.

In November 2023, Partners Group sold Civica to alternative asset manager Blackstone Inc. for approximately $2.5 billion. The takeover was completed in May 2024.

== Operations ==
Civica offers services across the following markets:

- Local Government
- Social housing
- Parking enforcement & public protection
- Libraries and education
- Mobile fleet and asset management
- Public protection
- Pension administration
- Health and Social Care
- Legal

=== Education and libraries ===
Civica provides software and IT services to education and learning services, including shared learning environments, library management services, and software licensing frameworks. The group also provides IT services including virtual learning environments (VLE) for schools in Sheffield and Luton under the Building Schools for the Future (BSF) program.
