= Taman Setia Jaya 2 =

Human settlement in Malaysia

Taman Setia Jaya (Jawi: تامن ستيا جاي 2; Chinese: 金宝二镇) is a township in Bandar Penggaram, Batu Pahat District, Johor, Malaysia.

Development of the township began in 2006 after another nearby township, Taman Flora Utama. Taman Setia Jaya 2 is located along Jalan Tan Siew Hoe. The new township is developing rapidly and there are many shops moving in from older parts of town and also many new shops in this township. A shopping area, Carrefour hypermarket and Square One Shopping Mall (第一坊) is just located beside this township.

This township is under the jurisdiction of Batu Pahat Municipal Council.

== See also ==
- Cities of Malaysia
- SMK Tinggi Batu Pahat
- Taman Flora Utama
- Taman Bukit Pasir
- Pura Kencana
- Batu Pahat Mall
