= Malaysia Federal Route 184 =

Road in Malaysia

Federal Route 184
- Jalan Padang Tembak, Kluang

Route information
- Maintained by Malaysian Public Works Department
- Length: 12.00 km (7.46 mi)

Major junctions
- Northeast end: Kampung Serong
- J16 Jalan Paloh; FT 50 Federal Route 50; FT 91 Federal route 91; J25 Jalan Kluang–Renggam
- Southwest end: Mengkibol

Location
- Country: Malaysia
- Primary destinations: Paloh; Gunung Lambak

Highway system
- Highways in Malaysia; Expressways; Federal; State

Jalan Padang Tembak, Kluang, Federal Route 184, is a federal road in Johor, Malaysia. The road was a part of Johor State Route 16 before being recommissioned as a federal road. The Kilometre Zero of the Federal Route 184 starts at Kampung Serong junctions.

At most sections, the Federal Route 184 was built under the JKR R5 road standard, allowing maximum speed limit of up to 90 km/h.

== List of junctions and towns ==
Km	Exit	Interchange	To	Remarks
		Kampung Serong	Northwest; J16 Jalan Paloh; Paloh; Jagoh; Bekok; Yong Peng West; FT 91 Kluang town centre FT 50 Ayer Hitam; FT 50 Batu Pahat; North–South Expressway Southern Route AH2 North–South Expressway Southern Route; Kuala Lumpur; Johor Bahru East; FT 50 Kahang; FT 50 Jemaluang; FT 3 AH18 Mersing	Junctions
		Jalan Padang Tembak, Kluang Police Quarters		
		Jalan Kahang Barat	East; Jalan Kahang Barat; Felda Kahang Barat	T-junctions
		Bulatan Semberong roundabout	Northwest; FT 91 Kluang town centre FT 50 Ayer Hitam; FT 50 Batu Pahat Southeast; FT 91 Sri Lambak; FT 91 Bandar Tenggara; FT 91 Kulai; FT 91 Kota Tinggi	Roundabout
		Stesen Mardi Kluang		
		Railway crossing bridge		
		Mengkibol	J25 Jalan Kluang–Renggam Northwest; J25 Kluang town centre FT 50 Ayer Hitam; FT 50 Batu Pahat; North–South Expressway Southern Route AH2 North–South Expressway Southern Route; Kuala Lumpur; Johor Bahru Southwest; J25 Renggam; J25 Simpang Renggam; J25 Layang Layang	T-junctions
