= Taman Bukit Pasir =

Township in Batu Pahat, Johor, Malaysia

Taman Bukit Pasir is a township in Bandar Penggaram, Batu Pahat, Johor, Malaysia. This township is mainly for finance, banking, and commercial activities. Development of the township began in the early 1990s. Taman Bukit Pasir is located along Jalan Bukit Pasir and Jalan Tan Siew Hoe. The township is developing rapidly. There are many shophouses and houses in this township. A shopping area, Wira Court, is also located in this township.

There are many banks in this township:

- EON Bank
- Standard Chartered Bank
- Bank Mualat
- Bank Ariffin
- Bank Allian

This township is under the jurisdiction of Majlis Perbandaran Batu Pahat (MPBP).

== See also ==
- Cities of Malaysia
- Batu Pahat
- Bandar Penggaram, Batu Pahat
- SMK Tinggi Batu Pahat
- Taman Flora Utama
- Taman Setia Jaya 2
- Pura Kencana
- Batu Pahat Mall
- Segenting(石文丁)
- Pantai Minyak Beku
