= J26 =

J26 may refer to:

== Roads ==
- County Route J26 (California)
- Johor State Route J26 in Malaysia

== Vehicles ==
- GSR Class J26, an Irish steam locomotive
- LNER Class J26, a British steam locomotive class
- North American J 26 Mustang, an American fighter aircraft in service with the Swedish Air Force

== Other uses ==
- Gyrobifastigium, a Johnson solid (J_{26})
- J26 G8 Protests, held in Calgary, Alberta in June 2002
- Small nucleolar RNA J26
