= Taman Flora Utama =

Township in Johor, Malaysia

Coordinates: 1°51′57.2″N 102°56′57.7″E

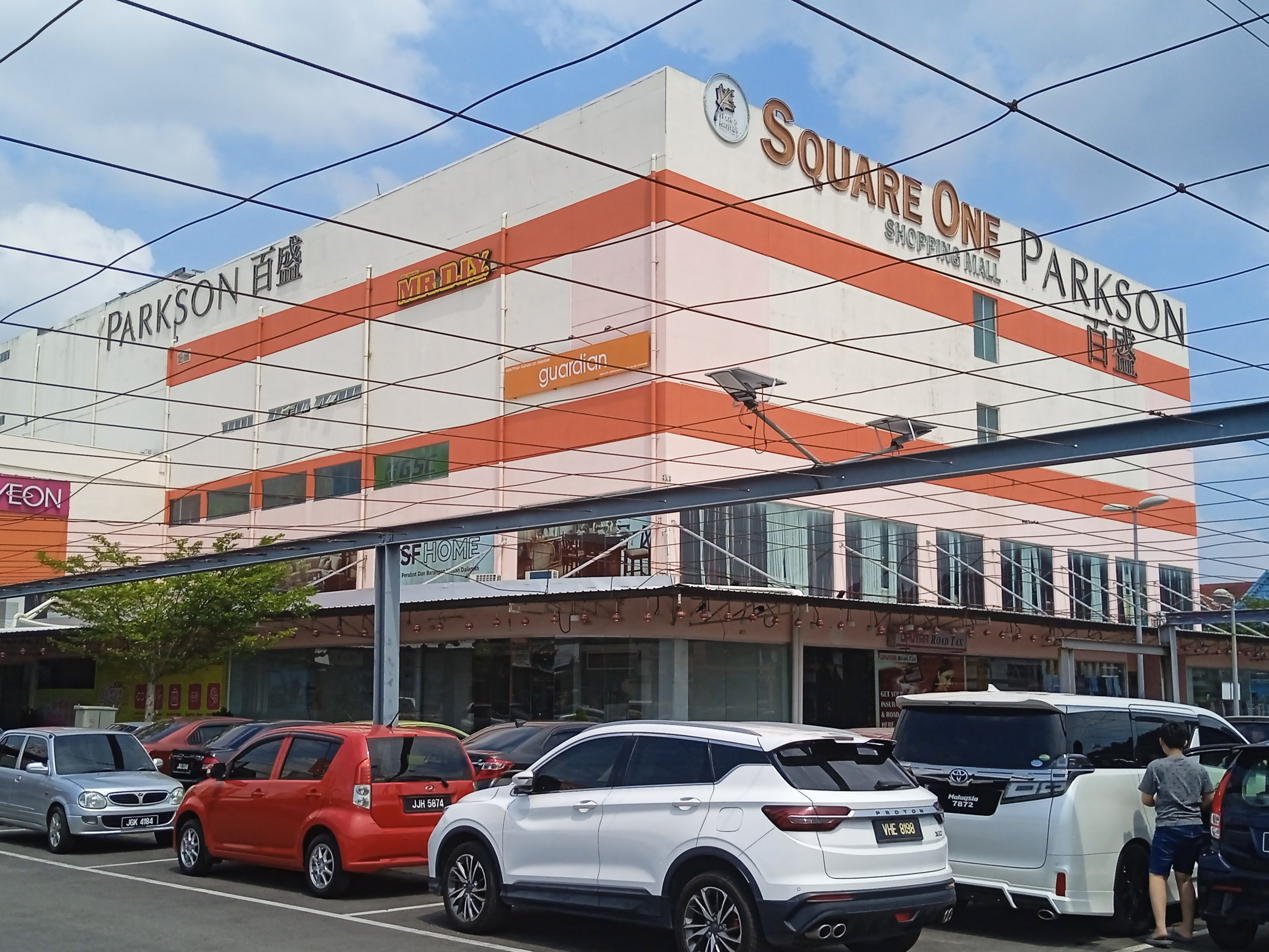
Outlook of Square One Mall

MBO Cinemaplex, the largest cinemaplex in Batu Pahat city

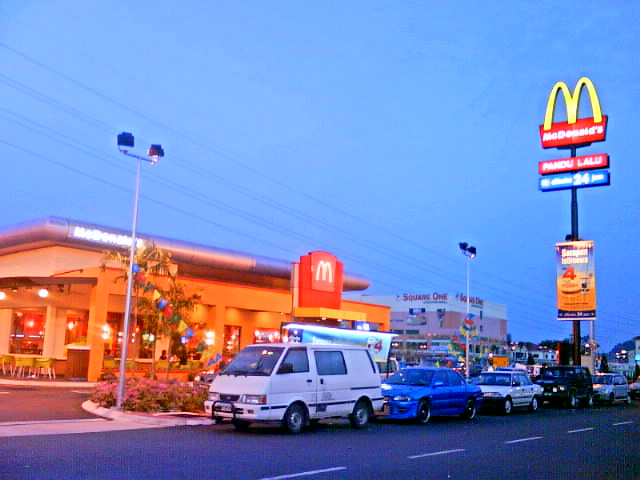
Batu Pahat first McDonald's drive-through, near Carrefour Batu Pahat and newly built Square One Shopping Mall

Taman Flora Utama (Jawi: تامن فلور اوتام; Chinese: 富贵城) is a township in Bandar Penggaram, Batu Pahat, Johor, Malaysia. It was constructed in 2005. Taman Flora Utama is located beside Jalan Tan Siew Hoe. The new township is developing rapidly. This township is mainly for shopping, leisure and commercial activities.

There are many shophouses in this township. Two shopping malls are also located in this township, a Carrefour hypermarket and the Square One Shopping Mall. There is a McDonald's drive-through. This township is under the control of Majlis Perbandaran Batu Pahat (MPBP).

== See also ==
- Batu Pahat
- Bandar Penggaram, Batu Pahat
- Majlis Perbandaran Batu Pahat
- SMK Tinggi Batu Pahat
- Taman Setia Jaya 2
- Pura Kencana
- Taman Bukit Pasir
- Segenting (石文丁)
- Pantai Minyak Beku
- Batu Pahat Mall
