= Malaysia Federal Route 50 =

Road in Malaysia

Federal Route 50
- Jalan Batu Pahat–Kluang–Mersing

Route information
- Maintained by Malaysian Public Works Department
- Length: 135.28 km (84.06 mi)
- Existed: 1911–present
- History: Completed in 1919

Major junctions
- West end: Batu Pahat
- FT 5 Federal Route 5 FT 1 Federal Route 1 North–South Expressway Southern Route / AH2; FT 173 Jalan Besar, Kluang; FT 172 Kluang Inner Ring Road; FT 91 Federal Route 91; FT 184 Jalan Padang Tembak, Kluang; FT 1397 Jalan Utama Nitar FT 3 (Federal Route 3) / AH18
- East end: Jemaluang

Location
- Country: Malaysia
- Primary destinations: Parit Raja, Ayer Hitam, Kluang, Kahang, Mersing

Highway system
- Highways in Malaysia; Expressways; Federal; State

Federal Route 50, or Jalan Batu Pahat–Kluang–Mersing, is a main federal road in Johor, Malaysia. The road connects Batu Pahat in the west to Jemaluang in the east. It is also a main route to North–South Expressway Southern Route via Ayer Hitam Interchange.

== Route background ==
The Kilometre Zero of the Federal Route 50 is located at Batu Pahat near Mount Soga, at its interchange with the Federal Route 5, the main trunk road of the west coast of Peninsular Malaysia.

== History ==
In 1911, the state government of Johor collaborated with the British colonial government to develop a road network from Johor Bahru to Batu Pahat and Muar. As a result, the Batu Pahat–Kluang–Mersing Road was completed in 1919, where the section of the Banang Roundabout to Mount Soga Intersection formed a part of the present-day Federal Route 5.

The road was partially upgraded on 2002 with a four-lane carriageway from Batu Pahat to Kluang. The rest of the road remains at two lanes.

On 13 January 2007, the Sungai Semberong bridge at Batu 5, Jalan Kluang–Mersing, collapsed during flash floods.

== Features ==
At most sections, the Federal Route 50 was built under the JKR R5 road standard, with a speed limit of 90 km/h.

There are signposts of monkeys and elephants in the Kahang–Kangkar Lenggor–Jemaluang section.

There is an alternative road connecting Kahang and Mersing which runs through Felda Nitar.

== Junctions and town lists ==
The entire route is located in Johor. The location on the table indicates sub-district.

Legend:

- I/C - Interchange, I/S - Intersection, RSA - Rest and service area, OBR - Overhead bridge restaurant, R/R - Restaurant and rest plaza, L/B - Layby, V/P - Vista point, TN - tunnel, T/P - Toll plaza, BR - Bridge
- C - Cloverleaf, S - Stack, T-A - Trumpet-A, T-B - Trumpet-B, DT - Directional-T/Y, SDT - Semi-Directional-T/Y, P-Y - Partial-Y, D - Diamond, P-C - Partial cloverleaf, D-D - Diverging diamond, D-R - Direct ramp

District	Location	km	mi	Exit	Name	Destinations	Notes
Batu Pahat	Batu Pahat	0.0	0.0		Batu Pahat; Mount Soga	FT 5 Malaysia Federal Route 5 – Malacca, Muar, Parit Jawa, Senggarang, Rengit, Pontian, Johor Bahru	T-junctions
Batu Pahat	Batu Pahat				Batu Pahat Golf and Country Club	Batu Pahat Golf and Country Club	T-junctions
Batu Pahat	Batu Pahat				Jalan Tan Swee Hoe	Jalan Tan Swee Hoe	T-junctions
Batu Pahat	Batu Pahat				Jalan Parit Besar	J202 Jalan Parit Besar	T-junctions
Batu Pahat	Batu Pahat				Taman Seri Soga	Taman Seri Soga	T-junctions
Batu Pahat	Batu Pahat				Batu Pahat Industrial Area	Batu Pahat Industrial Area – Sharp TV and radio assembly plant	T-junctions
Batu Pahat	Batu Pahat				Jalan Sengkuang	J125 Jalan Sengkuang – Sri Bengkal, Parit Yaani, Yong Peng	T-junctions
Batu Pahat	Batu Pahat				Sri Gading	Taman Sri Gading	T-junctions
Batu Pahat	Batu Pahat				UTHM	Tun Hussein Onn University of Malaysia (UTHM)	T-junctions
Batu Pahat	Batu Pahat				Sri Gading Industrial Area	Sri Gading Industrial Area	T-junctions
Batu Pahat	Batu Pahat				Sri Gading-WCE	West Coast Expressway	Under planning
Batu Pahat	Batu Pahat				Parit Raja	J121 Jalan Parit Raja Darat – Parit Botak, Rengit	Junctions
Batu Pahat	Batu Pahat				Jalan Parit Hamid–Parit Botak	J9 Jalan Parit Hamid–Parit Botak – Parit Botak, Rengit	T-junctions
Batu Pahat	Yong Peng				Kampung Parit Sonto	Kampung Parit Sonto (also known as Usop Sontorian village)	
Batu Pahat	Yong Peng				Ayer Hitam	FT 1 Malaysia Federal Route 1 – Segamat, Labis, Yong Peng, Machap, Simpang Renggam, Kulai, Johor Bahru, Tropical Village	Junctions
Batu Pahat	Yong Peng			Ayer Hitam RSA, Food and fruit stall, Pottery stall			
Batu Pahat	Yong Peng				Ayer Hitam-NSE	North–South Expressway Southern Route / AH2 – Kuala Lumpur, Malacca, Yong Peng, Machap, Simpang Renggam, Senai International Airport, Johor Bahru	T-junctions
Batu Pahat	Yong Peng				Ayer Hitam Animal Husbandry		
Kluang	Kluang				Kampung Melayu Batu Lima		
Kluang	Kluang				Pulau Kampung Batu Jalan Kluang		
Kluang	Kluang				Kampung Rahmat		
Kluang	Kluang				Kampung Sri Lalang Batu Enam		
Kluang	Kluang			Sungai Semberong bridge			
Kluang	Kluang				Puspakom Kluang		
Kluang	Kluang				Kampung Sri Lalang		
Kluang	Kluang				Kluang District Federal Building	Kluang District Federal Building (Bangunan Persekutuan Daerah Kluang)	
Kluang	Kluang				INTAN Southern Campus	National Institute of Public Administration/Institut Tadbiran Awam Negara (INTAN) Southern Campus – Main Gate	
Kluang	Kluang			Sungai Melantai bridge			
Kluang	Kluang				Bulatan Taman Emas	Jalan Emas – Taman Emas; FT 173 Jalan Besar, Kluang – Mengkibol	Roundabout
Kluang	Kluang			Railway crossing bridge			
Kluang	Kluang				Kluang		
Kluang	Kluang			Sungai Mengkibol bridge			
Kluang	Kluang				Kluang	Masjid Jamek Kluang	
Kluang	Kluang				Kluang	FT 172 Kluang Inner Ring Road – Kluang Hospital; J25 Jalan Kluang–Renggam – Mengkibol, Renggam, Simpang Renggam, Layang Layang	Junctions
Kluang	Kluang				Kluang		
Kluang	Kluang				Kluang	FT 172 Kluang Inner Ring Road – Kampung Melayu Niyor; Jalan Sekolah	Roundabout
Kluang	Kluang				Kluang; Kluang Baharu	FT 91 Jalan Abdullah – Bandar Tenggara, Kota Tinggi, Kulai	Junctions
Kluang	Kluang				Kluang; Kampung Paya		
Kluang	Kluang				Taman Ria		
Kluang	Kluang				SMK Sultan Abdul Jalil Kluang		
Kluang	Kluang				Taman Kasih	J16 Jalan Paloh – Paloh; FT 184 Jalan Padang Tembak, Kluang – Gunung Lambak	Junctions
Kluang	Kluang			Sungai Semberong bridge			
Kluang	Kluang				Mahkota Kluang Camp	Mahkota Kluang Camp (Pasukan Udara Tentera Darat)	
Kluang	Kluang				Kampung Semberong		
Kluang	Kluang				Kampung Gajah		
Kluang	Kluang				Kampung Sri Tambak	Padang Hijau (Agro-tourism)	T-junctions
Kluang	Kluang				Taman Perdana	Taman Perdana; J97 Jalan FELDA Kahang Timur – FELDA Kahang Timur, FELDA Hulu Dengar	Junctions
Kluang	Kluang				Pamol Golf and Country Club	Pamol Golf and Country Club	T-junctions
Kluang	Kluang				Kahang	Kampung Sri Lukut (Agro-tourism)	
Kluang	Kluang				Kampung Pinggir	Wildlife crossing	Under construction
Mersing	Mersing				Jalan Utama Nitar	FT 1397 Jalan Utama Nitar – FELDA Nitar 1, FELDA Nitar 2, Mersing, Kuantan	T-junctions
Mersing	Mersing				Kangkar Lenggor		
Mersing	Mersing	135.28	84.06		Mersing; Jemaluang	FT 3 (Malaysia Federal Route 3) / AH18 – Mersing, Kuantan, Kota Tinggi, Johor Bahru	T-junctions
1.000 mi = 1.609 km; 1.000 km = 0.621 mi: Proposed; Unopened
