= Johor State Route J121 =

Road in Johor, Malaysia

Johor Route 121
- Jalan Parit Raja Darat

Route information
- Length: 4.8 km (3.0 mi)

Major junctions
- North end: Parit Raja
- FT 50 Federal Route 50; J9 State Route J9
- South end: Kampung Parit Raja Darat

Location
- Country: Malaysia
- Primary destinations: Taman Rona 2

Highway system
- Highways in Malaysia; Expressways; Federal; State

Johor State Route J121, Jalan Parit Raja Darat is a major road in Johor, Malaysia.

== History ==
The Jalan Parit Raja Darat J121 used to be an alternative route for heavier vehicle during the Jalan Parit Hamid–Parit Botak J9 partial closure.

== Junction list ==
The entire route is located in Batu Pahat District, Johor.

Km	Exit	Name	Destinations	Notes
0.0		Parit Raja	Jalan Bahru – Taman Sedap; FT 50 Malaysia Federal Route 50 – Batu Pahat, Ayer Hitam, Kluang; North–South Expressway Southern Route / AH2 – Kuala Lumpur, Johor Bahru	Junctions
		Taman Rona 2	Jalan Rona – Taman Rona 2	T-junctions
	BR	Bridge		
		Jalan Hailam	Jalan Hailam – Parit Sempadan	T-junctions
4.8		Kampung Parit Raja Darat	J9 Johor State Route J9 – Parit Hamid, Ayer Hitam, Parit Botak, Senggarang, Rengit	T-junctions
