= SH6 =

SH6 may refer to:

- State Highway 6 (New Zealand)
- Texas State Highway 6
- Minnesota State Highway 6

== See also ==
- List of highways numbered 6
