= List of highways numbered 6 =

Route 6, or Highway 6, may refer to routes in the following countries:

== International ==
- Asian Highway 6
- European route E6
- European route E006

== Albania ==
- National Road SH6

== Argentina ==
- Buenos Aires Provincial Route 6

== Australia ==
=== New South Wales ===
- A6 (Sydney)

=== Queensland ===
- Logan Motorway
- Flinders Highway, Queensland

=== Tasmania ===
- Huon Highway

=== Proposals ===
- F6 Extension (Proposed)

== Austria ==
- Nordost Autobahn

== Bolivia ==
- National Route 6 (Bolivia)

== Bulgaria ==
- A6 motorway (Bulgaria)
- I-6 road (Bulgaria)

== Cambodia ==
- National Highway 6 (Cambodia)

== Canada ==
- Alberta Highway 6
- British Columbia Highway 6
- Manitoba Highway 6
- New Brunswick Route 6 (1927–1965)
- New Brunswick Route 6 (1965–1984)
- Northwest Territories Highway 6
- Nova Scotia Trunk 6
- Ontario Highway 6
- Prince Edward Island Route 6
- Quebec Route 6 (former)
- Saskatchewan Highway 6
- Yukon Highway 6 (Canol Road)

== China ==
- G6 Expressway

== Costa Rica ==
- National Route 6

== Czech Republic ==
- D6 Motorway
- I/6 Highway

== Djibouti ==
- RN-6 (Djibouti)

== Dominican Republic ==
- DR-12

== France ==
- Autoroute_A6 (french)

== Germany ==
- Bundesautobahn 6

== Greece ==
- A6 motorway (Attiki Odos)
- EO6 road

== Hong Kong ==
- Route 6 (Hong Kong)

== Hungary ==
- M6 motorway (Hungary)
- Main road 6 (Hungary)

== India ==
- National Highway 6 (India)

== Indonesia ==
- Indonesian National Route 6

== Iran ==
- Freeway 6 (Iran)

== Iraq ==
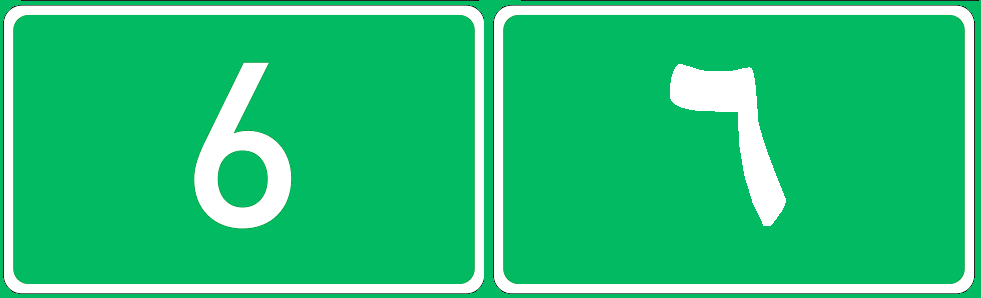
- Highway 6 (Iraq)

== Ireland ==
- M6 motorway (Republic of Ireland)
- N6 road (Ireland)

== Israel ==
- Highway 6 (Israel)

== Italy ==
- Autostrada A6
- RA 6

== Japan ==
- National Route 6
- Jōban Expressway
- Sanriku Expressway
- Sendai-Hokubu Road
- Sendai-Tōbu Road
- Route 6 (Nagoya Expressway)

== Korea, South ==
- National Route 6

== Malaysia ==
- North–South Expressway Central Link
- FT 6 Malaysia Federal Route 6
- J6 Johor State Route J6
- N6 Negeri Sembilan State Route N6

== New Zealand ==
- State Highway 6 (New Zealand)

== Nigeria ==
- Nigeria Trunk Road A6

== Paraguay ==
- National Route 6

== Philippines ==
- C-6 Circumferential Road 2
- R-6 Radial Road 6
- N6 highway (Philippines)
- E6 expressway (Philippines)

== Romania ==
- Drumul Naţional 6
- A6 motorway (Romania)

== Russia ==
- M6 highway (Russia)

== Taiwan ==
- National Freeway 6

== Thailand ==
- Motorway 6 (Thailand)

== Ukraine ==
- Highway M06 (Ukraine)

== United Kingdom ==
- M6 motorway
- M6 Toll
- A6 road (England)
- A6 road (Isle of Man)
- A6 road (Northern Ireland)

== United States ==
- U.S. Route 6
- New England Interstate Route 6 (former)
  - New England Route 6B
- Alabama State Route 6 (former)
  - County Route 6 (Lee County, Alabama)
- Alaska Route 6
- Arkansas Highway 6 (former)
- California State Route 6 (former)
  - County Route A6 (California)
  - County Route D6 (California)
  - County Route E6 (California)
  - County Route G6 (California)
  - County Route J6 (California)
  - County Route J6 (California)
  - County Route S6 (California)
- Delaware Route 6
- Florida State Road 6
  - County Road 6 (Columbia County, Florida)
- Georgia State Route 6
- Idaho State Highway 6
- Illinois Route 6
- Indiana State Road 6 (former)
- K-6 (Kansas highway)
- Kentucky Route 6
- Louisiana Highway 6
  - Louisiana State Route 6 (former)
- Maine State Route 6
- Maryland Route 6
- M-6 (Michigan highway)
- Minnesota State Highway 6
  - County Road 6 (Dakota County, Minnesota)
  - County Road 6 (Goodhue County, Minnesota)
  - County Road 6 (Hennepin County, Minnesota)
  - County Road 6 (Ramsey County, Minnesota)
  - County Road 6 (St. Louis County, Minnesota)
  - County Road 6 (Washington County, Minnesota)
- Mississippi Highway 6
- Missouri Route 6
- Nevada State Route 6 (former)
  - Nevada State Route 6B (former)
  - Nevada State Route 6C (former)
- New Jersey Route 6 (former)
  - County Route 6 (Monmouth County, New Jersey)
    - County Route 6B (Monmouth County, New Jersey)
- New Mexico State Road 6
- New York State Route 6 (1924–1927) (former)
  - County Route 6 (Albany County, New York)
  - County Route 6 (Allegany County, New York)
  - County Route 6 (Cattaraugus County, New York)
  - County Route 6 (Chautauqua County, New York)
  - County Route 6 (Chenango County, New York)
  - County Route 6 (Dutchess County, New York)
  - County Route 6 (Erie County, New York)
  - County Route 6 (Franklin County, New York)
  - County Route 6 (Genesee County, New York)
  - County Route 6 (Greene County, New York)
  - County Route 6 (Hamilton County, New York)
  - County Route 6 (Jefferson County, New York)
  - County Route 6 (Madison County, New York)
  - County Route 6 (Niagara County, New York)
  - County Route 6 (Oneida County, New York)
  - County Route 6 (Ontario County, New York)
  - County Route 6 (Orange County, New York)
  - County Route 6 (Oswego County, New York)
  - County Route 6 (Rensselaer County, New York)
  - County Route 6 (Schoharie County, New York)
  - County Route 6 (Schuyler County, New York)
  - County Route 6 (St. Lawrence County, New York)
  - County Route 6 (Steuben County, New York)
  - County Route 6 (Suffolk County, New York)
  - County Route 6 (Tioga County, New York)
- North Carolina Highway 6 (former)
- North Dakota Highway 6
- Ohio State Route 6 (1923-1927) (former)
  - Ohio State Route 6 (1927) (former)
  - Ohio State Route 6 (pre-1931) (former)
- Oklahoma State Highway 6
- Oregon Route 6
- Pennsylvania Route 6 (former)
- Rhode Island Route 6
- South Carolina Highway 6
- Tennessee State Route 6
- Texas State Highway 6
  - Texas State Highway Loop 6 (former)
  - Texas State Highway Spur 6
  - Farm to Market Road 6
  - Texas Park Road 6
  - Texas Recreational Road 6
- Utah State Route 6
- Virginia State Route 6
- Washington State Route 6
  - Washington State Highway 6 (former)
- West Virginia Route 6

Territories

- American Samoa Highway 006
- Guam Highway 6
- Puerto Rico Highway 6

== Uruguay ==
- Route 6 Joaquín Suárez

== Zambia ==
- T6 road (Zambia)
- M6 road (Copperbelt)

== See also ==
- List of A6 roads
- List of highways numbered 6A

| Preceded by 5 | Lists of highways 6 | Succeeded by 7 |
