= Malaysia Federal Route 173 =

Road in Malaysia

Federal Route 173
- Jalan Besar, Kluang (Kluang Middle Ring Road)

Route information
- Maintained by Malaysian Public Works Department
- Length: 2.87 km (1.78 mi)

Major junctions
- West end: Bulatan Taman Emas
- FT 50 Federal Route 50; J25 Jalan Kluang–Renggam; FT 91 Federal Route 91
- East end: Kampung Masjid

Location
- Country: Malaysia
- Primary destinations: Mengkibol

Highway system
- Highways in Malaysia; Expressways; Federal; State

Jalan Besar, Kluang, or Kluang Middle Ring Road, Federal Route 173, is a federal road in Kluang town, Johor, Malaysia.

== Features ==
At most sections, the Federal Route 173 was built under the JKR R5 road standard, allowing maximum speed limit of up to 90 km/h.

== List of junctions ==
Km	Exit	Junctions	To	Remarks
		Bulatan Taman Emas	Northwest; Jalan Emas; Taman Emas West; FT 50 Ayer Hitam; FT 50 Batu Pahat; FT 1 Yong Peng; North–South Expressway Southern Route AH2 North–South Expressway Southern Route; Kuala Lumpur; Johor Bahru East; FT 50 Kluang town centre FT 50 Jemaluang; FT 3 AH18 Mersing	Roundabout
		Kluang Lake Gardens	Kluang Lake Gardens	
		Kluang Country Club		
		Jalan Kluang–Renggam	J25 Jalan Kluang–Renggam North; Town Centre; Kluang Railway Stations South; Mengkibol; Renggam; Simpang Renggam; Layang Layang	Junctions
		Railway crossing		
		Sungai Mengkibol bridge		
		Bulatan Lambak roundabout	Northwest; Jalan Lambak; Town Centre Southeast; Jalan Yap Tau Sah; Kampung Baharu Yap Tau Sah	Roundabout
		Kampung Masjid	FT 91 Jalan Abdullah North; FT 91 Kluang town centre FT 50 Jemaluang; FT 3 AH18 Mersing South; FT 91 Bandar Tenggara; FT 91 Kota Tinggi; FT 93 Kulai	T-junctions
