= Johor State Route J25 =

Road in Malaysia

Johor Route 25
- Jalan Kluang–Renggam / Jalan Mengkibol

Major junctions
- North end: Kluang
- FT 172 Kluang Inner Ring Road; FT 50 Federal Route 50; FT 173 Federal Route 173; FT 184 Federal Route 184; J26 State Route J26; J6 State Route J6
- South end: Renggam

Location
- Country: Malaysia
- Primary destinations: Mengkibol, Simpang Renggam, Layang Layang

Highway system
- Highways in Malaysia; Expressways; Federal; State

Johor State Route J25, Jalan Kluang–Renggam or Jalan Mengkibol is a major road in Johor, Malaysia.

== Features ==
=== Overlaps ===
Route shield	Route name	Location	Note
FT 50	Malaysia Federal Route 50	Kluang	Batu Pahat Direction

== Junctions lists ==
The entire route is located in Johor.

District	Km	Exit	Name	Destinations	Notes
Kluang			Kluang	FT 172 Kluang Inner Ring Road – Hospital Kluang; FT 50 Malaysia Federal Route 50 – Batu Pahat, Ayer Hitam, Yong Peng, Paloh, Kahang, Mersing; North–South Expressway Southern Route / AH2 – Kuala Lumpur, Johor Bahru	Junctions
Kluang			Kluang	FT 173 Malaysia Federal Route 173 – Batu Pahat, Ayer Hitam, Yong Peng, Bandar Tenggara, Kota Tinggi; North–South Expressway Southern Route / AH2 – Kuala Lumpur, Johor Bahru	Junctions
Kluang			Mengkibol	FT 184 Malaysia Federal Route 184 – Gunung Lambak, Bandar Tenggara, Kota Tinggi	T-junctions
Kluang			Kampung Sungai Sayong		
Kluang			Renggam	J26 Johor State Route J26 – Simpang Renggam; North–South Expressway Southern Route / AH2 – Kuala Lumpur, Johor Bahru	T-junctions
Kluang		BR	Railway crossing bridge		
Kluang			Layang Layang		T-junctions
Kulai			Murni Jaya		
Kulai			Jalan Layang Layang	J6 Johor State Route J6 – Bukit Batu, Sedenak, Kulai; North–South Expressway Southern Route / AH2 – Kuala Lumpur, Johor Bahru	T-junctions
Kulai			Jalan MCA	Jalan MCA – Tenggara, Kota Tinggi	T-junctions
Through to J103 Jalan Sedenak
