= Johor State Route J9 =

Road in Malaysia

Johor Route 9
- Jalan Parit Hamid–Parit Botak

Major junctions
- North end: Parit Hamid
- FT 50 Federal Route 50; FT 5 Federal Route 5
- South end: Kampung Ceruk, Parit Botak

Location
- Country: Malaysia
- Primary destinations: Parit Raja, Parit Botak, Rengit

Highway system
- Highways in Malaysia; Expressways; Federal; State

Johor State Route J9, Jalan Parit Hamid–Parit Botak is a major road in Johor, Malaysia.

== History ==
The State Route J9 Jalan Parit Hamid–Parit Botak becomes one of the E32 West Coast Expressway southern extensions proposed interchanges in Johor alignment.

The cracks identified at Kampung Parit Haji Ali, section 5.00. As the result, the JKR Batu Pahat closed for repairing.

On 20 June 2025, the heavier vehicles are restricted to crossing State Route J9/Jalan Parit Botak, heavier vehicles are required to use alternatives routes J121 State Route J121/Jalan Parit Raja Darat.

At 9.00 am 19 November 2025, an accident involved a Perodua Viva and Honda RS150 motorcycle crashed at Senggarang, the Perodua Viva driver killed in this accident.

== Junction lists ==
The entire route is located in Batu Pahat District, Johor.

Legend:

- I/C - Interchange, I/S - Intersection, RSA - Rest and service area, OBR - Overhead bridge restaurant, R/R - Restaurant and rest plaza, L/B - Layby, V/P - Vista point, TN - tunnel, T/P - Toll plaza, BR - Bridge
- C - Cloverleaf, S - Stack, T-A - Trumpet-A, T-B - Trumpet-B, DT - Directional-T/Y, SDT - Semi-Directional-T/Y, P-Y - Partial-Y, D - Diamond, P-C - Partial cloverleaf, D-D - Diverging diamond, D-R - Direct ramp

Location	km	mi	Name	Destinations	Notes
Parit Hamid			Parit Hamid	FT 50 Malaysia Federal Route 50 – Batu Pahat, Parit Raja, Ayer Hitam, Kluang, Mersing; North–South Expressway Southern Route / AH2 – Kuala Lumpur, Malacca, Johor Bahru	T-junctions
Parit Hamid			Kampung Parit Raja Darat	J121 Johor State Route J121 – Parit Raja, Batu Pahat	T-junctions
Parit Hamid			Kampung Bahru		
Parit Botak			Jalan Rejo Sari	J202 Jalan Rejo Sari – Parit Wagiman	T-junctions
Parit Botak			Parit Botak-WCE	West Coast Expressway	Under planning
Parit Botak			Parit Botak	J122 Jalan Parit Kemang – Senggarang, Batu Pahat	T-junctions
Parit Botak			Parit Botak; Kampung Ceruk	FT 5 Malaysia Federal Route 5 – Malacca, Muar, Batu Pahat, Rengit, Benut, Pontian, Kukup; Jalan Kampung Parit Hailam – Kampung Parit Hailam	Junctions
1.000 mi = 1.609 km; 1.000 km = 0.621 mi: Proposed
