= Square One Shopping Mall =

Square One Shopping Mall may refer to:

- Square One Shopping Centre, a shopping mall in Mississauga, Ontario, Canada
- Square One Mall, a shopping mall in Saugus, Massachusetts, USA
- Square One Shopping Mall (Batu Pahat), a shopping mall in Taman Flora Utama, Bandar Penggaram, Malaysia
