= Johor State Route J26 =

Road in Malaysia

Johor Route 26
- Jalan Simpang Renggam

Route information
- Maintained by Malaysian Public Works Department (JKR) Johor
- Length: 12.0 km (7.5 mi)

Major junctions
- West end: Simpang Renggam, Johor
- FT 1 Federal Route 1 J25 State Route J25
- East end: Renggam, Johor

Location
- Country: Malaysia
- Primary destinations: Mengkibol, Layang-Layang

Highway system
- Highways in Malaysia; Expressways; Federal; State

Johor State Route J26, Jalan Simpang Renggam is a major road in Johor, Malaysia. The 12 km (7.5 mi) state road connects Federal Route 1 at Simpang Renggam and State Route J25 at Renggam. The State Route J26 is also one of the deadliest roads in Johor.

== History ==
=== Glow in the Dark ===
The implementation of photo-luminescent road marking technology along Jalan Simpang Renggam J26 in the Simpang Renggam constituency marks a significant technological advancement in the infrastructural development of Johor, Malaysia. Initiated as a pilot project by the state's Public Works Department (JKR) and inspected by Menteri Besar of Johor and State Assemblyman for Machap Dato' Onn Hafiz Ghazi, the initiative features a specialized glow-in-the-dark compound sourced from France. Applied along an experimental 400-to-490-meter stretch of the corridor, the technology functions by absorbing solar energy during daylight hours and emitting a bright luminescent green glow at night. The primary objective of the deployment is to mitigate high accident rates by enhancing driver visibility and focus along unlit, winding, or structurally hazardous rural routes where traditional grid-tied street lighting is economically or logistically unfeasible. Following the success of the J26 installation, the state government formalised plans to scale the initiative across 31 high-risk road corridors spanning nine administrative districts, supported by a dedicated RM1 million allocation in the state budget alongside federal funds for complementary rural safety infrastructure.

=== Simpang Renggam accident ===
On 1 June 2026, an accident involved five vehicles (BMW 530e, Perodua Alza, Toyota Vios, Proton Wira and Mercedes Benz A250) caused by two cars Mercedes Benz A250 and BMW 530e illegally overtaking, collided in front of the Simpang Renggam Prison junctions, leading a family of four from Terengganu in Toyota Vios and BMW 530e driver killed in this accident, two injured and five escaped without injury.

The 19-year-old Mercedes Benz A250 driver arrested by Royal Malaysia Police (RMP/PDRM) for investigations.

== Features ==
- First 'Glow in the Dark' road in Johor

== Junction lists ==
The entire route is located in Kluang District, Johor.

Location	km	mi	Name	Destinations	Notes
Simpang Renggam			Simpang Renggam	FT 1 Malaysia Federal Route 1 – Segamat, Yong Peng, Ayer Hitam, Batu Pahat, Machap, Kulai, Kota Tinggi, Senai, Johor Bahru, Benut, Pontian; North–South Expressway Southern Route / AH2 – Kuala Lumpur, Johor Bahru	T-junctions
Simpang Renggam			Berambong River Bridge		
Simpang Renggam			Kampung Chokro		
Simpang Renggam			Kampung Batu 6½	Jalan Kompleks Penghulu	T-junctions
Simpang Renggam			Taman Renggam Jaya	Jalan Berlian – Taman Renggam Jaya	T-junctions
Simpang Renggam			Simpang Renggam Prison		T-junctions
Simpang Renggam			Fatal Accident Area		
Simpang Renggam			5th Batallion General Operations Force		T-junctions
Renggam			SD Guthrie Estate		
Renggam			Renggam	J25 Johor State Route J25 – Kluang, Mengkibol, Mersing, Layang-Layang	T-junctions
1.000 mi = 1.609 km; 1.000 km = 0.621 mi: Incomplete access
