= List of A6 roads =

This is a list of roads designated A6.

- A006 road (Argentina), a road connecting Las Cuevas with the Christ the Redeemer monument in the border between Argentina and Chile
- A6 highway (Australia) may refer to:
  - A6 (Sydney), a road connecting Carlingford and Heathcote
  - A6 highway (Queensland), a road connecting Townsville and Cloncurry
  - Sir Donald Bradman Drive, a road connecting the Adelaide central business district with Adelaide Airport
  - A6 highway (Tasmania) may refer to:
    - Huon Highway, a road connecting the south of Tasmania to the state capital - Hobart.
    - Southern Outlet, a road connecting the Huon Highway and the Kingston Bypass to the Hobart central business district.
    - Davey and Macquarie Streets form a Couplet through the Hobart CBD connecting the Southern Outlet with the A3 and (1) Highways.
- A6 motorway (Austria), a road connecting Slovakia to the Austrian motorway system
- A6 motorway (Bulgaria), a road connecting Sofia and Pernik
- A6 motorway (Croatia), a highway connecting Rijeka and Zagreb in Croatia
- A6 motorway (Cyprus), a road connecting Paphos to Limassol
- A6 motorway (France), a road connecting Paris and Lyon
- A6 motorway (Germany), a road connecting Saarbrücken near the French border and Waidhaus near the Czech border
- A6 motorway (Italy), a road connecting Turin and Savona
- A6 road (Latvia), a road connecting Riga and Daugavpils - Krāslava - Belarusian border (Pāternieki)
- A6 highway (Lithuania), a road connecting Kaunas and Zarasai–Daugavpils
- A6 motorway (Luxembourg), a road connecting the Belgian A4 to Luxembourg City
- A6 motorway (Netherlands), a road connecting the A1 motorway at interchange Muiderberg with the A7 motorway at interchange Joure
- A6 autostrada (Poland), a motorway near Szczecin
- A-6 motorway (Spain), a road connecting Madrid and A Coruña
- A 6 road (Sri Lanka), a road connecting Ambepussa and Trincomalee
- A6 road (United Kingdom) may refer to:
  - A6 road (England), a road connecting Luton with Carlisle
  - A6 road (Isle of Man), a road connecting Douglas with the A5
  - A6 road (Northern Ireland), a road connecting Belfast with Derry
- A6 road (United States of America) may refer to:
  - County Route A6 (California), a road in Tehama County connecting Dales (Malton Road) and Forward Road, crossed by State Route 36
- A6 road (Zimbabwe), a road connecting Beitbridge and Bulawayo
- A6 motorway (Romania), a road planned to connect Bucharest to Lugoj

== See also ==
- List of highways numbered 6
