= Tropical Village =

Theme park in Batu Pahat, Johor, Malaysia

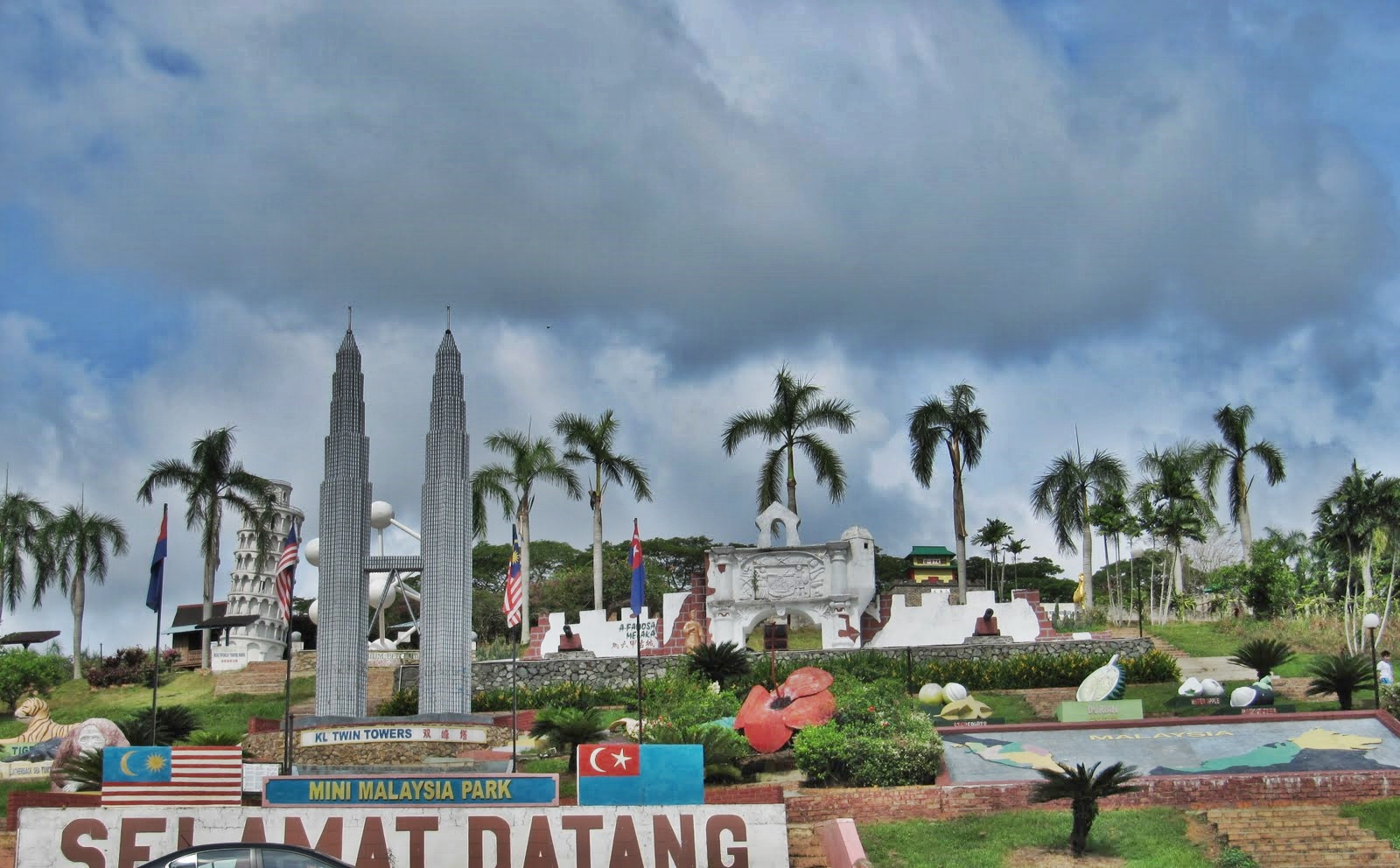
- Interactive map of Tropical Village
- Location: Ayer Hitam, Batu Pahat, Johor, Malaysia
- Coordinates: 1°53′53.9″N 103°12′26.1″E
- Status: Defunct
- Theme: World landmarks

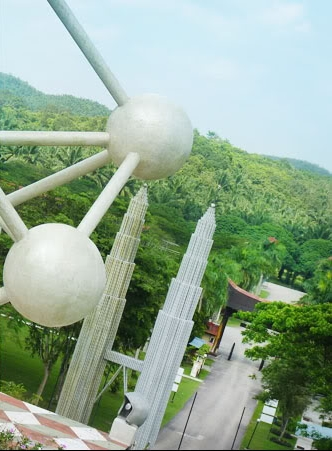
Tallest model in the park Petronas Towers, Kuala Lumpur, Malaysia

Tropical Village is an abandoned miniature amusement theme park in Ayer Hitam, Batu Pahat District, Johor, Malaysia.

== Park Attractions ==
Tropical Village contains replicas of famous structures and activities. The replicas are built within the 32-acre (13 ha) theme park, which is divided into four sections: Landmarks, the Leisure Corner, the Playground and the Agricultural Enclosure.

The Landmarks section is a garden with famous landmarks from around the world. It contains a section dedicated to Malay culture like Kompang sculptures and Kuda Kepang. It also has a Mini Malaysia section, which contains replicas of the Petronas Towers, A Famosa Fort, and Mini World.

The Leisure Corner is targeted to young visitors with its haunted house, the house of mirrors, and the dinosaur train, amongst other attractions.

The Playground is another children-oriented section of the park. It includes attractions such as the Oriental Island, the Pet Corner and the Garden of the Shy Monkey.

The park contains dormitories for visitors who want to stay overnight.

== List of major attractions in the Mini World, Tropical Village ==
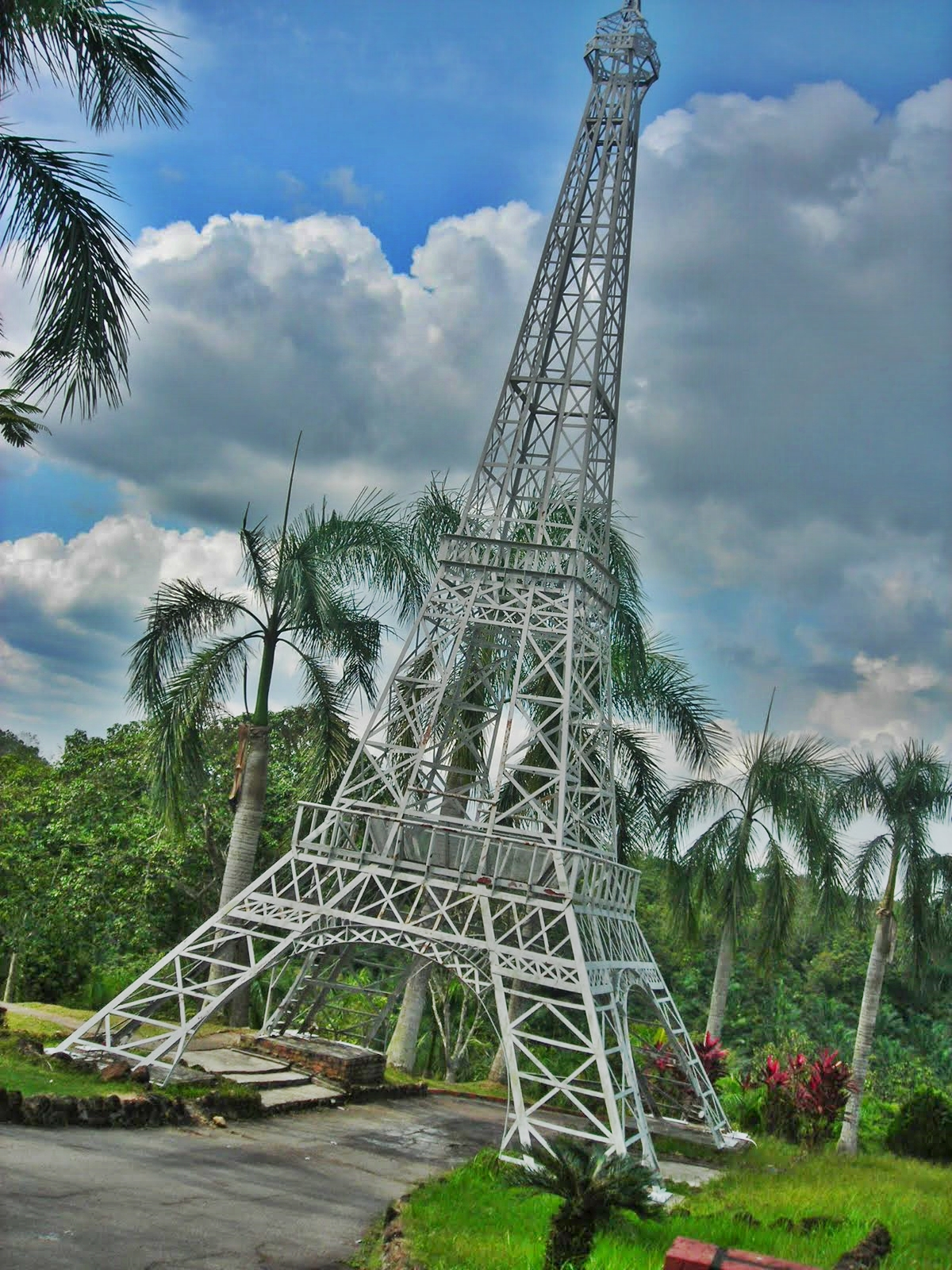
Miniature Eiffel Tower

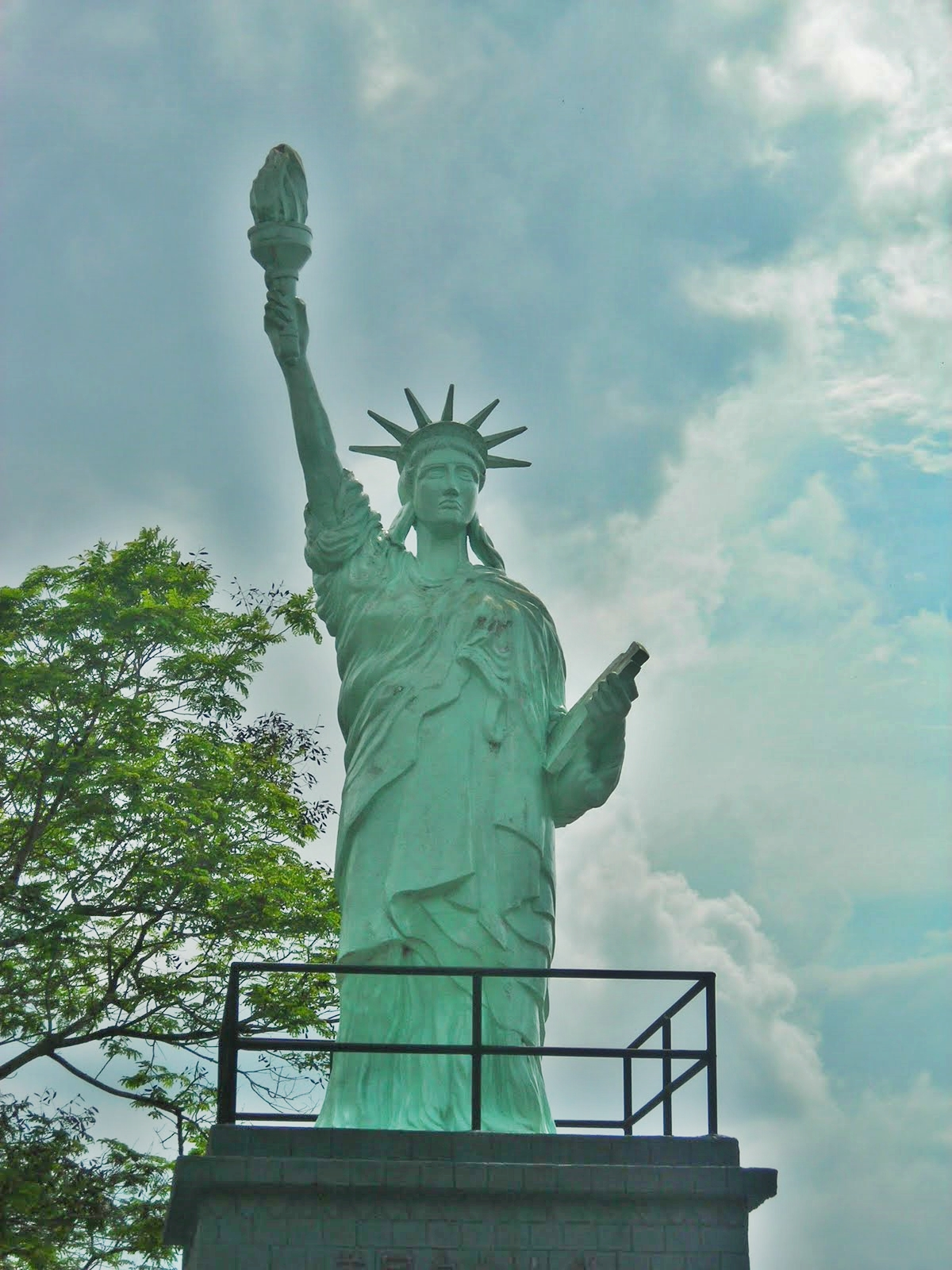
Miniature Statue of Liberty

=== Europe & USA region ===
- Leaning Tower of Pisa - Italy
- Statue of Liberty - USA
- Colosseum - Italy
- Eiffel Tower - France
- Hollywood Sign - USA
- Windmills - Netherlands
- The Little Mermaid (statue) - Denmark
- Atomium - Belgium

=== Asia region ===
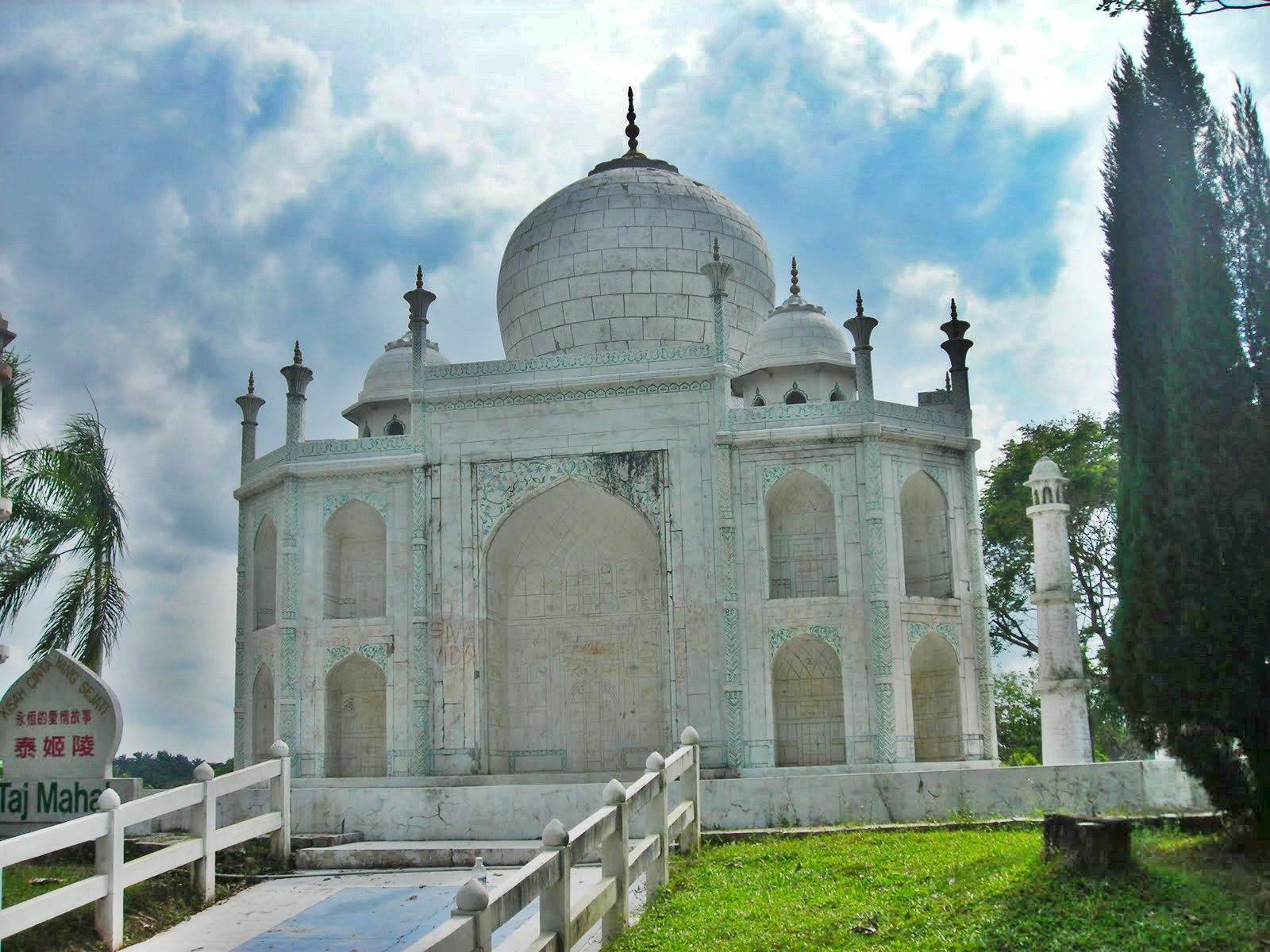
Miniature Taj Mahal

- Great Wall of China - China
- Sigiriya Lion Rock - Sri Lanka
- Wat Pho Reclining Buddha - Thailand
- Borobudur - Indonesia
- Merlion - Singapore
- Taj Mahal - India
- Kuwait Towers - Kuwait
- Giza & Sphinx - Egypt

=== Other famous replicas ===
- Moai sculpture - Easter Island
- Japan kokeshi - Japan
- Olmec head - Mexico
- Budai - Chinese God
- Bruce Lee Sculpture - Hong Kong
- Jeju Island Sculpture - South Korea

== Transportation ==
The theme park is accessible by bus from Larkin Sentral (2, 888) in Johor Bahru.

== See also ==
- List of tourist attractions in Malaysia
