= Kluang Inner Ring Road =

Road in Malaysia

Federal Route 172
- Kluang Inner Ring Road

Route information
- Maintained by Malaysian Public Works Department
- Length: 2.60 km (1.62 mi)

Major junctions
- Southwest end: FT 50 Jalan Batu Pahat-Mersing
- J25 State Route J25; FT 50 Federal Route 50; J191 State Route J191
- Southeast end: Jalan Sekolah Roundabout

Location
- Country: Malaysia
- Primary destinations: Kluang Hospital, Kampung Melayu Niyor

Highway system
- Highways in Malaysia; Expressways; Federal; State

Kluang Inner Ring Road comprising Jalan Hospital, Jalan Rambutan and Jalan Mohd Salim, Federal Route 172 (formerly Johor State Route J191), is a federal road in Kluang town, Johor, Malaysia.

== Features ==
At most sections, the Federal Route 172 was built under the JKR R5 road standard, allowing maximum speed limit of up to 90 km/h (56 mph).

== Junction lists ==
The entire route is located in Kluang District, Johor.

Legend:

- I/C - Interchange, I/S - Intersection, RSA - Rest and service area, OBR - Overhead bridge restaurant, R/R - Restaurant and rest plaza, L/B - Layby, V/P - Vista point, TN - tunnel, T/P - Toll plaza, BR - Bridge
- C - Cloverleaf, S - Stack, T-A - Trumpet-A, T-B - Trumpet-B, DT - Directional-T/Y, SDT - Semi-Directional-T/Y, P-Y - Partial-Y, D - Diamond, P-C - Partial cloverleaf, D-D - Diverging diamond, D-R - Direct ramp

Location	km	mi	Name	Destinations	Notes
Kluang			Jalan Batu Pahat–Mersing	FT 50 Malaysia Federal Route 50 – Ayer Hitam, Batu Pahat, Yong Peng, Paloh, Kahang, Mersing; North–South Expressway Southern Route / AH2 – Kuala Lumpur, Johor Bahru; J25 Johor State Route J25 – Mengkibol, Renggam, Simpang Renggam, Layang-Layang	Junctions
Kluang			Sekolah Agama Bandar Kluang		
Kluang			Kluang railway station		
Kluang			Kluang Hospital	Kluang Hospital	
Kluang			Railway crossing bridge		
Kluang			Jalan Haji Manan	Jalan Haji Manan – Taman Suria, Taman Lian Seng, Town Centre	T-junctions
Kluang			Jalan Haji Ithnin Maarof	J191 Jalan Haji Ithnin Maarof – Kampung Melayu Niyor	T-junctions
Kluang			Sungai Mengkibol bridge		
Kluang			Jalan Penghulu Kassim	Jalan Penghulu Kassim – Town Centre	T-junctions
Kluang			Jalan Sekolah Roundabout	FT 50 Malaysia Federal Route 50 – Ayer Hitam, Batu Pahat, Yong Peng, Paloh, Kahang, Mersing; North–South Expressway Southern Route / AH2 – Kuala Lumpur, Johor Bahru; Jalan Sekolah – Taman Kurnia	Roundabout
1.000 mi = 1.609 km; 1.000 km = 0.621 mi
