= Jemaluang =

Coordinates: 2°17′N 103°52′E

- Mukim

Other transcription(s)
  - Jawi: جيملواڠ
  - Chinese: 三板头 / 任罗宏
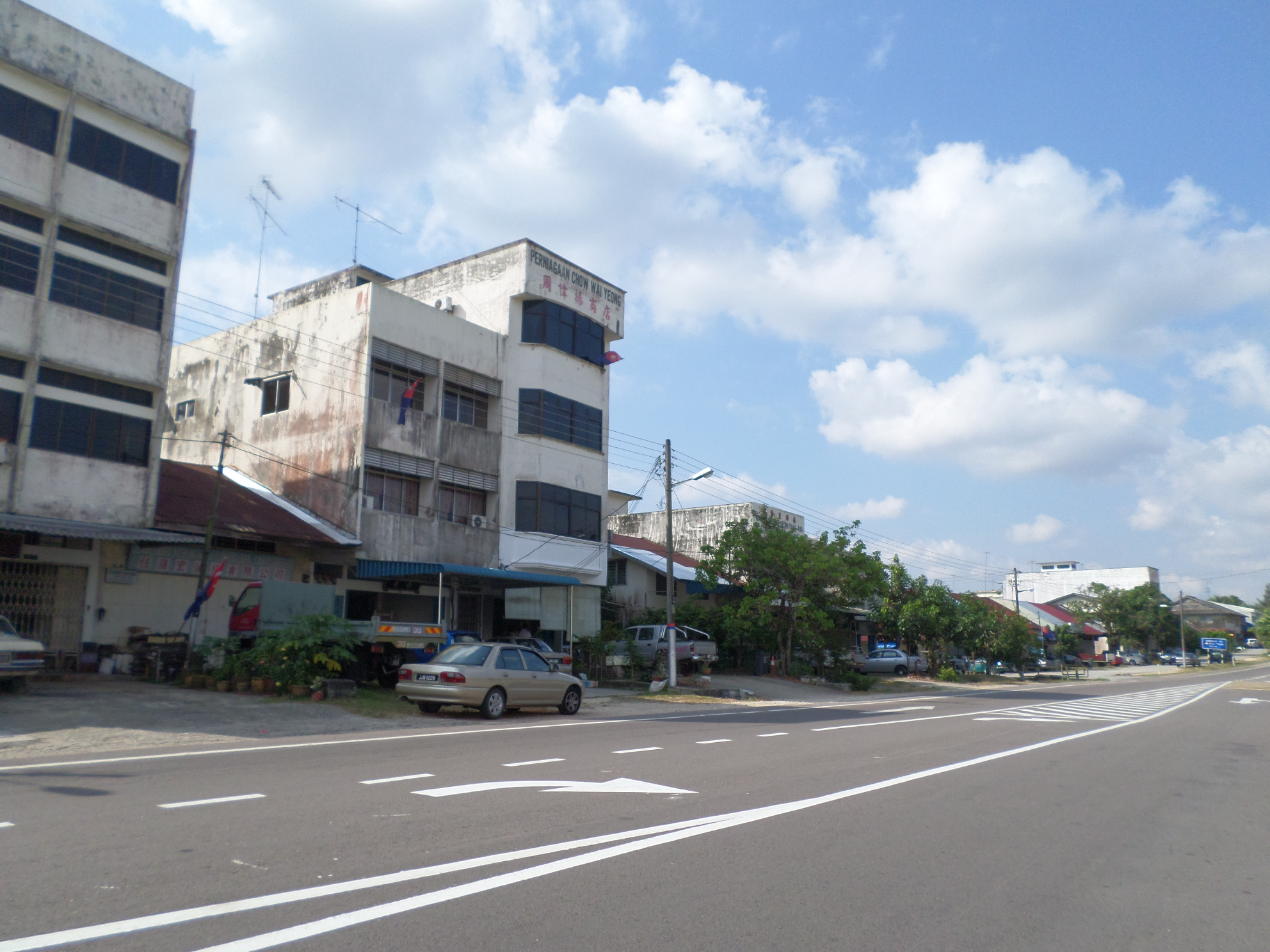
- Interactive map of Jemaluang
- Country: Malaysia
- State: Johor
- District: Mersing District

Area
  - Total: 124 km^{2} (48 sq mi)

Jemaluang is a town and mukim in Mersing District, Johor, Malaysia.

== Geography ==
Jemaluang in Mersing District

Jemaluang lies on the intersection of national highway 3 and 50.

The mukim (commune) surrounding the town spans over an area of 124 km^{2} and also includes 10 nearby villages.

== Geology ==
The mukim also includes Belunak Island. Jemaluang is not located in mukim Jemaluang.

== Gallery ==
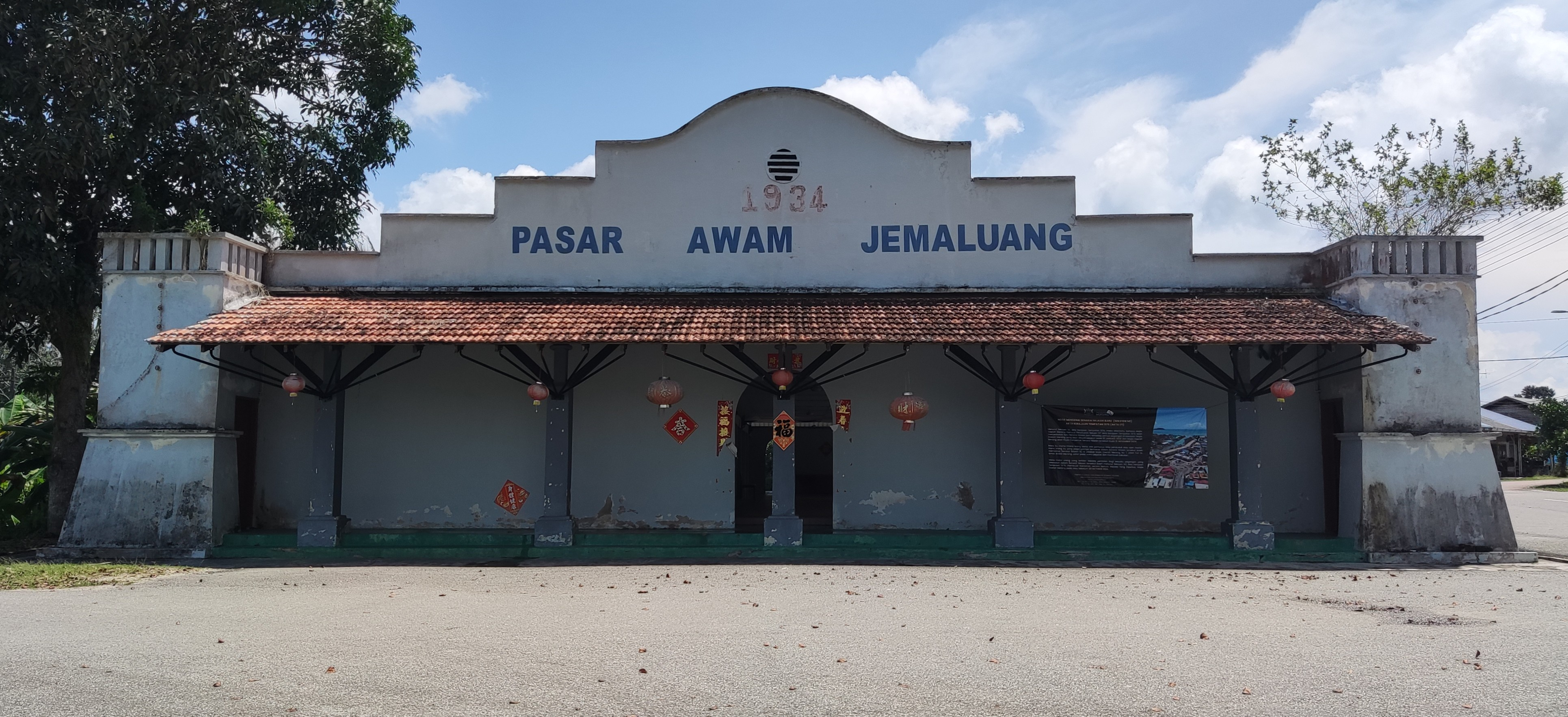
Marketplace of Jemaluang

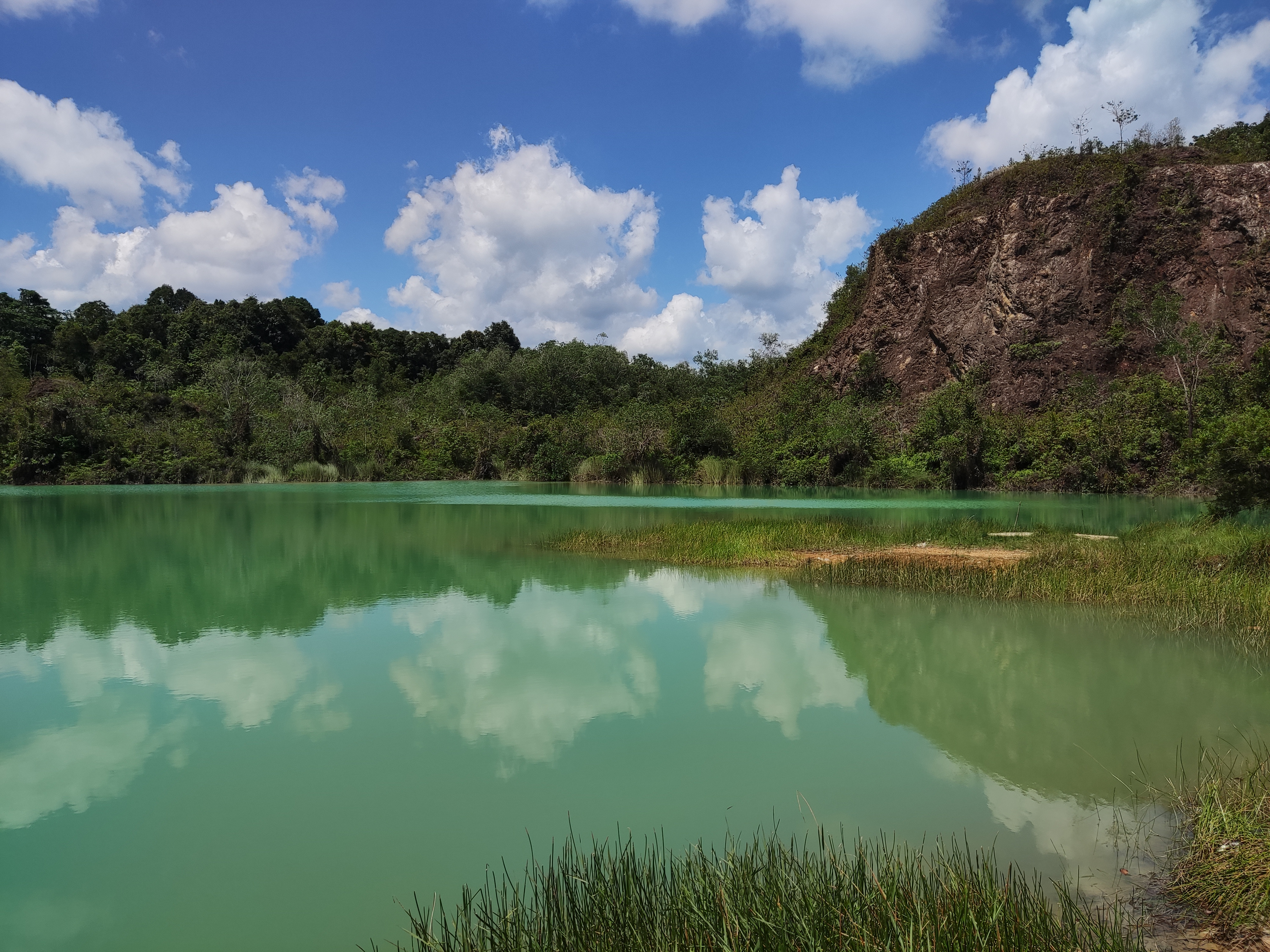
Emerald Lake of Jemaluang
