= Batu Pahat Municipal Council =

Batu Pahat Municipal Council Majlis Perbandaran Batu Pahat
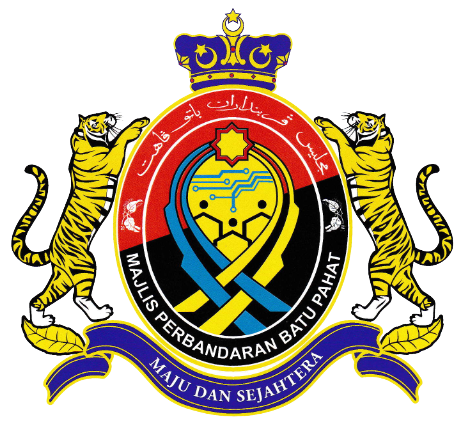
- Emblem

Type
- Type: Local authority of Batu Pahat

History
- Founded: 1 January 2001
- Preceded by: West Batu Pahat District Council

Leadership
- President: Mohd Nazid Jasiman (since 16 October 2025)
- Secretary: Abd Razak Ithnain

Structure
- Seats: 24
- Political groups: Councillors: BN (24): UMNO (14); MCA (8); MIC (2)
- Length of term: 1 April 2024–31 December 2025

Motto
- Maju dan Sejahtera (Progress and Prosper)

Meeting place
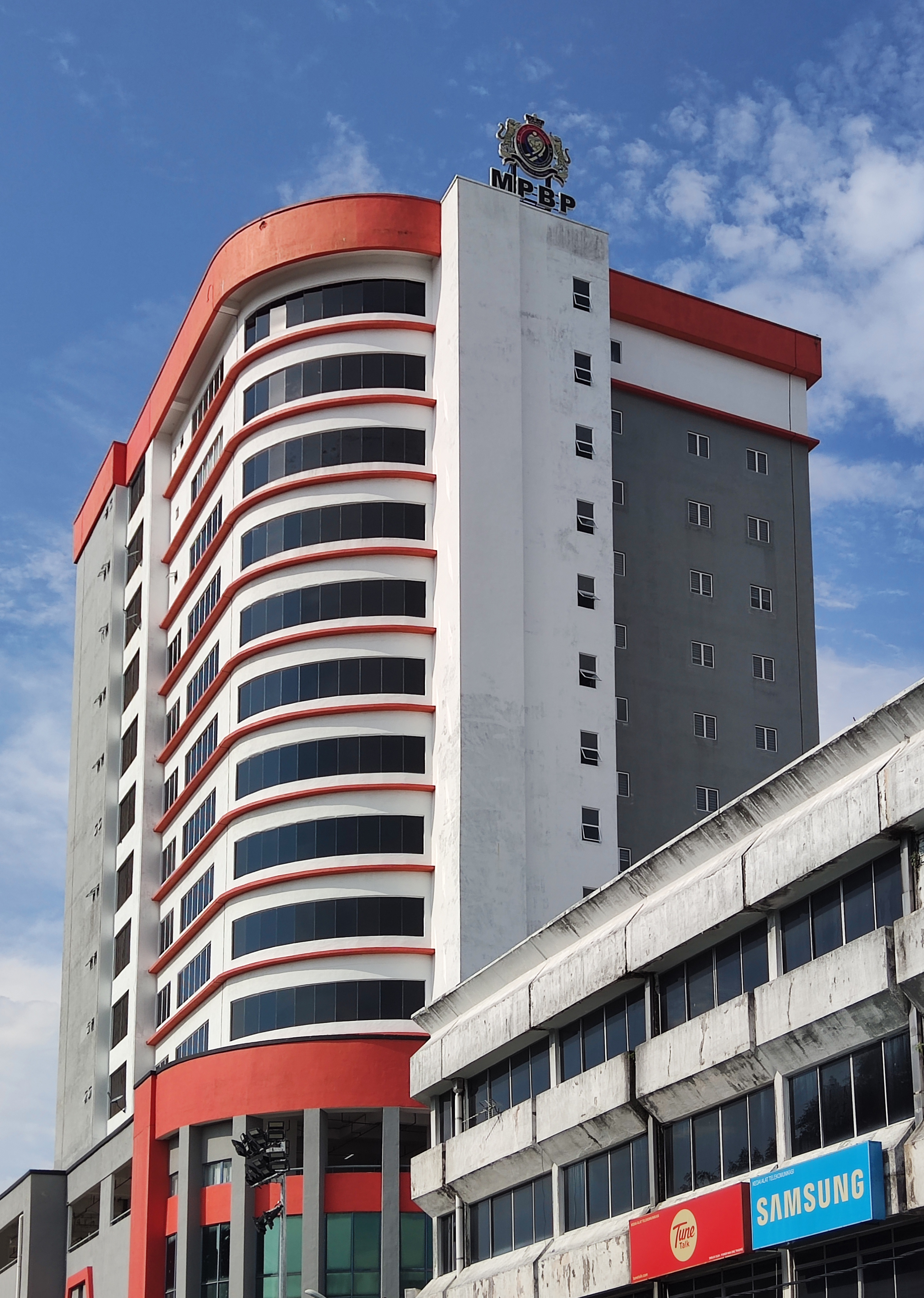
- MPBP Tower, Batu Pahat

Website
- www.mpbp.gov.my

Batu Pahat Municipal Council (MPBP; Malay: Majlis Perbandaran Batu Pahat) is a local authority which administrates West Batu Pahat District in Johor, Malaysia. This agency is under Johor state government. MPBP are responsible for public health and sanitation, waste removal and management, town planning, environmental protection and building control, social and economic development and general maintenance functions of urban infrastructure. The MPBP main headquarters is located at Jalan Rugayah since 22 May 2022, replaced its previous location at Jalan Pejabat, Bandar Penggaram, Batu Pahat.

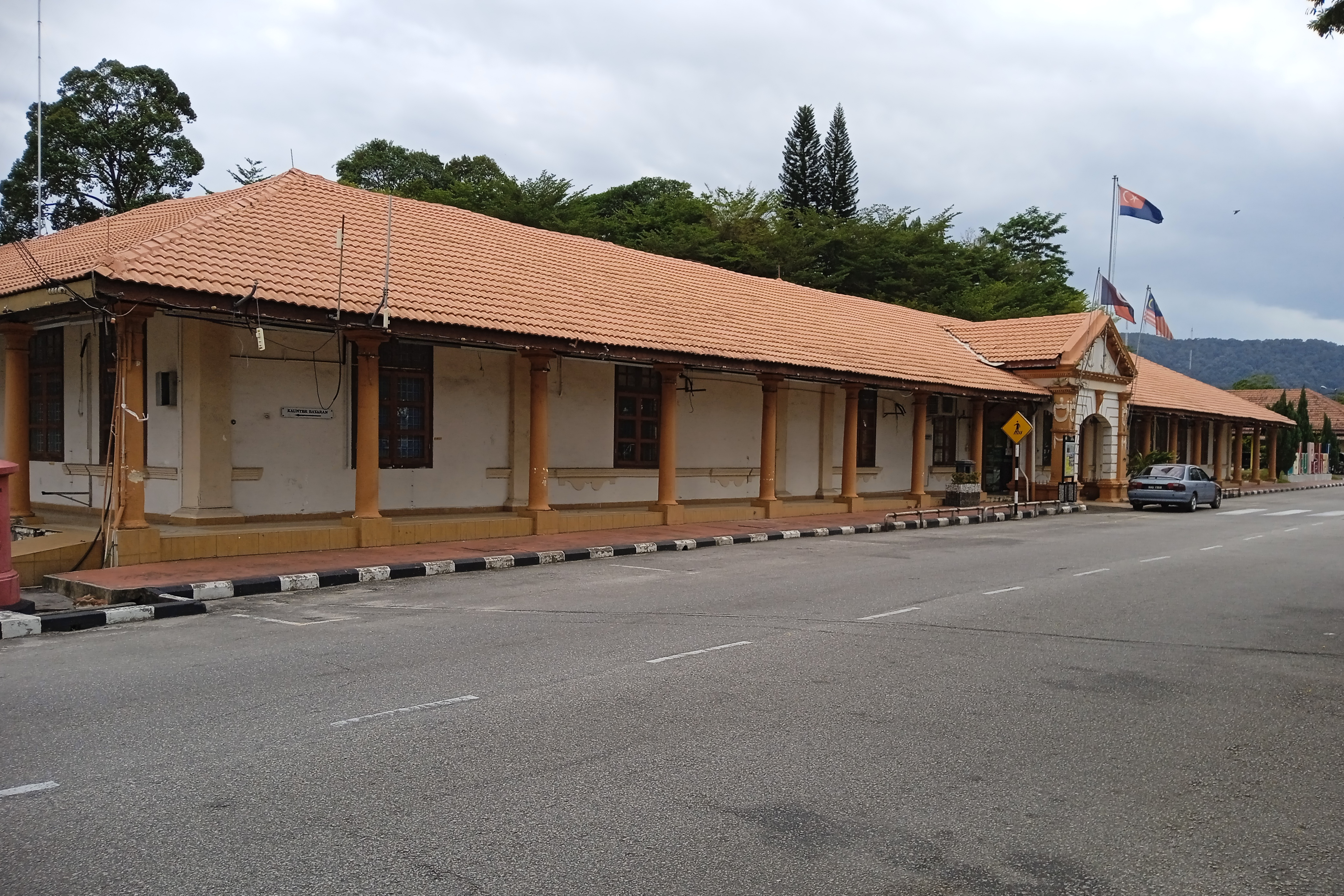
Former headquarters at Jalan Pejabat from 1976 until 2022.

Batu Pahat Municipal Council was formerly known as the Bandar Penggaram Town Board (Malay: Lembaga Bandaran Bandar Penggaram) from 1912 to 1951, the Bandar Penggaram Town Council (Malay: Majlis Bandaran Bandar Penggaram) from 1952 to 1975 and the Batu Pahat West District Council (Malay: Majlis Daerah Batu Pahat Barat, MDBPB) from 1 November 1976 until 31 December 2000. The last was formed by merging the Bandar Penggaram Town Council with six other local councils of Senggarang, Parit Raja, Semerah, Sri Gading, Tongkang Pechah and Rengit.

== Emblem history ==
The original emblem of the Batu Pahat Municipal Council was adopted since its establishment on 1 January 2001. It is a combination of several elements such as the Rub el Hizb to symbolise Islamic Faith, circuit board and waves to symbolise technological progress, as well as three gates and dots to symbolise economical, social and educational progress and citizen harmony and cooperativeness. The Municipal Council's name in Jawi and Romanised Malay script is written at the top of the emblem, while the motto Maju dan Sejahtera (Progress and Prosper) in Romanised Malay is written below.

On 1 January 2018 (its 17th anniversary), the municipal council adopted a new emblem which contains its original emblem inside an oval shield with colours of the Batu Pahat District flag (divided per bend in red and black), supported by two Johor State arms tigers on both sides and topped by the Johor Royal Crown. Its name in Jawi and Romanised Malay has been moved into the outer part of the shield, separated from the original emblem by a white oval, with two sprigs of black peppers between them. The council's motto – Maju dan Sejahtera is now written on a blue scroll under the shield decorated with two yellow leaves.

Emblem of Batu Pahat Municipal Council (2001–2018)

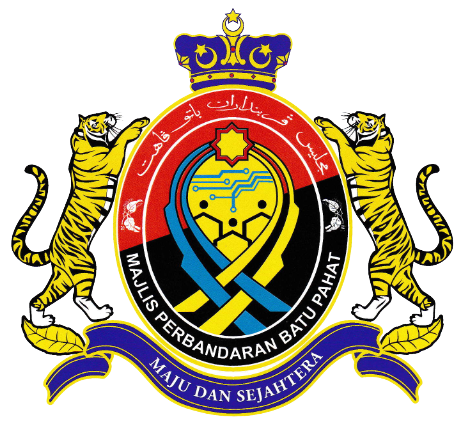
Emblem of Batu Pahat Municipal Council (2018–present)

== Presidents of Batu Pahat ==
#	Name of Presidents	Term start	Term end
1	Zainal Abidin Ahmad	1973	1977
2	Abd Kadir Samion	1977	1979
3	Ishak Yusof	1979	1979
4	Rahmat Asri	1980	1983
5	Hashim Yahya	1983	1986
6	Lokman Thany	1987	1993
7	Rashidi Mohd Noor	1993	1995
8	Sukiman Sahlan	1996	1998
9	Punjian Sutarjo	1999	2000
10	Abd Latiff Yusof	16 January 2000	15 July 2002
11	Md Naim Nasir	16 July 2002	15 March 2003
12	Mohamed Karim	16 March 2003	31 May 2004
13	Md Shafiee Hashim	1 June 2004	March 2006
14	Kamarudin Abdullah	March 2006	15 August 2006
15	Amran A Rahman	16 August 2006	15 March 2009
16	Sallehuddin Hassan	16 March 2009	31 May 2011
17	Abd Rashid Ismail	1 June 2011	30 April 2014
18	Mahadon Marnin	1 May 2014	31 August 2015
19	Ramli Abdul Rahman	1 September 2015	16 January 2017
20	Shafiei Ahamad	17 January 2017	2 February 2019
21	Kamalluddin Jamal	3 February 2019	1 January 2022
22	Ezahar Abu Sairin	2 January 2022	15 October 2025
23	Mohd Nazid Jasiman	16 October 2025	Present

== Departments ==
- Finance (Kewangan)
- Engineering and Landscape (Kejuruteraan Dan Landskap)
- Community Development (Pembangunan Masyarakat)
- Valuation And Property Management (Penilaian Dan Pengurusan Harta)
- Management Services (Khidmat Pengurusan)
- Environmental Health (Kesihatan Persekitaran)
- Development Planning (Perancangan Pembangunan)
- Enforcement (Penguatkuasaan)
- Licensing (Pelesenan)

== Division ==
- Information Technology (Teknologi Maklumat)

== Units ==
- Law (Undang-undang)
- Internal Audit (Audit Dalam)
- Corporate And Public Relations (Korporat Dan Perhubungan Awam)
- One Stop Centre (Pusat Sehenti)
- Income And Contract (Perolehan Dan Kontrak)

== Administration areas (zones) ==
As of 2025, Batu Pahat is divided into 24 zones represented by 24 councillors to act as mediators between residents and the municipal council. The councillors for the 1 April 2024 to 31 December 2025 session are as below:

Zone	Councillor	Political affiliation
Semerah	Amir Hamzah Mamon@Mohamad	UMNO
Sri Sulong	Hamdan Ayub	UMNO
Peserai	Mohd Ismail Roslan	UMNO
Shahbandar	Lim Key Sen	MCA
Semarang	Abdul Halid Saat	UMNO
Parit Raja Utara	Toh Poey Tiong	MCA
Taman Maju	Kevin Chok Ngen Kerk	MCA
Tongkang Pechah	Mohd Lassim Burhan	UMNO
Parit Besar	Haryani Sukarman	UMNO
Jalan Kluang	Murugan Shanmugam	MIC
Pura Kencana	Teo Shang Chuan	MCA
Parit Raja	Norhanim Monadam	UMNO
Parit Bilal	Zaidi Japar	UMNO
Taman Universiti	Khairul Amin Sa'adan	UMNO
Taman Bukit Pasir	Abd Kahar Osman	UMNO
Desa Botani	King Ban Siang	MCA
Kampung Kenangan Dato Onn	Haliza Abdullah	UMNO
Bukit Perdana	Koh Yee Yong	MCA
Taman Soga	Ranjit Singh Gurdial Singh	MIC
Town Centre	Ter Hwa Kwong	MCA
Evergreen Heights	Azmin Nizam Alias@Elias	UMNO
Senggarang	Abdul Rashid Sahari	UMNO
Rengit Utara	Teo Siau Pei	MCA
Rengit Selatan	Arzahar Salleh	UMNO

== See also ==
- Batu Pahat District
- Yong Peng
- Batu Pahat
