= List of highways numbered 6A =

The following highways are numbered 6A:

== United States ==
- U.S. Route 6A (Connecticut) (former)
- U.S. Route 6A (Rhode Island)
- Route 6A (southern New England) (former)
  - Route 6A (northern New England) (former)
- Massachusetts Route 6A
- Nevada State Route 6A (former)
- County Route 6A (Monmouth County, New Jersey)
- New York State Route 6A (former)
  - County Route 6A (Oneida County, New York)
  - County Route 6A (Ulster County, New York)
