= Kahang =

Coordinates: 2°12′50″N 103°32′25″E

- Mukim
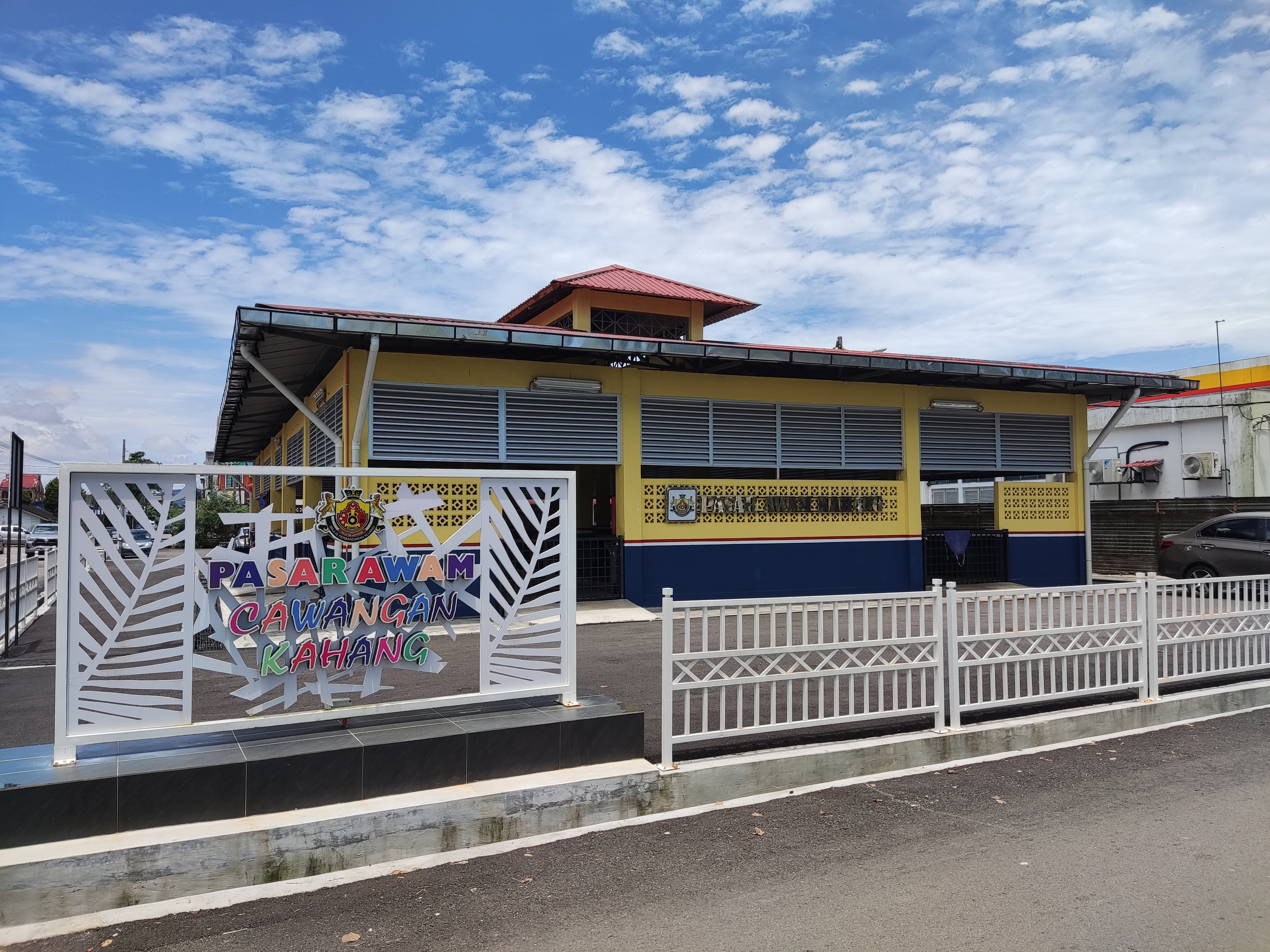
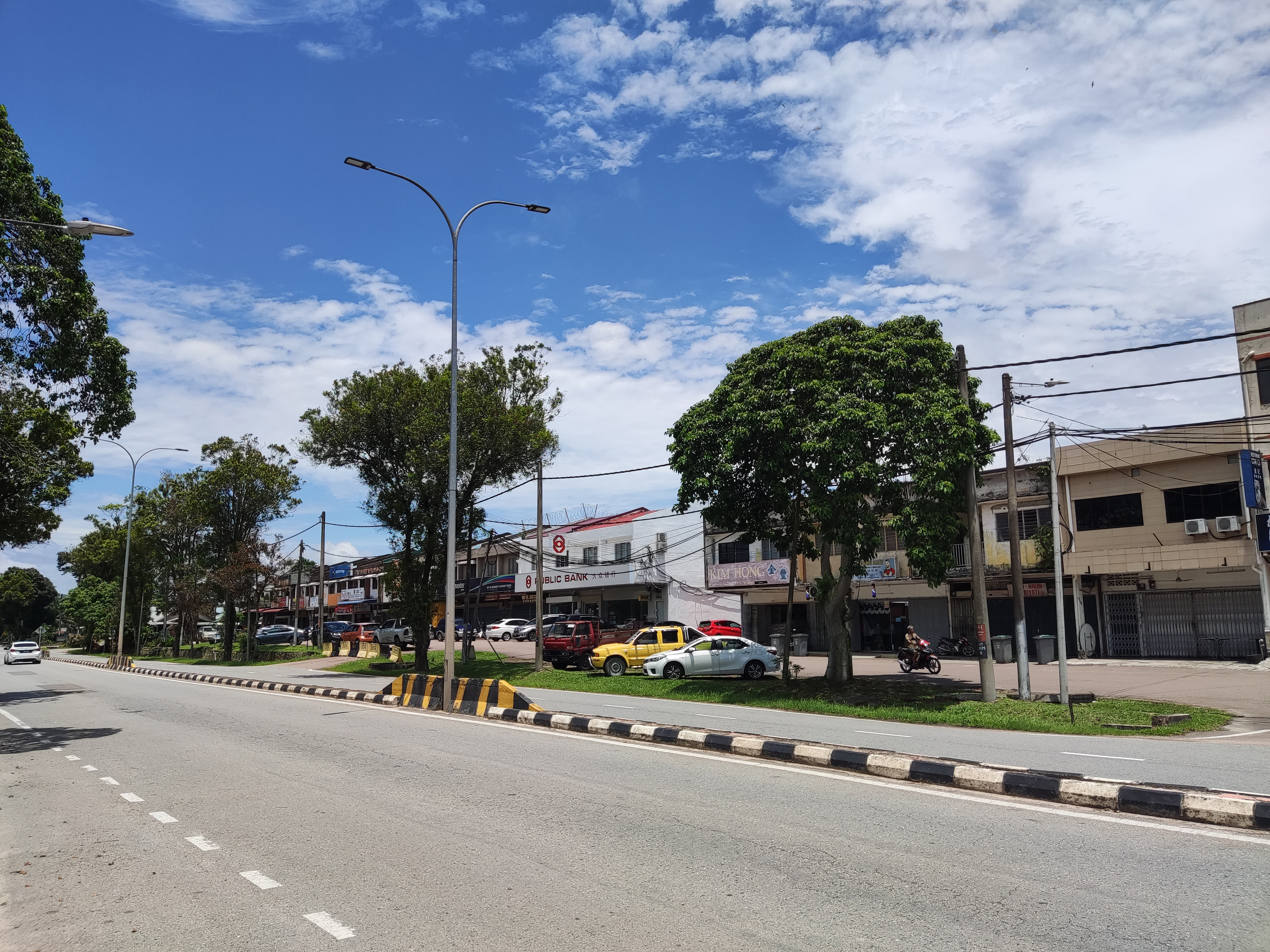
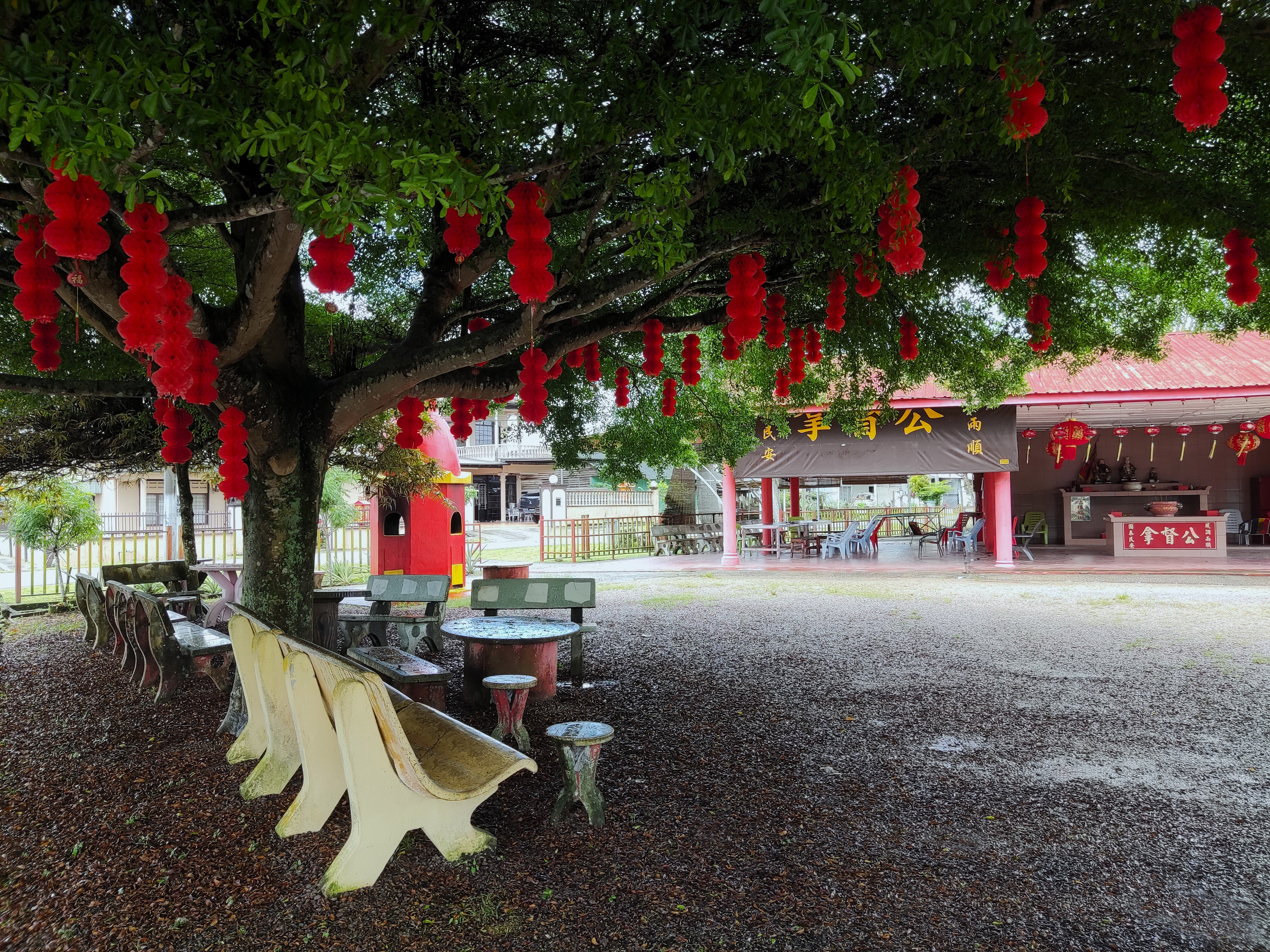
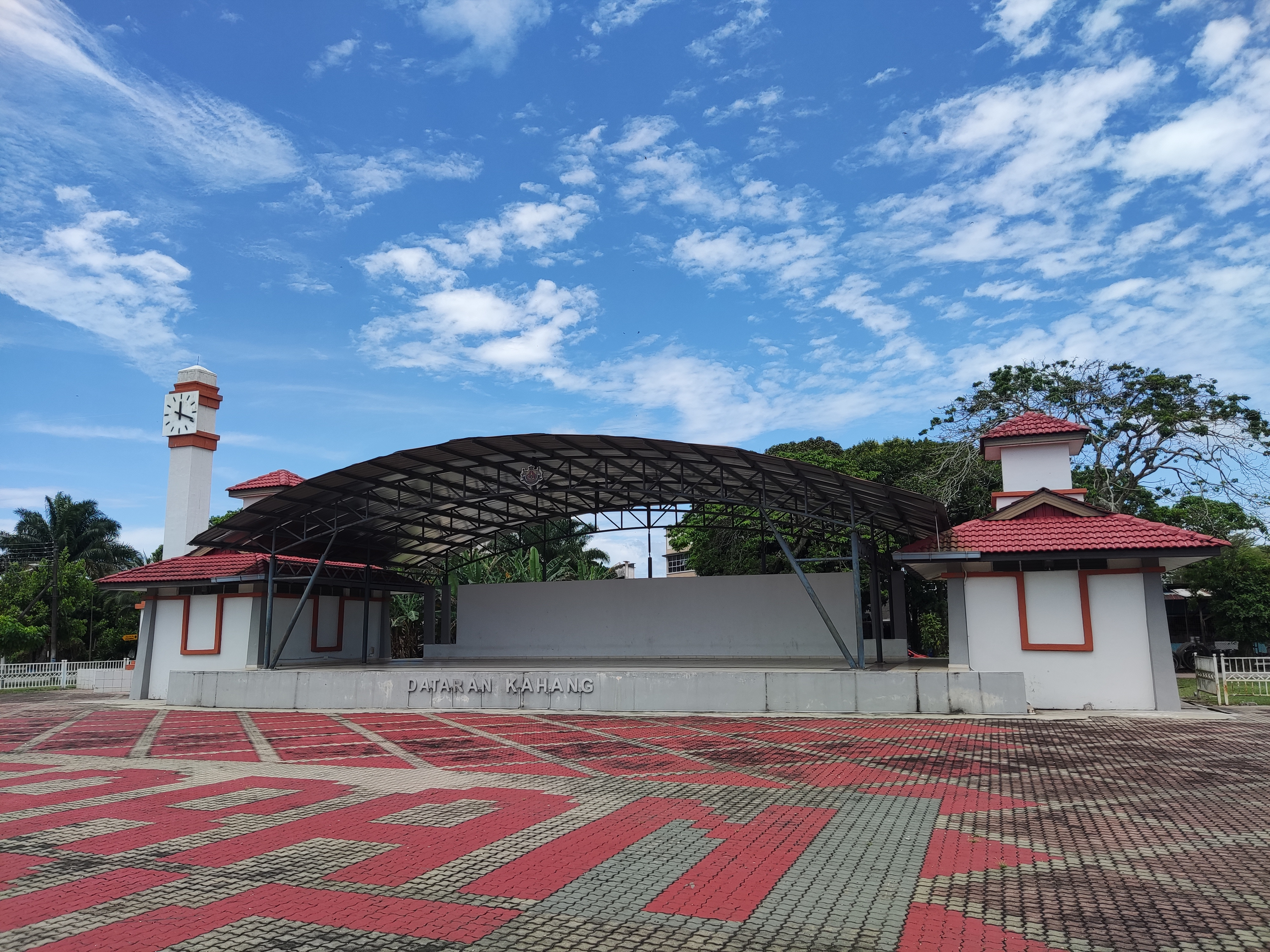
- Public market Jalan Mersing Datuk Gong temple Kahang Square
- Interactive map of Kahang
- Country: Malaysia
- State: Johor
- District: Kluang

Area
  - Total: 548 km^{2} (212 sq mi)

Kahang in Kulang District

Kahang is a mukim in Kluang District, Johor, Malaysia. It is particularly known as the final stop before heading to the Endau Rompin National Park and located along the Malaysia Federal Route 50.

== Geography ==
The mukim spans over an area of 548 km^{2}.

== Economy ==
Kahang has an organic paddy farm 28 miles away from Kluang.

== School in Kahang ==
=== Primary school ===
- Sekolah Kebangsaan Seri Sedohok
- Sekolah Kebangsaan Ladang Mutiara
- Sekolah Kebangsaan Kahang
- Sekolah Jenis Kebangsaan (Tamil) Kahang Batu 24
- Sekolah Jenis Kebangsaan (Cina) Kahang

=== Secondary school ===
- Sekolah Menengah Kebangsaan Kahang
