= Batu Pahat Mall =

Shopping mall in Batu Pahat, Johor, Malaysia

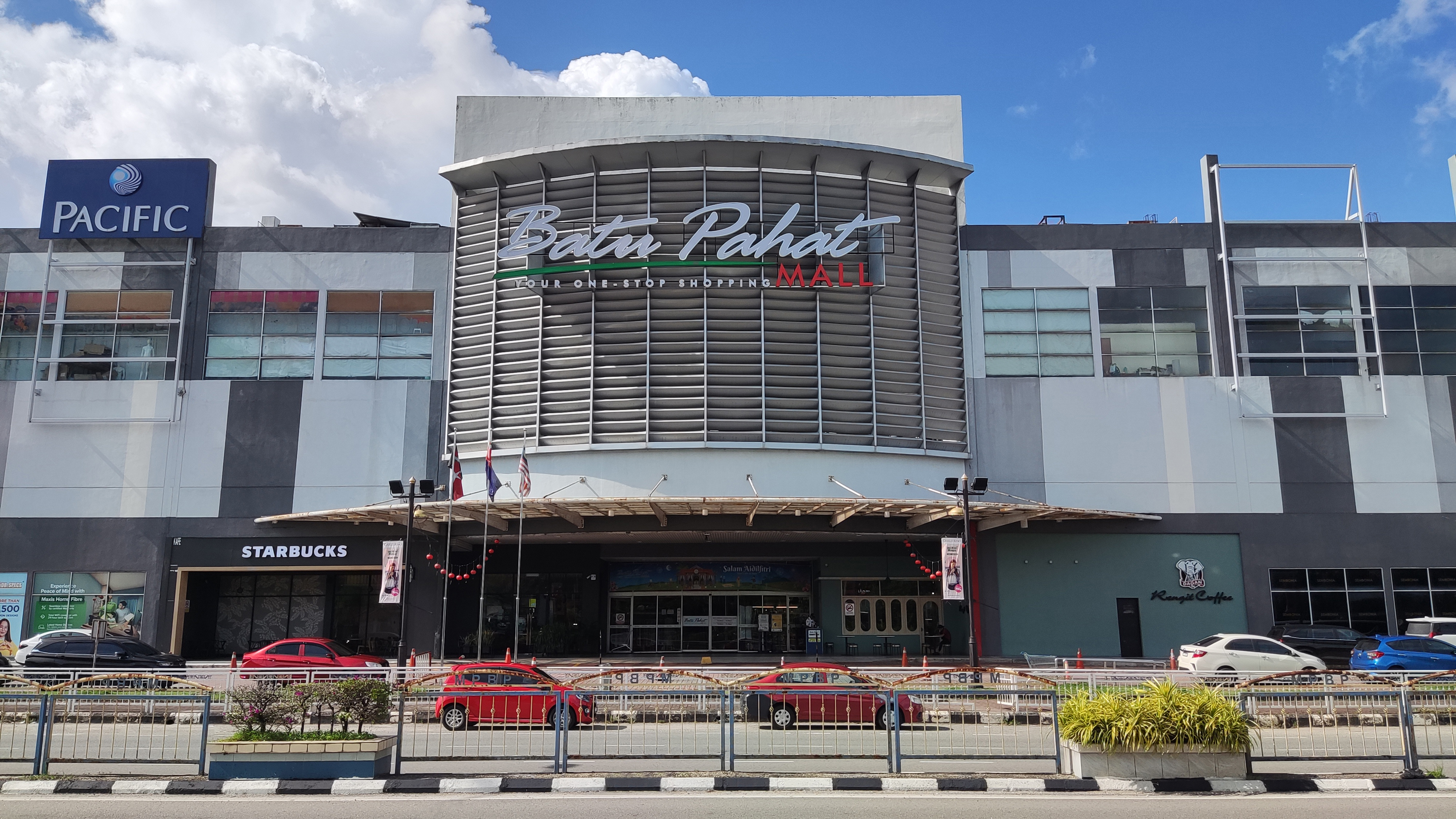
- Location: Batu Pahat, Johor, Malaysia
- Architect: Shopping mall
- Num. of stores: 260

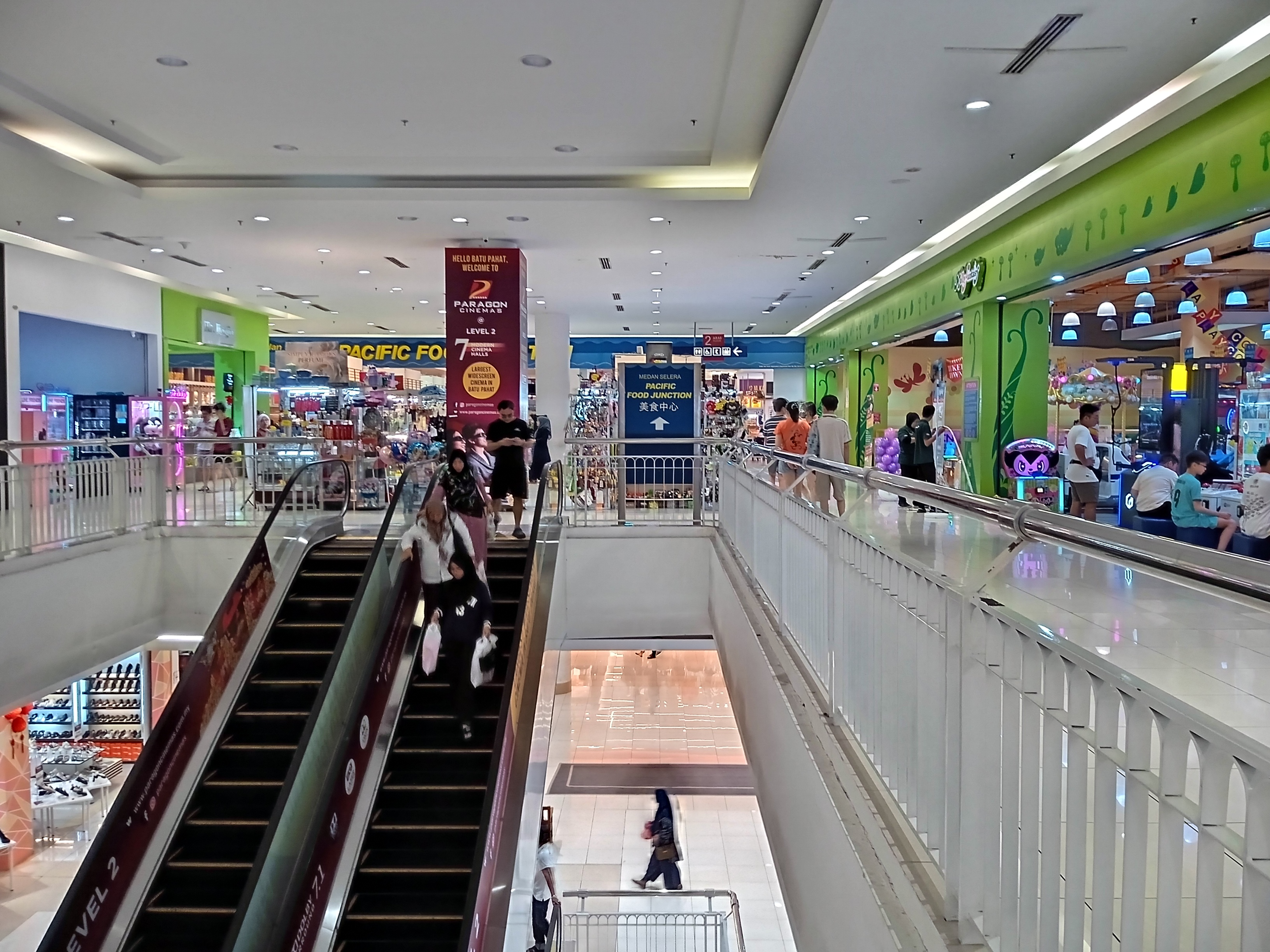
Interior of Batu Pahat Mall

Batu Pahat Mall (BP Mall) is a shopping mall in Batu Pahat Town, Batu Pahat District, Johor, Malaysia. The mall is located at Federal Route 50.

== Business ==
The shopping mall consists of 260 retail outlets, most notably POPULAR Bookstores, a bookshop owned by Popular Holdings. The residents of Batu Pahat also frequently visit Paragon Cinemas, one of the two cinemas in the city, the other being MBO Cinemas in the nearby Square One Shopping Mall. The Capcom Station Arcade is where the younger generations often go to.

== Transportation ==
The shopping mall is accessible by Causeway Link route 8 from Ayer Hitam to Batu Pahat Town.

== See also ==
- Batu Pahat
- Bandar Penggaram, Batu Pahat
