= Johor State Route J6 =

Road in Malaysia

Johor Route 6
- Jalan Layang Layang

Major junctions
- Southwest end: Bukit Batu
- FT 1 Federal Route 1 J25 State Route J25
- Northeast end: Layang Layang

Location
- Country: Malaysia

Highway system
- Highways in Malaysia; Expressways; Federal; State

Johor State Route J6, Jalan Layang Layang is a major road in Johor, Malaysia.

== Junction lists ==
The entire route is located in Kulai District, Johor.

Legend:

- I/C - Interchange, I/S - Intersection, RSA - Rest and service area, OBR - Overhead bridge restaurant, R/R - Restaurant and rest plaza, L/B - Layby, V/P - Vista point, TN - tunnel, T/P - Toll plaza, BR - Bridge
- C - Cloverleaf, S - Stack, T-A - Trumpet-A, T-B - Trumpet-B, DT - Directional-T/Y, SDT - Semi-Directional-T/Y, P-Y - Partial-Y, D - Diamond, P-C - Partial cloverleaf, D-D - Diverging diamond, D-R - Direct ramp

Location	km	mi	Name	Destinations	Notes
Bukit Batu			Bukit Batu	FT 1 Malaysia Federal Route 1 – Ayer Hitam, Batu Pahat, Kluang, Simpang Renggam, Kulai, Kota Tinggi, Johor Bahru; North–South Expressway Southern Route / AH2 – Kuala Lumpur, Johor Bahru	T-junctions
Bukit Batu			Railway crossing bridge		
Layang Layang			Layang Layang	J25 Johor State Route J25 – Renggam, Simpang Renggam, Kluang, FELDA --	T-junctions
1.000 mi = 1.609 km; 1.000 km = 0.621 mi
