= Pura Kencana =

Pura Kencana 旺金城
- Township
- Country: Malaysia
- State: Johor
- District: Batu Pahat

Area
  - Total: 320 ha (790 acres)
- Website: www.gentingproperty.com/property-genting-pura-kencana-batu-pahat-johor-8.aspx

Pura Kencana is a township in Sri Gading, Batu Pahat District, Malaysia. The township is under the jurisdiction of Batu Pahat Municipal Council and is located along Jalan Kluang, which is near to Batu Pahat Mall.

Pura Kencana is a planned settlement developed by Genting Property. Construction began in 2008, and the township has an area of 320 hectares.

== See also ==
- Batu Pahat
