= Parit Raja =

- Township
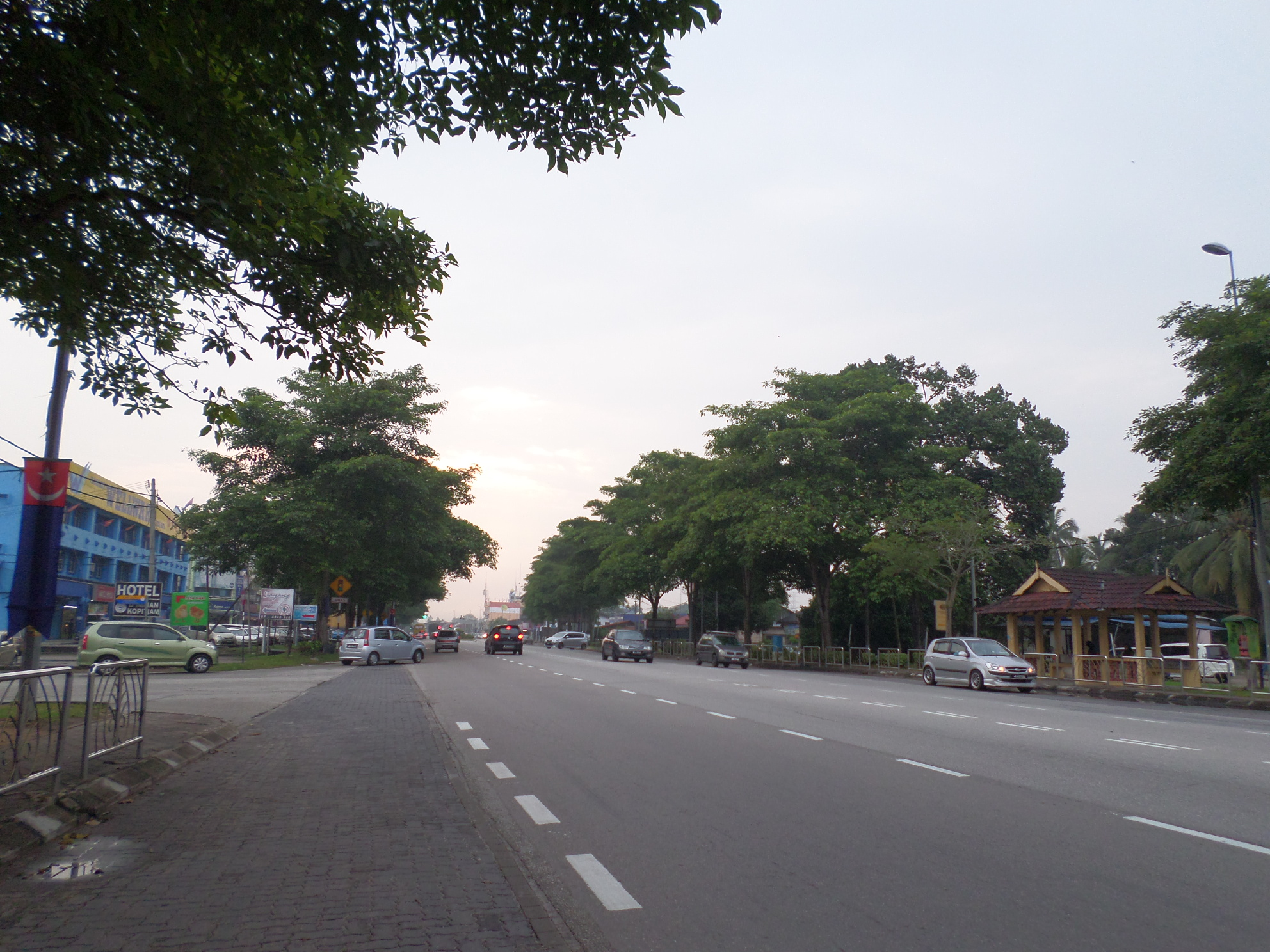

- Flag Seal

- Location in Malaysia Parit Raja (Johor)
- Coordinates: 1°51′45″N 103°06′25″E
- Country: Malaysia
- State: Johor
- City: Batu Pahat

Government
  - Type: Mayor-council government
  - Body: Batu Pahat Municipal Council
  - Local Authority: Ezahar Abu Sairin
- Time zone: UTC+8 (MST)
- Postcode: 86400
- Dialling code: +607
- Police: Batu Pahat
- Fire: Batu Pahat / Ayer Hitam

Parit Raja is a town in Batu Pahat District, Johor, Malaysia. The main population of this town and its surrounding areas has been resided by Malay with Javanese descent, besides the Chinese population.

This locality has a unique diversification spanning from foods and cultures. There is lots of restaurant that serves Indian Muslim (colloquially known as "Mamak"), Chinese, Southern Malay and Northern Malay cuisines. This locality also serves as an important marketplace and commercial centre, few examples are, Pasar Isnin-Khamis, Pasar Rabu, making it a hotspot for local farmers, street food hawkers and commercial businesses.

== Geography ==
Taman Siswa Jaya is a mix residential and commercial just 1 kilometer from UTHM's main entrance and 1.5 km from downtown Parit Raja. It is situated along the trunk road (KM20 Jalan Kluang) in between UTHM and Parit Raja town.

A few examples of neighbourhood that exist in Parit Raja are Kampung Parit Londang, Kampung Parit Bingan, Kampung Parit Haji Ali, Kampung Sungai Rambut and Kampung Seri Dalam

Approximately 23 km away from Bandar Penggaram, Batu Pahat, capital of Batu Pahat district and 7 kilometres away from Ayer Hitam. It is about 10 minutes from the North South Expressway (NSE) Ayer Hitam Exit (KM80) and 20 minutes from Bandar Penggaram. Along the way to Parit Raja, you will pass by many villages and most of them are named after a "Parit", which means "Trench' in English, due to the relatively flat terrain and abundant waterways. The town spans over an area of 19.6 km^{2}.
