= Batu Pahat High School =

Coordinates: 1°50′30.9″N 102°55′58.9″E

- Batu Pahat in the state of Johor; Malaysia

Information
- Type: High school
- Established: 1918

High School Batu Pahat (HSBP) (Malay: Sekolah Menengah Kebangsaan Tinggi Batu Pahat (SMKTBP); abbreviated as Sekolah Tinggi Batu Pahat (STBP) also known as Sekolah Menengah Kebangsaan Tinggi Batu Pahat formally) is a secondary school for boys located in the town of Batu Pahat in the state of Johor, Malaysia. It was known as Government English School previously, but was changed to High School Batu Pahat after the independence of Malaysia.

== History ==
High School was initially at a building in Jalan Zabedah (now the JKR building). Then it was relocated to land in Jalan Zaharah. The new building (now the Administration building) was built in 1918 and opened in 1919.

== Academic program ==
The school offers basic and advanced secondary education courses. Like other secondary schools, it offers lower and upper secondary educations: Form 1, 2, 3, 4 and 5.

The pre-university classes consists of Lower Six and Upper Six classes. Most students studying in Form Six classes wear different uniform colours than the secondary students. The most important exam that the Form Six students take is the Sijil Tinggi Pelajaran Malaysia (STPM) certificate.

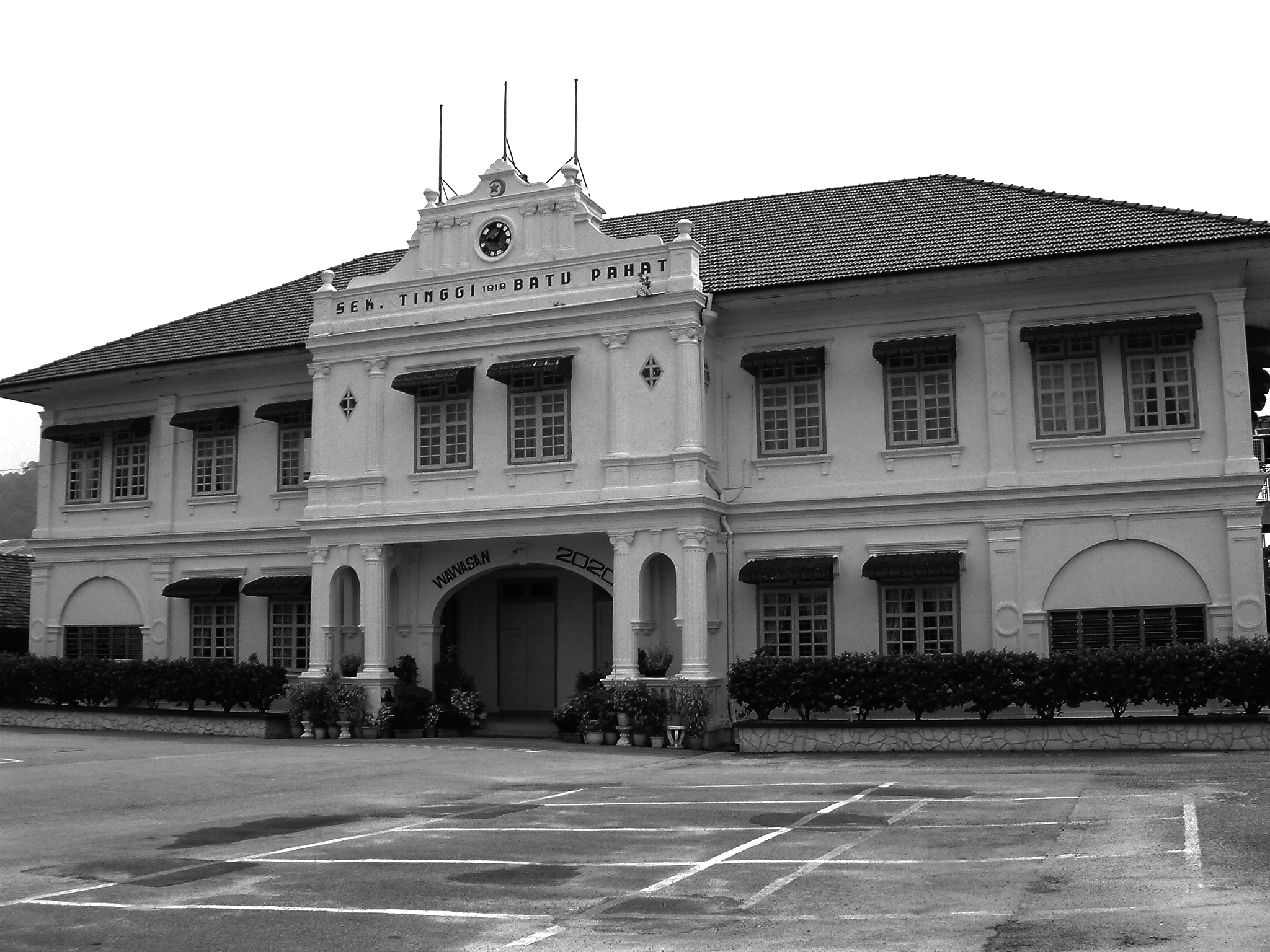
Administration building

== Notable alumni ==
The High School Batu Pahat Alumni was registered in 1956. The alumni has made contributions to the school, among them the present library building with its air-conditioning systems, the basketball court and the school pavilion.

- Tan Sri Dr. Chua Soi Lek - former Health Minister
- Aznah Hamid - Actor
- Lim Guan Eng - former Finance Minister
- Tan Sri Vincent Tan Chee Yioun - founder of Berjaya Corporation
- Allahyarham Tun Syed Nasir Ismail - former DBP Director and 5th Speaker of Dewan Rakyat
- Abdul Kadir bin Talib - former chairman of election commission
- Dato Seri Justice Ibrahim bin Abdul Manan
- Dato Seri Ali bin Hamsa - Former Chief Secretary to Government of Malaysia
- Tan Sri Prof. Gauth Jasmon, -Vice-Chancellor of University of Malaya, and former Vice-Chancellor of Multimedia University
- Syed Husin Ali - Former Senator, former President of Parti Sosialis Rakyat Malaysia and Deputy President of People's Justice Party
- Dr Kua Kia Soong - former DAP MP and social activist
- Dr. Hee Tien Lai - former Deputy Speaker of Dewan Rakyat
- Tan Sri Lim Kit Siang - DAP veteran
- Datuk Syed Esa Alwee - former Speaker of Dewan Rakyat
- Dato' Lokman Noor Adam - politician
- Professor Datuk Dr A Rahman A Jamal - Pro Vice Chancellor UKM
