= Ayer Hitam =

- Town

Other transcription(s)
  - Jawi: ايير هيتم
  - Chinese: 亚依淡
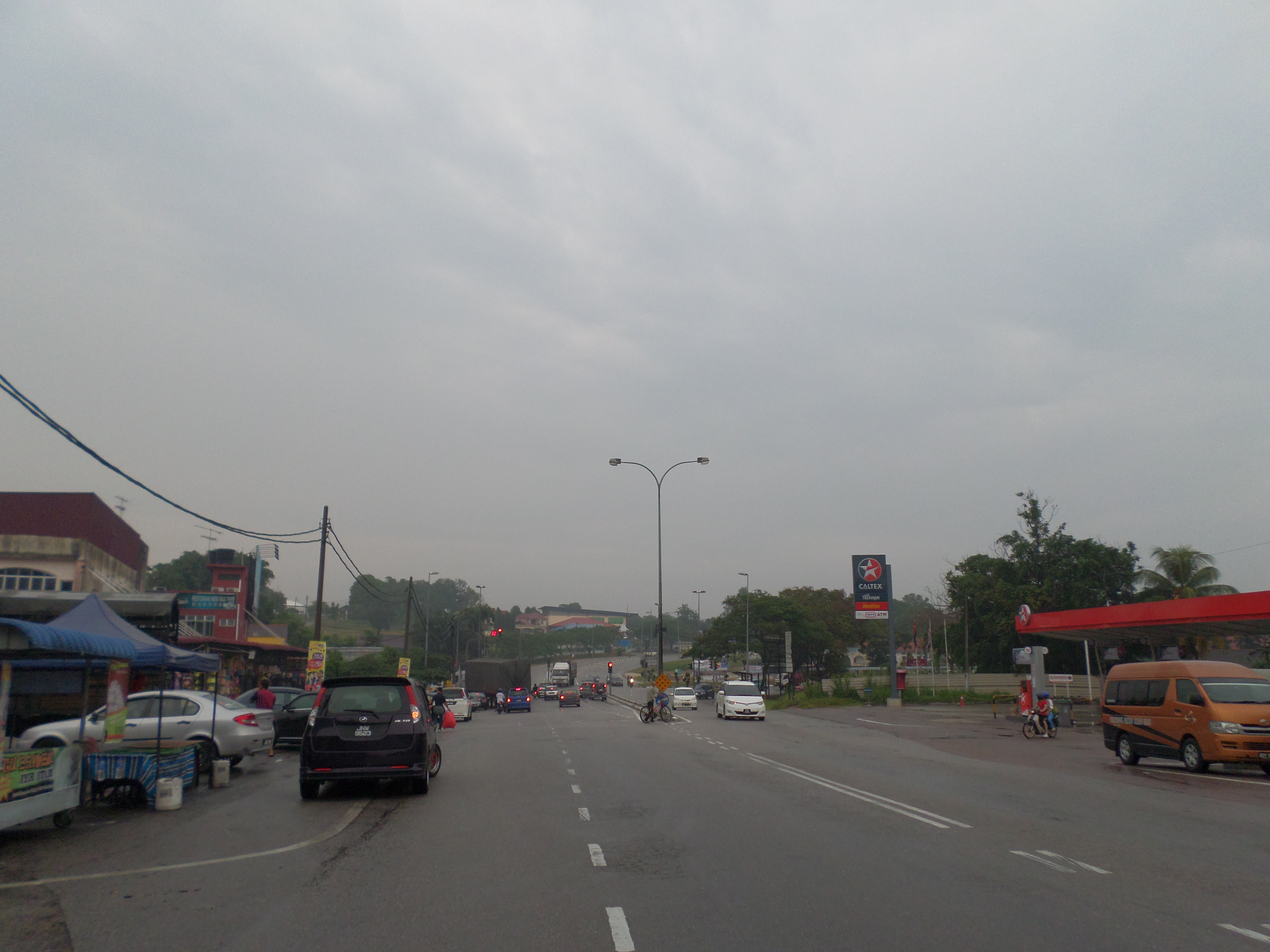
- Intersection between Federal Routes 1 and 50 near Ayer Hitam.

- Ayer Hitam in Batu Pahat, Johor.
- Coordinates: 1°55′6″N 103°10′49″E
- Country: Malaysia
- State: Johor
- District: Batu Pahat

Ayer Hitam, nicknamed Bandar Seramik ('Ceramic Town'), is a town in Batu Pahat District, Johor, Malaysia. Located just at the junction of Federal Route 1 and Federal Route 50, it is known for its many outlets selling pottery and other crafts. It also is one of the interchange for North–South Expressway.

== History ==
Ayer Hitam in Batu Pahat District

Ayer Hitam meaning "Black Water" is a town in Johor, Malaysia, known for its ceramic products and local food products. The town is situated along a major north–south travel route and serves as a stop for motorists travelling between northern and southern parts of the country.

Ayer Hitam is known for its pottery and ceramic products, including flower vases, photo frames, jars, ashtrays and other decorative household items. Some pottery workshops allow visitors to observe the production process.

The town also has numerous stalls selling local snacks, commonly referred to as kerepek. Products sold include prawn crackers, steamed corn, tapioca chips and otak-otak, a traditional fish-based food commonly associated with Malaysian cuisine. These products are available in freshly prepared and prepackaged forms.

Located in the district of Batu Pahat. Before the advent of the North–South Expressway, Ayer Hitam was a major route intersection leading to Melaka and Kuala Lumpur going northbound, Johor Bahru going southbound, Kluang and Mersing going eastbound, and Batu Pahat going westbound. It was a popular rest stop for many tour buses and travellers between Singapore and Kuala Lumpur. Visitors could find souvenir shops, restaurants and locals peddling to sell their vegetables.

== Place of interest ==
- Masjid Sultan Ibrahim, Ayer Hitam
- Klinik Kesihatan Ayer Hitam
- Pusat Pertanian Ayer Hitam
- UK Farm, Jalan Batu Pahat-Kluang
- Pu Zhao Buddhist Vihara

== Education ==
=== Primary school ===
- Sekolah Kebangsaan Seri Bandan
- Sekolah Kebangsaan Kota Dalam
- Sekolah Kebangsaan Air Hitam
- Sekolah Jenis Kebangsaan (Cina) Malayan

== Transportation ==
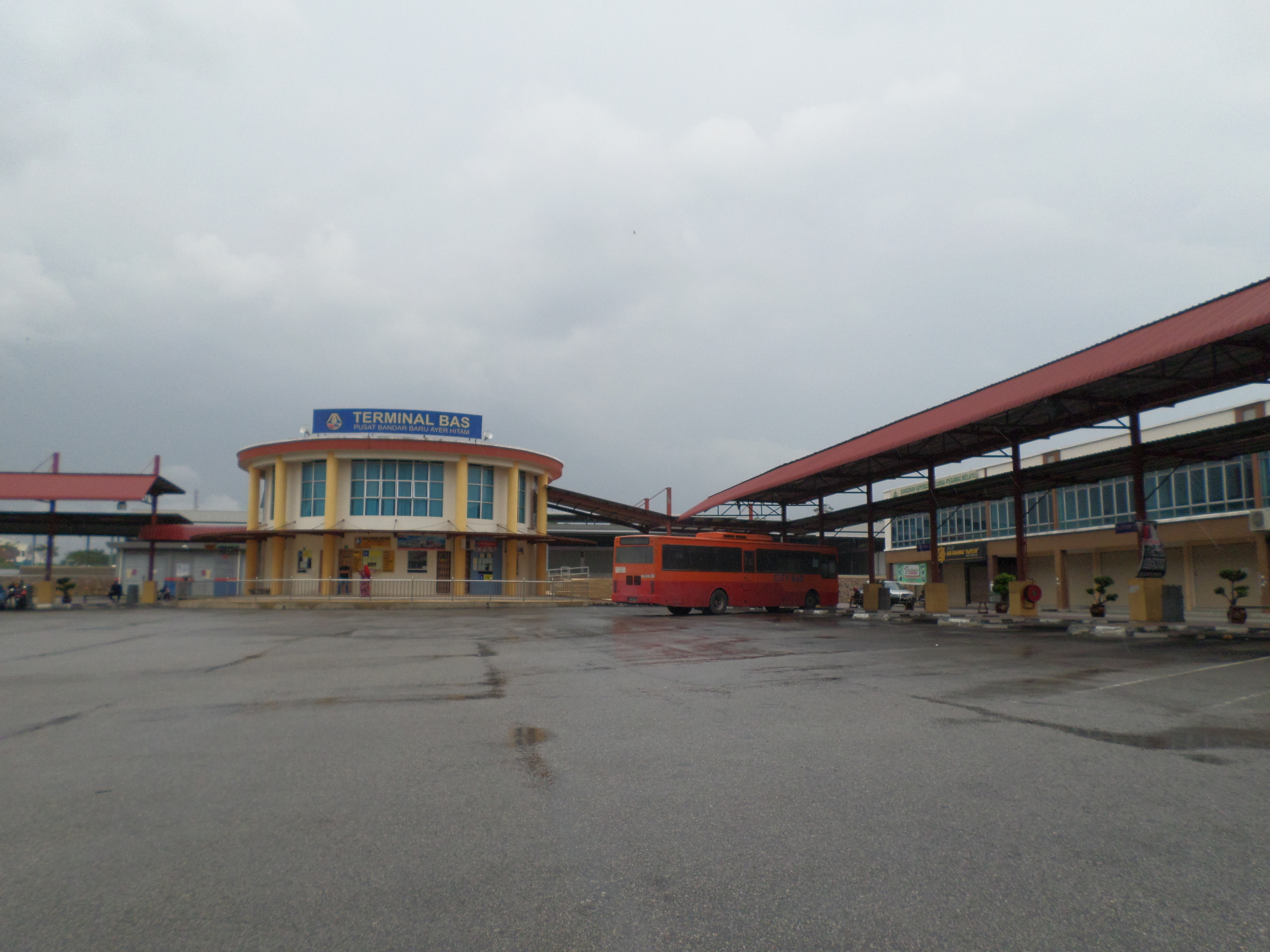
Ayer Hitam bus terminal

=== Road ===
Map of the Ayer Hitam Interchange from OpenStreetMap.

Ayer Hitam has a PLUS Interchange located at the northern part of the town. The town is served by public buses from Kulai, Batu Pahat and Kluang.
