= Johor State Route J150 =

Road in Malaysia

Johor Route 150
- Jalan Bekok

Major junctions
- Southwest end: Chaah
- FT 1 Federal Route 1 J16 State Route J16
- Southeast end: Paloh

Location
- Country: Malaysia
- Primary destinations: Bekok, Jagoh

Highway system
- Highways in Malaysia; Expressways; Federal; State

Jalan Bekok, Johor State Route J150 is a major road in Johor, Malaysia. It connects Chaah in Segamat District to Paloh in Kluang District.

== History ==
=== Upgrade of Bekok–Paloh Section ===
The government announced to build the new dual-directions Bekok–Paloh road, under the 12th Malaysia Plan, expected completed in 2026, spent amount RM 140 million.

Until August 2023, the progress of Bekok–Paloh road construction is 6.64%.

The new Bekok–Paloh road would reduce the travel distances from 70 km to 13 km, and travel times from 1 hour to 13–15 minutes.

On 13 June 2025, the acquisition of land for construction is completed.

== Junction lists ==
The entire route is located in Johor.

Legend:

- I/C - Interchange, I/S - Intersection, RSA - Rest and service area, OBR - Overhead bridge restaurant, R/R - Restaurant and rest plaza, L/B - Layby, V/P - Vista point, TN - tunnel, T/P - Toll plaza, BR - Bridge
- C - Cloverleaf, S - Stack, T-A - Trumpet-A, T-B - Trumpet-B, DT - Directional-T/Y, SDT - Semi-Directional-T/Y, P-Y - Partial-Y, D - Diamond, P-C - Partial cloverleaf, D-D - Diverging diamond, D-R - Direct ramp

District	Location	km	mi	Name	Destinations	Notes
Segamat	Chaah			Chaah	FT 1 Malaysia Federal Route 1 – Segamat, Labis, Gemas, Kuantan, Pagoh, Muar, Chaah, Yong Peng, Parit Sulong, Batu Pahat, Ayer Hitam, Johor Bahru; North–South Expressway Southern Route / AH2 – Kuala Lumpur, Malacca, Johor Bahru, Singapore	T-junctions
Segamat	Chaah			Sungai Chaah Bridge		
Segamat	Bekok			Bekok	Jalan Pejabat Pos – P&R Bekok railway station KTM ETS	T-junctions
Segamat	Bekok			Railway crossing bridge		
Segamat	Bekok			Bekok		
Segamat	Jagoh			Jagoh		
Kluang	Paloh			Paloh	J16 Johor State Route J16 – Yong Peng, Batu Pahat, Kluang, Mersing; North–South Expressway Southern Route / AH2 – Kuala Lumpur, Malacca, Johor Bahru, Singapore	T-junctions
1.000 mi = 1.609 km; 1.000 km = 0.621 mi: Unopened
