= Johor State Route J160 =

Road in Johor, Malaysia

Johor Route 160
- Jalan Sawah Baru

Route information
- Length: 10.0 km (6.2 mi) Included the 5.77 km (3.59 mi) new section
- History: New section completed on 13 February 2026

Major junctions
- West end: Tenang Stesen
- FT 1 Federal Route 1 J151 State Route J151
- East end: Air Panas; Kampung Tenang

Location
- Country: Malaysia
- Primary destinations: Kampung Sawah Baru

Highway system
- Highways in Malaysia; Expressways; Federal; State

Johor State Route J160, Jalan Sawah Baru, is a major road in Johor state, Malaysia.

== History ==
The State Route J160 originally only consists of the stretch from Air Panas to Kampung Sawah Baru. The 5.77 km (3.59 mi) stretch from Kampung Sawah Baru formerly was the single-way soil road, and narrow.

=== Upgrade of Tenang Stesen–Kampung Sawah Baru section ===
The road upgrade construction was proposed by former Member Parliament of Labis, Chua Tee Yong.

The construction of Tenang Stesen–Kampung Sawah Baru section costs about RM 39 millions and started in March 2022.

The road reduce the distance time from Kampung Sawah Baru and Air Panas to Tenang Stesen around 10 to 20 minutes, without passing through Labis.

The Defect Liability Period (DLP) of the new road started from 13 February 2026 to 12 February 2027.

== Features ==
The State Route J160 come with the features as below.

- Two-lane single carriageway
- 70% of the sections come with street light

== Junction lists ==
The entire route is located in Segamat District, Johor.

Location	km	Name	Destinations	Notes
Tenang Stesen		Tenang Stesen	FT 1 Malaysia Federal Route 1 – Segamat, Genuang, Kuantan, Labis, Chaah, Yong Peng	T-junctions
Kampung Sawah Baru		Kampung Sawah Baru	Unnamed Road – FELDA Redong	T-junctions
Air Panas		Sungai Juaseh bridge		
Air Panas		Jalan Air Panas	J151 Johor State Route J151 – Air Panas, Kampung Tenang, Kampung Juaseh, Labis	T-junctions
1.000 mi = 1.609 km; 1.000 km = 0.621 mi
