= Malaysia Federal Route 1417 =

Federal Route 1417
- Jalan FELDA Maokil

Route information
- Maintained by Malaysian Public Works Department
- Length: 31.30 km (19.45 mi): Entrance: 7.30 km (4.54 mi); Village: 24.00 km (14.91 mi)
- Existed: --–present

Major junctions
- Northeast end: Chaah
- J230 State Route J230 FT 1 / AH142 Federal Route 1
- Southwest end: FELDA Maokil

Location
- Country: Malaysia
- Primary destinations: Muar, Pagoh, Lenga, Bukit Kepong, Segamat, Labis, Chaah

Highway system
- Highways in Malaysia; Expressways; Federal; State

Federal Route 1417, Jalan FELDA Maokil is a FELDA federal road in Johor, Malaysia.

== Route background ==
The Kilometre Zero of the Federal Route 1417 started at Chaah.

== Features ==
- Alternative roads from Bukit Kepong to Chaah and Yong Peng

=== Alternative routes ===
- J32 Johor State Route J32

At most sections, the Federal Route 1417 was built under the JKR R3 road standard, allowing maximum speed limit of up to 70 km/h (43 mph).

There are no overlaps or sections with motorcycle lanes.

== Junction lists ==
The entire route is located in Johor.

District	Location	km	mi	Name	Destinations	Notes
Muar	FELDA Maokil	7.30	4.54	FELDA Maokil	J230 Johor State Route J230 – Muar, Pagoh, Bukit Kepong, Segamat, Labis; North–South Expressway Southern Route / AH2 – Kuala Lumpur, Seremban, Malacca; Jalan Kilang Kelapa Sawit Maokil – Maokil Palm Oil Factory	Roundabout
Segamat	Chaah			Chaah River bridge		
Segamat	Chaah			TNB Chaah intake		
Segamat	Chaah	0.00	0.00	Chaah	FT 1 / AH142 Malaysia Federal Route 1 – Gemas, Segamat, Labis, Kuantan, Bekok, Chaah, Yong Peng, Ayer Hitam; North–South Expressway Southern Route / AH2 – Ayer Hitam, Johor Bahru, Singapore	T-junctions
1.000 mi = 1.609 km; 1.000 km = 0.621 mi
