= Johor State Route J151 =

Road in Malaysia

Johor Route 151
- Jalan Ayer Panas

Major junctions
- West end: Labis
- FT 1 Federal Route 1 J160 State Route J160
- East end: Air Panas

Location
- Country: Malaysia
- Primary destinations: Kampung Sawah Baru

Highway system
- Highways in Malaysia; Expressways; Federal; State

Jalan Ayer Panas, Johor State Route J151 is a major road in Johor state, Malaysia.

== Junction lists ==
The entire route is located in Segamat District, Johor.

Legend:

- I/C - Interchange, I/S - Intersection, RSA - Rest and service area, OBR - Overhead bridge restaurant, R/R - Restaurant and rest plaza, L/B - Layby, V/P - Vista point, TN - tunnel, T/P - Toll plaza, BR - Bridge
- C - Cloverleaf, S - Stack, T-A - Trumpet-A, T-B - Trumpet-B, DT - Directional-T/Y, SDT - Semi-Directional-T/Y, P-Y - Partial-Y, D - Diamond, P-C - Partial cloverleaf, D-D - Diverging diamond, D-R - Direct ramp

Location	km	Name	Destinations	Notes
Labis		Labis	FT 1 Malaysia Federal Route 1 – Segamat, Gemas, Genuang, Kuantan, Pagoh, Muar, Chaah, Yong Peng, Ayer Hitam; North–South Expressway Southern Route / AH2 – Kuala Lumpur, Johor Bahru	T-junctions
Labis		Estate		
Labis		FELDA Tenang	Jalan FELDA Tenang – FELDA Tenang	T-junctions
Labis		Sungai Juasseh bridge		
Air Panas		Air Panas	J160 Johor State Route J160 – Kampung Leboh, Kampung Sawah Baharu, Tenang Station	T-junctions
Air Panas		Air Panas; Kampung Tenang		
Air Panas		Air Panas; Kampung Redong		
1.000 mi = 1.609 km; 1.000 km = 0.621 mi
