= Johor State Route J16 =

Road in Malaysia

Johor Route 16

Major junctions
- Southwest end: Yong Peng
- FT 1 Federal Route 1 J150 State Route J150; J14 State Route J14; FT 50 Federal Route 50; FT 184 Jalan Padang Tembak, Kluang
- Southeast end: Kluang

Location
- Country: Malaysia
- Primary destinations: Paloh. Jagoh, Bekok

Highway system
- Highways in Malaysia; Expressways; Federal; State

Jalan Paloh (Johor State Route J16) is a major road in Johor, Malaysia. It connects Yong Peng until Kluang.

== Features ==
- The ruggedness and high amount of bends and corners along the Yong Peng–Kangkar Baharu–Paloh sections has made the road popular for drag racing enthusiasts.

== Junction lists ==
The entire route is located in Johor.

| District | Location | km | mi | Name | Destinations | Notes |
|---|---|---|---|---|---|---|
| Batu Pahat | Yong Peng | | | Jalan Yong Peng | FT 1 Malaysia Federal Route 1 – Segamat, Labis, Chaah, Yong Peng, Parit Sulong, Batu Pahat, Muar, Ayer Hitam, Simpang Renggam; North–South Expressway Southern Route / AH2 – Kuala Lumpur, Malacca, Johor Bahru, Singapore | T-junctions |
| Batu Pahat | Kangkar Baharu | | | Kangkar Baharu | | |
| Kluang | Paloh | | | Jalan Bekok | J150 Jalan Bekok – Bekok, Jagoh | T-junctions |
| Kluang | Paloh | | | Railway crossing bridge | | |
| Kluang | Paloh | | | Paloh | Paloh railway stations | |
| Kluang | Chamek | | | Kampung Baharu Chamek | | |
| Kluang | Kampung Baharu | | | Jalan Sembrong Dalam | J14 Jalan Kampung Sembrong Dalam – Kampung Sembrong; J249 Jalan Kampung Baru Sri Tengah | Village junctions |
| Kluang | Kluang | | | Kampung Serong | FT 50 Malaysia Federal Route 50 – Kluang town centre, Ayer Hitam, Batu Pahat, Kahang, Jemaluang, Mersing; North–South Expressway Southern Route / AH2 – Kuala Lumpur, Malacca, Johor Bahru, Singapore; FT 184 Malaysia Federal Route 184 – Gunung Lambak, Bandar Tenggara, Kota Tinggi | Junctions |
1.000 mi = 1.609 km; 1.000 km = 0.621 mi
