= 2011 Tenang by-election =

State by-election in Johor, Malaysia

- 30 January 2011

N05 Tenang seat in the Johor State Legislative Assembly
	BN	PAS
Candidate	Mohd Azahar Ibrahim	Normala Sudirman
Party	UMNO	PAS
Alliance	BN	PAS
Popular vote	6,699	2,992
Percentage	69.13%	30.87%
MLA before election
Sulaiman Taha
BN (UMNO)
Elected MLA
Mohd Azahar Ibrahim
BN (UMNO)

The Tenang state by-election was a state by-election that was held on 30 January 2011 in the state of Johor, Malaysia. The nomination of candidates was done on 22 January 2011. The Tenang parliamentary seat fell vacant when its state assemblyman Datuk Sulaiman Taha of United Malays National Organisation died due to a blood infection and other complications due to diabetes. Previously Sulaiman won the Tenang seat with a 2,492-vote majority, beating PAS' Mohd Saim Siran at the 2008 Malaysian general elections. The state assembly seat has some 14,511 voters consisting of 48.9% Malays, 38.3% Chinese, 12% Indians and 0.9% other races. PAS has picked as its candidate Normala Sudirman, a school teacher, while Barisan Nasional has picked Mohd Azahar.

== Results ==
Johor state by-election, 30 January 2011: Tenang The by-election was called due to the death of incumbent, Sulaiman Taha.
Party	Candidate	Votes	%	∆%
BN	Mohd Azahar Ibrahim	6,699	69.13	
PAS	Normala Sudirman	2,992	30.87	
Total valid votes		9,691	100.00	
Total rejected ballots		142		
Unreturned ballots		1		
Turnout		9,834	66.66	
Registered electors		14,753		
Majority		3,707		
BN hold		Swing		
Source(s) "Pilihan Raya Kecil N.05 Tenang". Election Commission of Malaysia.
