= Sulaiman Taha =

Malaysian politician

- سليمان طه

Member of the Johor State Legislative Assembly for Tenang, Labis
- In office March 2004 – December 2010
- Preceded by: Ibrahim Daud (UMNO-BN)
- Succeeded by: Vacant

Personal details
- Born: 16 November 1951
- Died: 17 December 2010 (aged 59) Kuala Lumpur, Malaysia
- Party: UMNO–BN
- Occupation: Politician

Datuk Sulaiman Taha (died 17 December 2010, aged 59) was a Malaysian politician. He was a member of the Johor State Legislative Assembly from 2004 until his death in 2010. He was a member of the United Malay National Organisation in the Barisan Nasional coalition, and held the seat for Tenang. He served as assistant secretary of Umno Youth from 1987 to 1993 and as executive secretary of the Johor Umno liaison committee from 1994 to 1997.

== Election results ==
Johor State Legislative Assembly: Tenang, Labis >
Year	Government	Votes	Pct	Opposition	Votes	Pct
2004	Sulaiman Taha (UMNO)	7,655	75%	Md Saim Siran (PAS)	2,138	21%
2008	Sulaiman Taha (UMNO)	6,367	60%	Md Saim Siran (PAS)	3,875	36%

== Family ==
Sulaiman Taha was married to Seri Noraini Yaakop and had seven children: son Aiman Azri Taha and daughters Marsila, Marliza, Marina, Miza Liyana Taha, Miza Qamarina and Miza Husna.
