= Eco-Shop =

Malaysian variety store chain

Eco-Shop Marketing Berhad
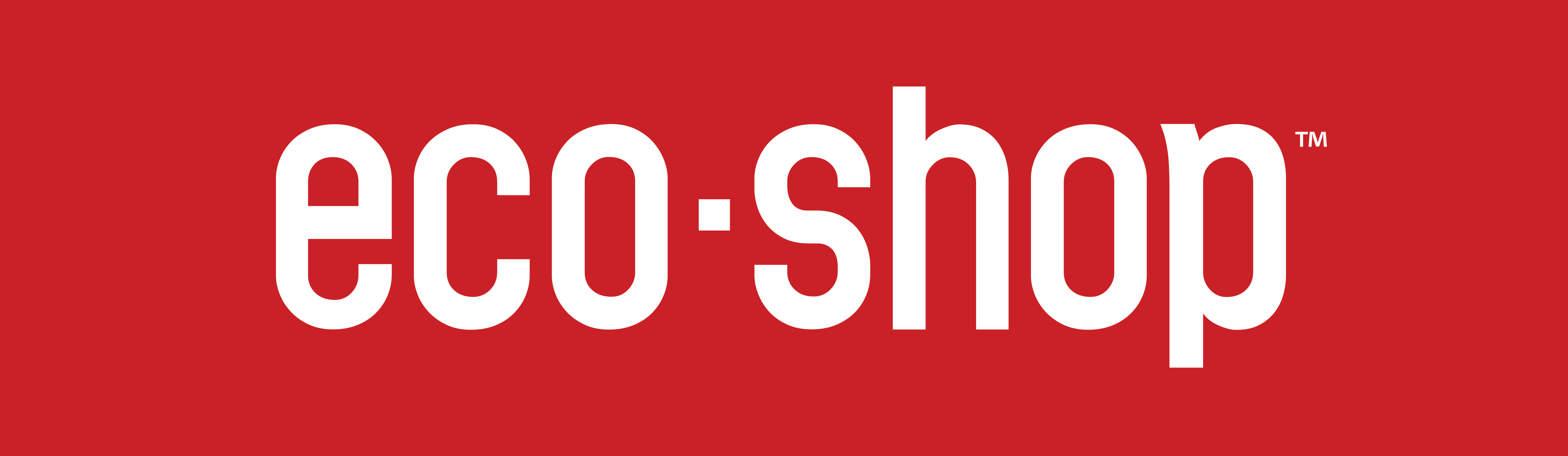

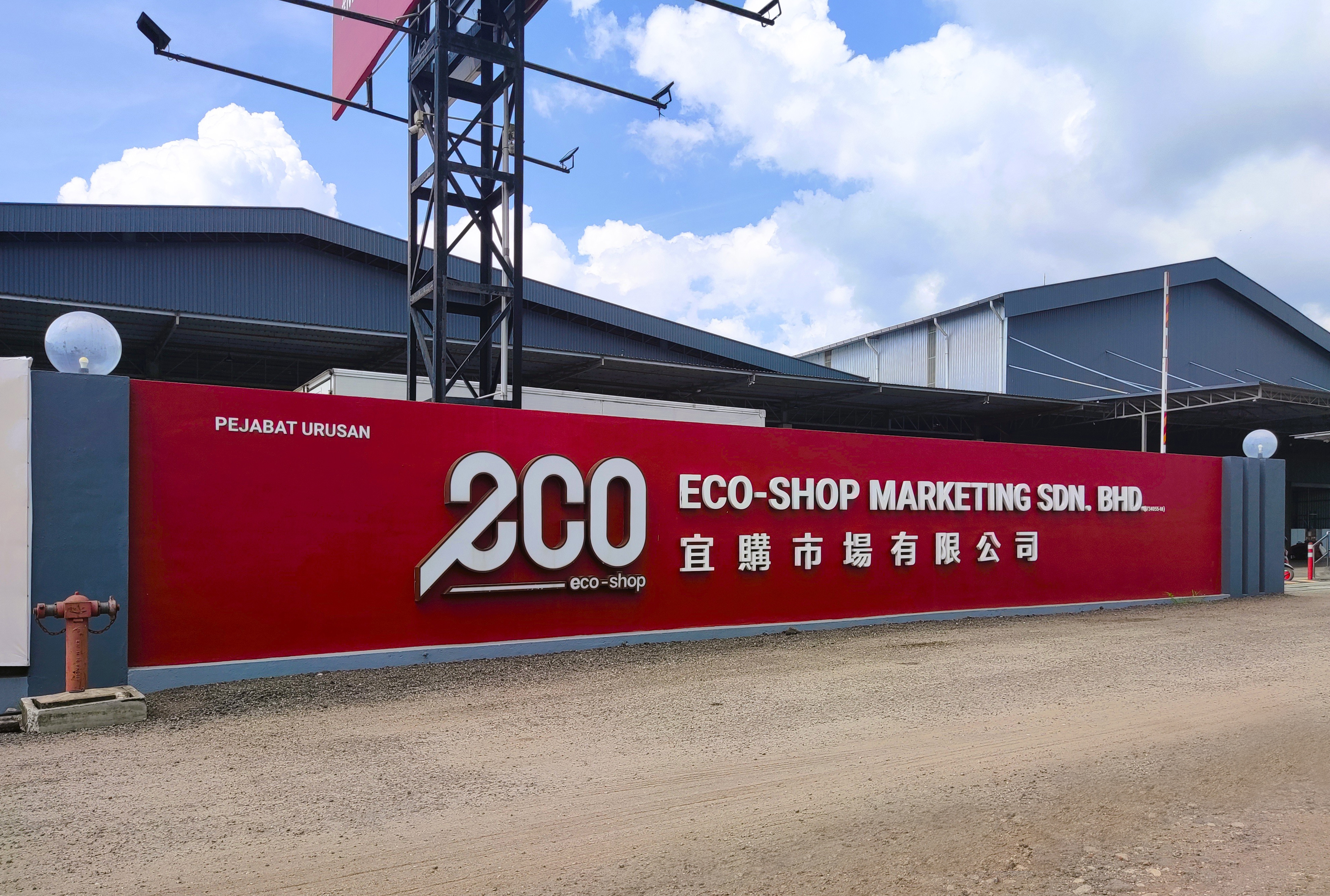
- The headquarters in Jementah, Segamat
- Company type: Public
- Traded as: MYX: 5337
- Industry: Retail
- Founded: September 2003; 22 years ago
- Founder: Dato’ Sri Lee Kar Whatt
- Headquarters: Segamat, Johor, Malaysia
- Number of locations: 371 (2025)
- Area served: Malaysia
- Revenue: RM 2.787 billion (2025)
- Number of employees: 8,485 (2025)
- Subsidiaries: eco•plus eco•bakery
- Website: www.eco-shop.com.my

Eco-Shop (stylized as eco•shop) is a Malaysian convenience store company selling products such as home improvement items, food, drinks, and toys. It is well-known for setting all its products at only RM 2.60 each. As of the financial year 2025, Eco-Shop operates more than 370 outlets across the country.

== History ==
In May 2002, Dato’ Sri Lee Kar Whatt, alongside his relatives and Pang Kueh Khim, opened Kedai Ekonomi Hari-Hari in Kota Bharu, Kelantan. Not long after that, he closed down the shop and established Eco Shop Marketing in September 2003, alongside his brother Lee Tiong Bin, Kueh Khim, and a third-party investor. Eventually, they opened the first RM 2 store in Gemas Baru, Johor in the same year.

In 2010, the company established its headquarters and new warehouse facility in Jementah, a small town in Segamat, Johor. Eco-Shop celebrated the opening of its 100th outlet in 2018 in Gombak, Selangor and its 300th outlet in 2024 in Nu Sentral, Kuala Lumpur.

== Financials ==
Finances from 2022 to 2025
Year	Revenue (RM billion)	Profit after tax and minority interest (RM million)	Number of the workforce	Number of stores
2022	1.574	26.958	-	227
2023	1.99	104.951	6,656	240
2024	2.404	177.28	7,420	297
2025	2.786	205.034	8,485	371

== Gallery ==
Eco-Shop dan Eco-Plus outlets in Seremban

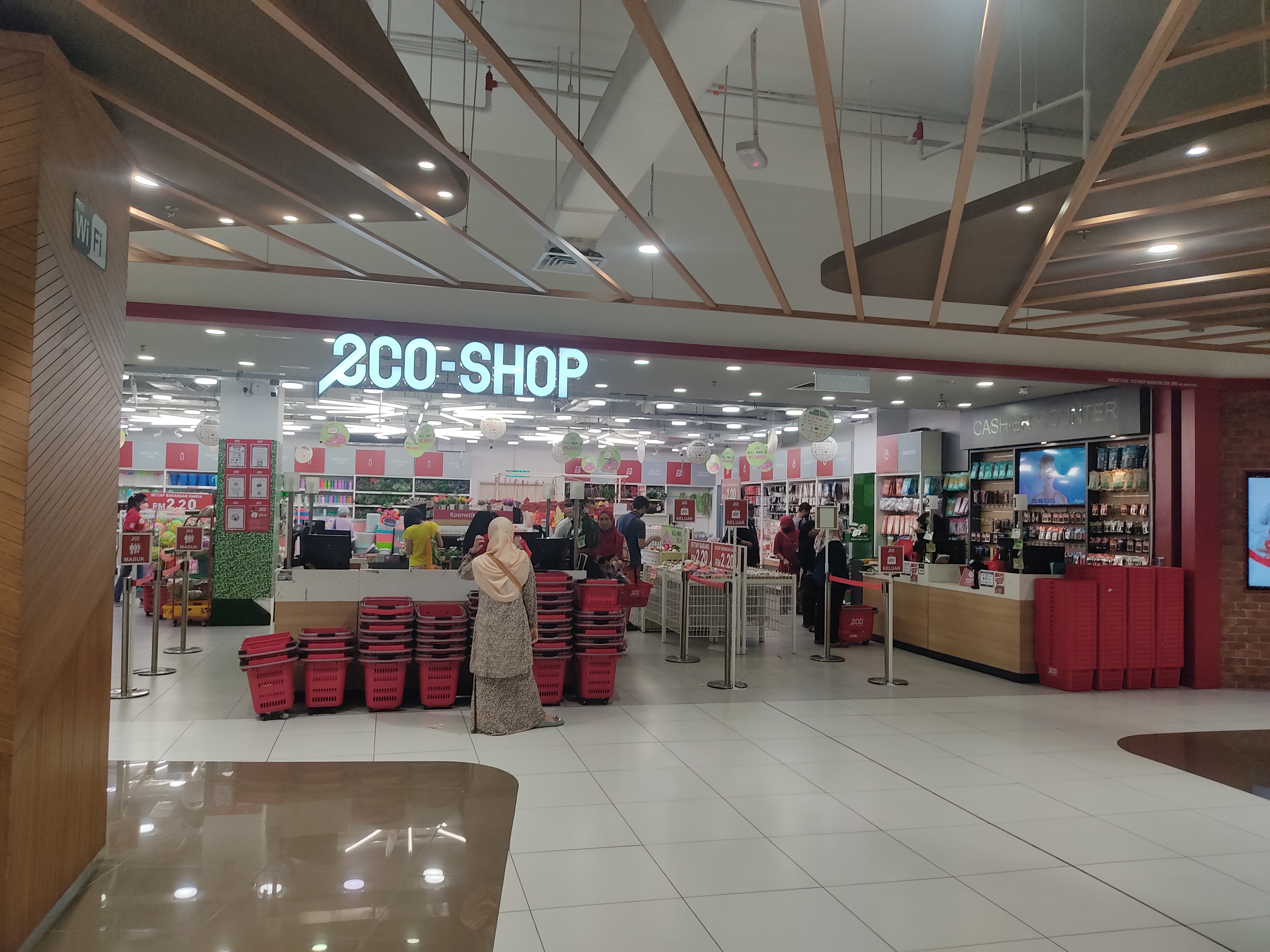
The outlet in AEON Taman Maluri

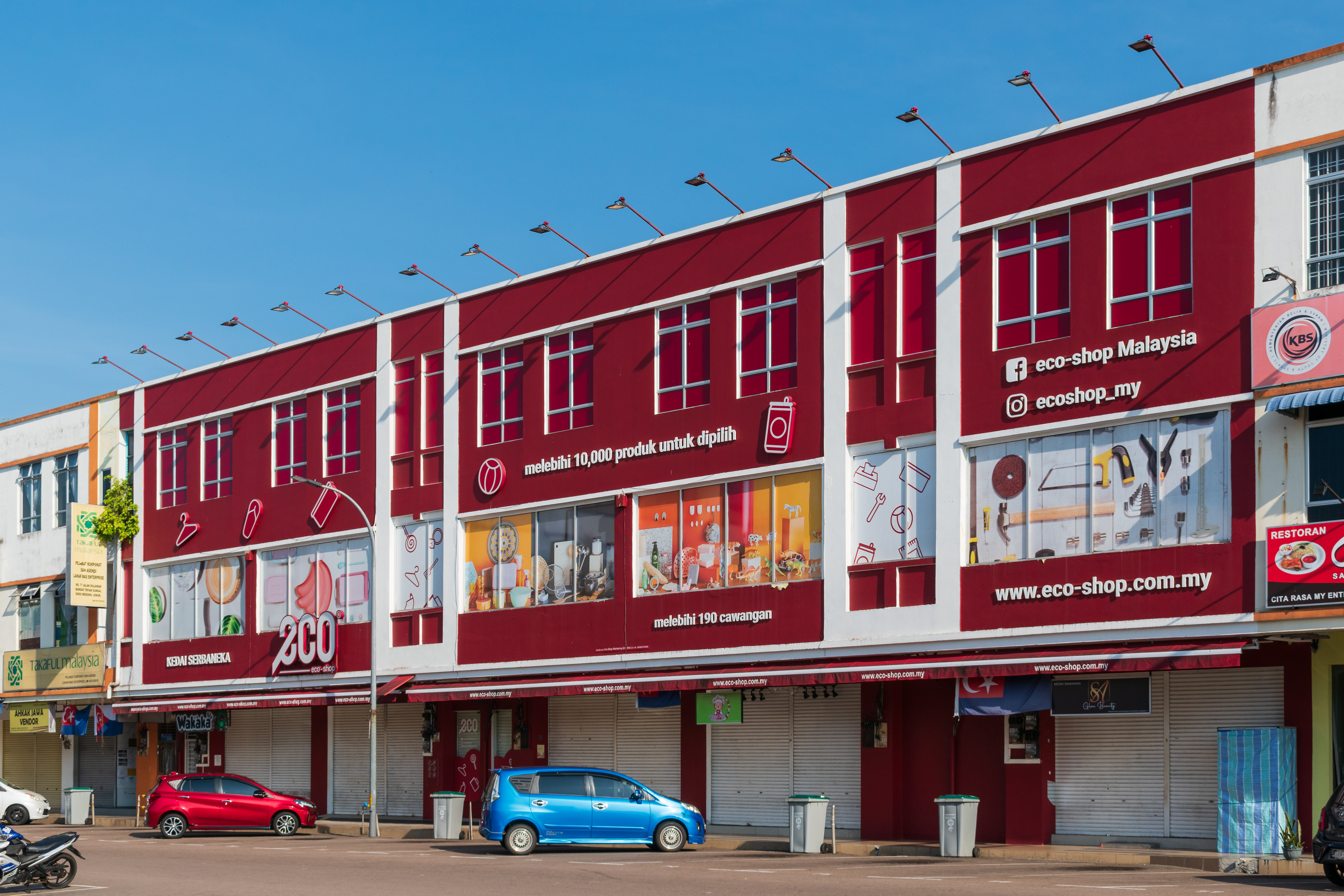
The outlet in Mersing

The outlet in Sri Petaling
