= Johor State Route J230 =

Johor Route 230
- Jalan Kampung Raja–FELDA Maokil

Route information
- Length: 22 km (14 mi)
- Existed: 2006–present
- History: Completed in March 2010

Major junctions
- Northwest end: Bukit Kepong
- J32 State Route J32; FT 1417 Federal Route 1417
- Southeast end: FELDA Maokil

Location
- Country: Malaysia
- Primary destinations: Muar, Pagoh, Lenga, Bukit Kepong, Segamat, Labis, Chaah

Highway system
- Highways in Malaysia; Expressways; Federal; State

Johor State Route J230, Jalan Kampung Raja–FELDA Maokil is a major road in Johor, Malaysia.

== Route background ==
The State Route J230 connects Bukit Kepong at northwest and FELDA Maokil at southeast.

== History ==
The road originally was the village road to Kampung Raja. The upgrade and extension construction started in 2006 and completed in March 2010, which the original completion date is in October 2009.

Before State Route J230 existed, FELDA Maokil can be only accessed through Federal Route 1 at Chaah.

== Features ==
- Maokil Forest Reserved Area
- Alternative roads from Bukit Kepong to Chaah and Yong Peng

== Junction lists ==
The entire route is located in Muar District, Johor.

Legend:

- I/C - Interchange, I/S - Intersection, RSA - Rest and service area, OBR - Overhead bridge restaurant, R/R - Restaurant and rest plaza, L/B - Layby, V/P - Vista point, TN - tunnel, T/P - Toll plaza, BR - Bridge
- C - Cloverleaf, S - Stack, T-A - Trumpet-A, T-B - Trumpet-B, DT - Directional-T/Y, SDT - Semi-Directional-T/Y, P-Y - Partial-Y, D - Diamond, P-C - Partial cloverleaf, D-D - Diverging diamond, D-R - Direct ramp

Location	km	Name	Destinations	Notes
Bukit Kepong		Jalan Muar–Labis	J32 Johor State Route J32 – Muar, Pagoh, Bukit Kepong, Segamat, Labis, Gemas, Kuantan; North–South Expressway Southern Route / AH2 – Kuala Lumpur, Seremban, Malacca	T-junctions
Bukit Kepong		Kampung Tui	J167 Jalan Kampung Tui – Kampung Tui	T-junctions
Bukit Kepong		Kampung Raja		
Bukit Kepong		Kampung Sawah Laku	Jalan Bukit Panjang	T-junctions
FELDA Maokil		Maokil Forest Reserved Area		
FELDA Maokil		FELDA Maokil	FT 1417 Malaysia Federal Route 1417 – Segamat, Labis, Bekok, Chaah, Yong Peng, Ayer Hitam; North–South Expressway Southern Route / AH2 – Ayer Hitam, Johor Bahru, Singapore; Jalan Kilang Kelapa Sawit Maokil – Maokil Palm Oil Factory	Roundabout
1.000 mi = 1.609 km; 1.000 km = 0.621 mi
