= Genuang railway halt =

Railway station in Malaysia

Coordinates: 2°29′18″N 102°53′03″E

Genuang

General information
- Other names: Malay: ݢنواڠ (Jawi); Chinese: 银旺; Tamil: கெனுவாங்
- Location: Genuang, Segamat District; Johor; Malaysia
- System: KTM Intercity railway halt
- Owner: Railway Assets Corporation
- Operator: Keretapi Tanah Melayu
- Line: West Coast Line
- Platforms: 1 side platform
- Tracks: 3

Construction
- Structure type: At-grade

History
- Opened: 1909
- Rebuilt: 2023
- Electrified: 2024

Former services
| Preceding station | Keretapi Tanah Melayu | Following station |
|---|---|---|
| Segamat towards Padang Besar | West Coast Line | Tenang towards Woodlands |
Location

The Genuang railway halt was a Malaysian railway halt located at and named after the town of Genuang, Segamat District, Johor.

KTM Intercity train services were only provided at this halt, the station will be a freight station after the completion of Gemas-JB EDTP project.

== See also ==
- Rail transport in Malaysia
