= Jalan Kampung Raja =

Jalan Kampung Raja may refer to:

- Malaysia Federal Route 84, a federal road in Terengganu, Malaysia
- Johor State Route J139, a state road in Muar District, Johor, Malaysia
- Johor State Route J230, a state road in Muar District, Johor, Malaysia
