= Segamat High School =

Coordinates: 2°30′56.6″N 102°48′52.1″E

The Segamat High School (Malay: Sekolah Tinggi Segamat) is a high school in Segamat District, Johor, Malaysia. One of the oldest schools in the area, it was established in 1926. The first Principal was J.C. Mc Heyzer, with V.A. Matthew as deputy.

Located in Segamat near Istana Hinggap and the Rock Garden, it offers English styled education modelled on the British curricular system. The school started with 50 students in one main building. Now, it has around 1,702 students and 104 teachers. The school covers 11 acres (4.5 ha) with 17 blocks. Gurdial Singh was the first Asian principal. Before Malaysia gained independence, the school had an Englishman as its principal. The school has a colonial style main block.

== See also ==
- Education in Malaysia
