= Batu Anam =

Town in Segamat, Johor, Malaysia

Coordinates: 2°35′N 102°43′E

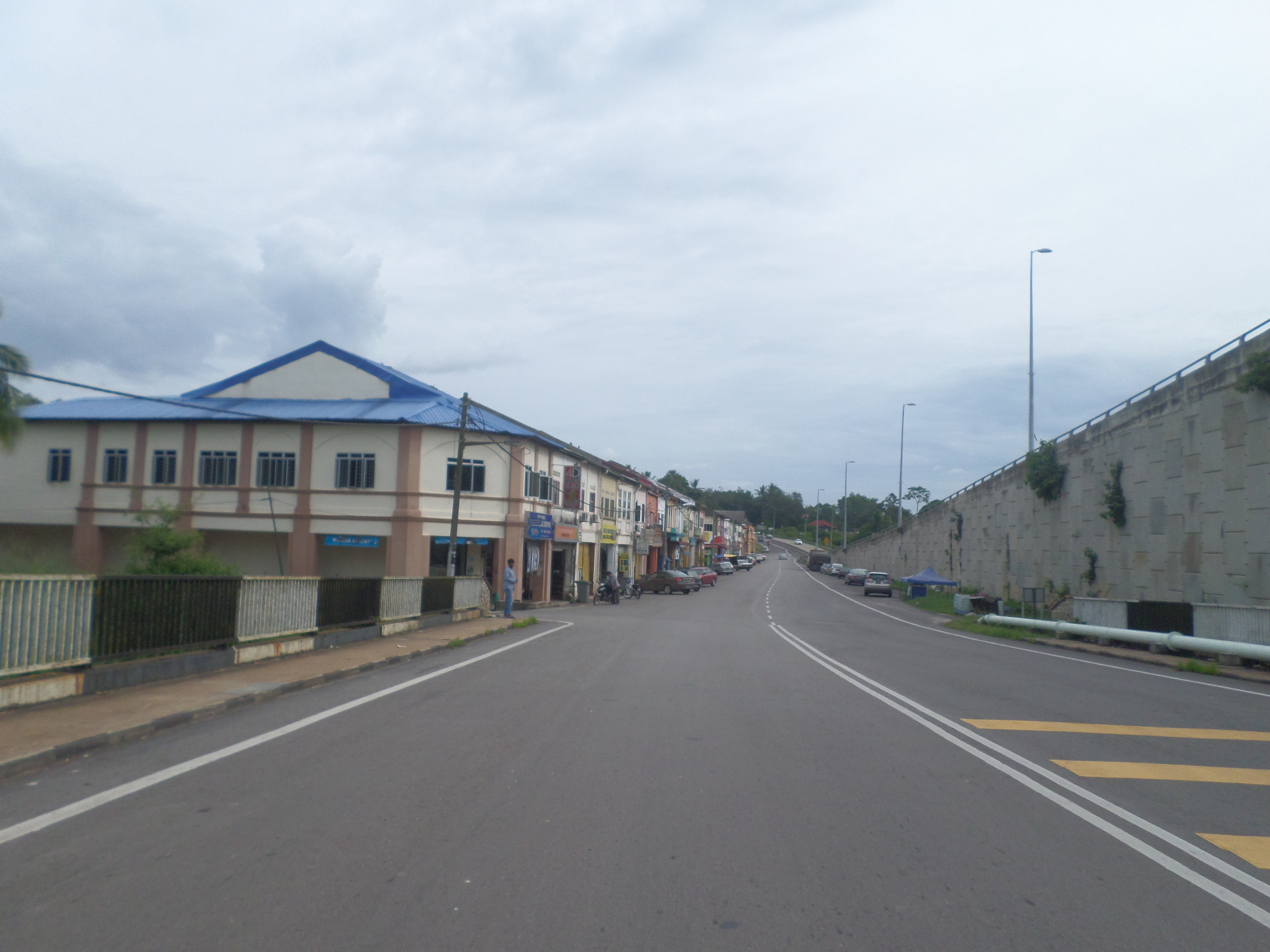

- Batu Anam in Segamat District
- Country: Malaysia
- State: Johor
- District: Segamat
- Postcode: 85100; 73430 (Palong Timur)
- Area codes: 07-948; 07-949; 06-466 (Palong Timur)

Batu Anam is a town in the northern part of Segamat District, Johor, Malaysia. The town is the home to the 4th Royal Artillery Regiment of the Malaysian Armed Forces and the Royal Malaysian Police Training Centre (PULAPOL). It is about halfway between downtown Segamat and Gemas, Negeri Sembilan.

== Economy ==
Batu Anam is surrounded by rubber and oil palm plantations and the more prominent plantations are Sungei Senarut Estate, Paya Lang Estate, Tambang Estate and Gomali Estate with a number of smaller estates and smallholdings surrounding it. There is an old rubber factory known as H&C Latex, now not in use. Paya Lang Estate had a beautiful 9-hole Golf Course which is now planted with Palm Oil trees after the plantation was sold to local interests.

== Education ==
Batu Anam offers both lower and higher level education. It hosts Sekolah Kebangsaan Batu Anam, SRJK (C) Hwa Nan and SRJK (T) Batu Anam for primary school. For secondary school, the town is served by SMK Batu Anam, SMK Sri Kenangan and SMK Sains Segamat - located 2 km from Batu Anam town. For higher education, Batu Anam is a host of Kolej Komuniti Segamat 2 (KKS2) and Universiti Teknologi MARA (UiTM) Johor. Royal Malaysian Police Training Centre (PULAPOL) Segamat Campus is located 8 km from Batu Anam town. A new technical higher learning institution operated by the Human Resources Department (JTK); Centre for Instructor & Advanced Skill Training (CIAST) Southern Region located opposite SMK Sains Segamat is currently under construction.

== Transportation ==
The town is served by Batu Anam Railway Station of Keretapi Tanah Melayu. The station is currently mothballed; passengers are advised to access Gemas station instead, which is the nearest to Batu Anam, approximately 8 km away.

As for road transportation, Batu Anam is served by the town's main road - Federal Route 1 which links the town to Gemas and Segamat. Besides the main road, Jalan Pulapol connects Batu Anam to Jementah and Universiti Teknologi MARA (UiTM) Johor Campus while Jalan Sepang Loi connects Batu Anam with a number of rural settlements and plantation estates such as Kampung Paya Lang, Kampung Sepang Loi, Kampung Tambang, Kampung Pudu and Felda Palong Timur.

The access road to Felda Palong Timur from Kampung Sepang Loi is the second gateway to Negeri Sembilan from Johor besides Federal Route 1, as it links Batu Anam with Felda Palong Timur as well as Felda Palong in Negeri Sembilan's Jempol District. It is the only road that directly connects Segamat with Jempol.
