= Sungai Karas =

- new village

Other transcription(s)
  - Chinese: 双溪加叻
- Coordinates: 2.3554°N 103.0383°E
- Country: Malaysia
- State: Johor
- District: Segamat

Government
  - Local government: Labis District Council
- Time zone: UTC+8 (MST)
  - Summer (DST): Not observed
- Postal code: 85300
- Website: mdlabis.gov.my

Sungai Karas is a Chinese new village in Labis, Segamat District, Johor, Malaysia, 3 km south of Labis. It has about 100 houses, while two new housing areas have about 70 houses.

== Economy ==
Most villagers are rubber tappers at their six ekar rubber trees. In the last 10 years some rubber trees were replaced by those producing palm oil. Most jobs in the rubber jungle are done by old villagers, while most young people left their home to work outside the village.

== Education ==
There is one Chinese Primary School, SJK(C) Karas.
