= Batu Anam railway halt =

Railway station in Malaysia

Coordinates: 2.5813199°N 102.7022381°E

Batu Anam

General information
- Location: Jalan Sungai Senarut, Batu Anam, Segamat District; Johor; Malaysia
- System: KTM Intercity railway halt
- Owner: Keretapi Tanah Melayu
- Operator: Keretapi Tanah Melayu
- Platforms: 1
- Tracks: 1

Construction
- Structure type: At-grade
- Parking: Available, free.

Other information
- Status: Inactive for passenger use Currently serves as an operations station.
- Classification: Halt

Former services
Preceding station	Keretapi Tanah Melayu	Following station
Gemas towards Padang Besar	West Coast Line	Segamat towards Woodlands
Location

The Batu Anam railway station was a Malaysian railway halt located at Batu Anam, Segamat District, Johor.

The station is between Gemas and Segamat stations.

KTM Intercity train services were provided at this halt, however the station is currently not in active passenger service and only serves as an operations station for train crossings as well as hosting the yard and depot for the Gemas-Johor Bahru Electrified Double Track Project (EDTP) which is managed by both KTMB and YTL-SIPP. The station will be dismantled upon completion of the EDTP by 2025.

== See also ==
- Rail transport in Malaysia
