= Tenang railway halt =

Malaysian railway halt

Coordinates: 2°27′54″N 102°57′25″E

Tenang

General information
- Location: Tenang, Segamat District; Johor; Malaysia
- System: KTM railway halt
- Owner: Keretapi Tanah Melayu
- Operator: Keretapi Tanah Melayu
- Platforms: 1
- Tracks: 3

Construction
- Structure type: At-grade
- Parking: Available, free.

Other information
- Status: Closed as part for double-tracking and electrification project, but not a part for renovation
- Classification: Halt

Former services
Preceding station	Keretapi Tanah Melayu	Following station
Genuang towards Padang Besar	West Coast Line	Labis towards Woodlands
Location

The Tenang railway station was a Malaysian railway halt located at and named after the town of Tenang, Segamat District, Johor. This halt did not provide KTM Intercity train services.

== Closure ==
Tenang station closed when the station was not selected for rebuilding as part of the Gemas-Johor Bahru double-tracking and electrification project.

== See also ==
- Rail transport in Malaysia
