= Bekok =

Coordinates: 2°18′N 103°08′E

Bekok 彼咯
- Mukim
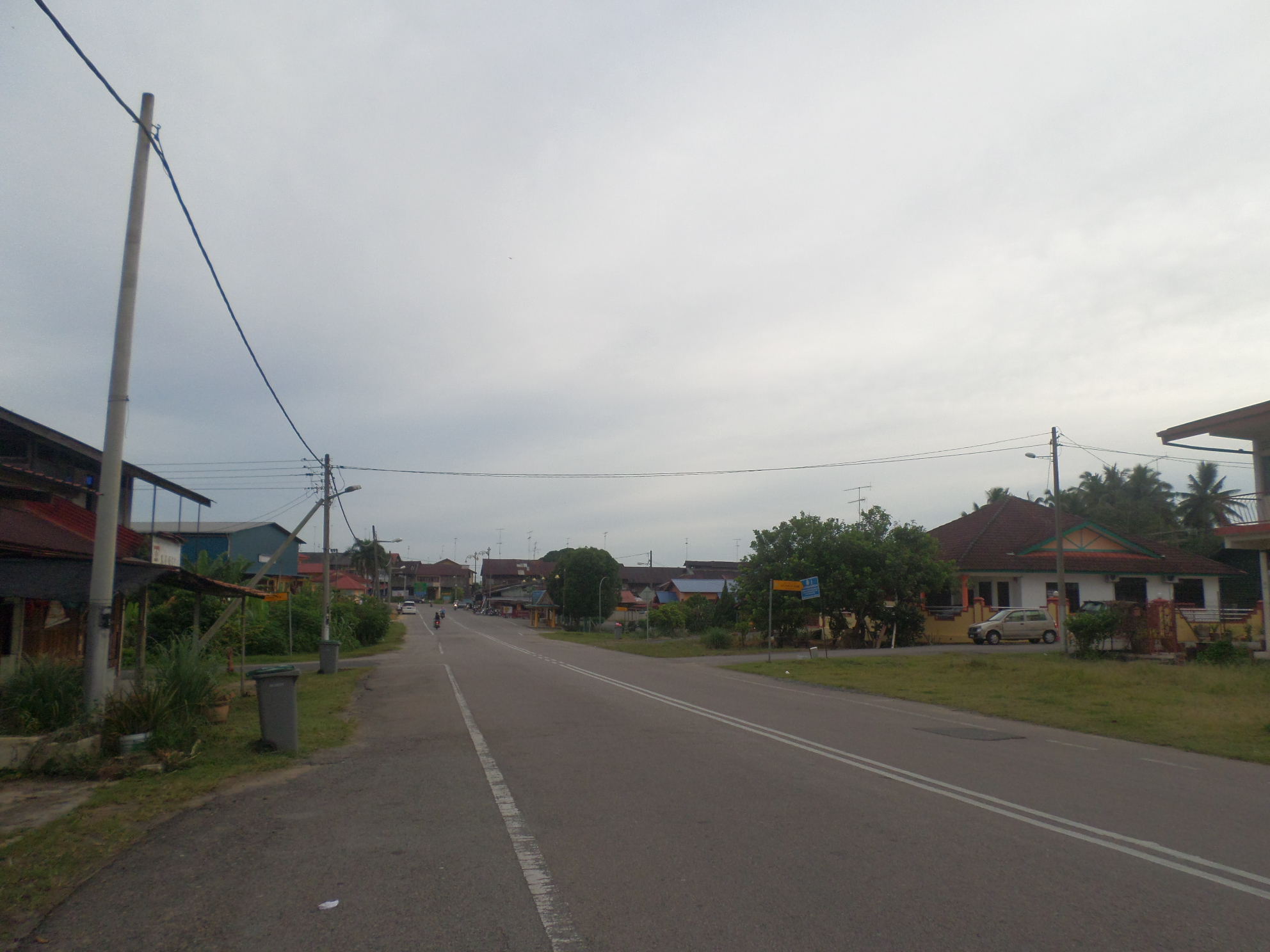
- Interactive map of Bekok 彼咯
- Country: Malaysia
- State: Johor
- District: Segamat

Area
  - Total: 785 km^{2} (303 sq mi)

Bekok is a mukim in Segamat District, Johor, Malaysia. It is the western entrance to Endau Rompin National Park and has a waterfall known as Sungai Bantang Waterfall. Bekok also houses several aborigine settlements (Perkampungan Orang Asli), such as Kampung Kudong and Kampung Kemidak.

During the pre-independence period, this small town was a "Black Area" known for strong communist resistance against the British government.

== Name ==
The town's name probably originally arrived from the Hakka dialect word "Mukok", which means "the corner", where the town is in fact a remote town located roughly about 10 km from the junction of the Federal Route 1 and later accessible via railway.

== Geology ==
Bekok in Segamat District

At an area of 785 km^{2}, it is the largest mukim in Segamat District.

== History ==
The earliest Malay settlement set by the Penghulu (Village Head) was located near the bridge of the Bekok River on the way to Sg. Bantang waterfall, at a junction to Sg. Bekok Estate. It's said the first Penghulu was Sulaiman Bin Ain. He was then succeeded by his son Alam Bin Sulaiman. The name Bekok was said to be taken from the local fauna found called "Burung Punai Bakok" when he first opened the area. There was once a Penghulu house near the junction of Sg. Bekok Estate with inscription on the concrete apron written "1926" at the entrance. Penghulu Alam died on 14 August 1969 at the age of 89 years. He was then succeeded by his son Ismail Bin Alam. After the demise of Penghulu Ismail on 18 September 2000, the tradition of Penghulu from the same family has been stopped. Now the Penghulu is a position open to all eligible candidate under the Local Johor Government.

== Demographics ==
The following is based on Department of Statistics Malaysia 2010 census.

Ethnic groups in Bekok, 2010
Ethnicity	Population	Percentage
Bumiputera, Malay	320	19.23%
Chinese	1,151	69.17%
Indian	115	6.91%
Other Bumiputera	9	0.54%
Others	7	0.42%
Non-Malaysian	62	3.73%

== Education ==
=== Primary school ===
- Sekolah Kebangsaan Seri Bekok
- Sekolah Kebangsaan Kampong Kudung
- Sekolah Jenis Kebangsaan (Tamil) Bekok
- Sekolah Jenis Kebangsaan (Cina) Bekok

=== Secondary school ===
- Sekolah Menengah Kebangsaan Bekok

== Tourist attractions ==
- Mini Hakka Museum
- Sg. Bantang Waterfall

== Transportation ==
Bekok is accessible via road, specifically State Route J150 which connects Chaah and Bekok to Paloh in Kluang District. Its first junction is located about 4 km from Chaah via Federal Route 1. Bekok is located 10 km from the junction and 18 km from Paloh.

Bekok is also accessible by train via the Bekok railway station.

== See also ==
- Paloh
- Chaah
- Labis
- Segamat
- Pekan Air Panas
