= Air Panas =

Town in Johor, Malaysia

- Town

Other transcription(s)
  - Jawi: ڤکن اءير ڤانس
  - Chinese: 阿逸班那
- Air Panas in Johor, Malay Peninsular and Malaysia Air Panas (Peninsular Malaysia) Air Panas (Malaysia)
- Coordinates: 2°28′24.9″N 103°03′16.6″E
- Country: Malaysia
- State: Johor
- District: Segamat
- Time zone: UTC+8 (MYT)
- Postal code: 85300

Air Panas (Jawi: ڤکن اءير ڤانس, Chinese: 阿逸班那), also spelt as Ayer Panas, is a small town in Labis, Segamat District, Johor, Malaysia, which is named after the hot springs available there. It is located about 14 km from Labis town via Jalan Ayer Panas (Johor State Route J151). The town is also known as Tenang (not to be confused with Tenang Stesen, another town also located in Segamat District). A majority of the residents of the town are Chinese and Malay communities.

Pekan Air Panas is famed for its hot springs. Besides the hot springs, the town also houses several aborigine settlements (Perkampungan Orang Asli) including Bekok and also has mata kucing farms. Mata kucing (a.k.a. longan) is a small lychee-like local fruit with brown skin.

Taka Melor waterfall is situated around 7 km from Pekan Air Panas. It is a popular weekend getaway for the locals to observe nature and spend quality time with their family and friends.

== Name ==
Air Panas is named after the hot springs available near the town. The town is also known as Bukit. Most of the businesses and facilities are located at Pekan Air Panas. The settlement was opened on Thursday, 3 December 1806. The name Tenang comes from the settler who first opened the settlement, Tuan Haji Muhammad Arifin bin Aladin aka Syed Kamarul Ariffin bin Syed Allauddin of Pagaruyung when he found the new settlement area, which was so serene (hence the Malay word Tenang). After he performed his prayer, he decided to name this place with the name Kampung Tenang (next to Pekan Air Panas), also known as Tok Tenang. Most of Tok Tenang's descendants live in this area and Labis town.

== Education ==
Educational institutions in Air Panas encompass only primary education. There are 1 national primary schools (Sekolah Kebangsaan) whose medium of instruction is Malay language and 1 Chinese primary school (Sekolah Jenis Kebangsaan).

- SJK (C) Tenang (登能华小)
- SK Pekan Air Panas

== See also ==
- Segamat
- Labis
