= Johor State Route J14 =

Road in Johor, Malaysia

Johor Route 14

Route information
- Length: 2.30 km (1.43 mi)

Major junctions
- Northwest end: Kampung Baharu
- J16 State Route J16; J249 Jalan Kampung Baru Sri Tengah; FT 50 Federal Route 50
- Southeast end: Jalan Mersing

Location
- Country: Malaysia

Highway system
- Highways in Malaysia; Expressways; Federal; State

Jalan Kampung Sembrong Dalam (Johor State Route J14), is a main road in Kluang District, Johor, Malaysia. The 2.30 km (1.43 mi) route connecting Kampung Sembrong to Paloh and Kluang.

== Festures ==
- Some road sections only allow one direction at the same time.

== Junction lists ==
The entire route is located in Kluang District, Johor.

Location	km	mi	Destinations	Notes
Kampung Baharu			J16 Jalan Paloh – Paloh, Yong Peng, Segamat, Kluang Towm Centre; J249 Jalan Kampung Baru Sri Tengah	T-junctions
Kampung Sembrong	1.0	0.62		
Kluang			FT 50 Jalan Mersing – Batu Pahat, Parit Raja, Ayer Hitam, Kluang Town Centre, Kahang, Mersing	T-junctions
1.000 mi = 1.609 km; 1.000 km = 0.621 mi
