= Genuang =

Human settlement in Johor, Malaysia

Coordinates: 2°29′N 102°53′E

Genuang is a small town in Segamat District, Johor, Malaysia. The town is situated near Segamat.
