= Bekok railway station =

Railway station in Bekok, Malaysia

Bekok

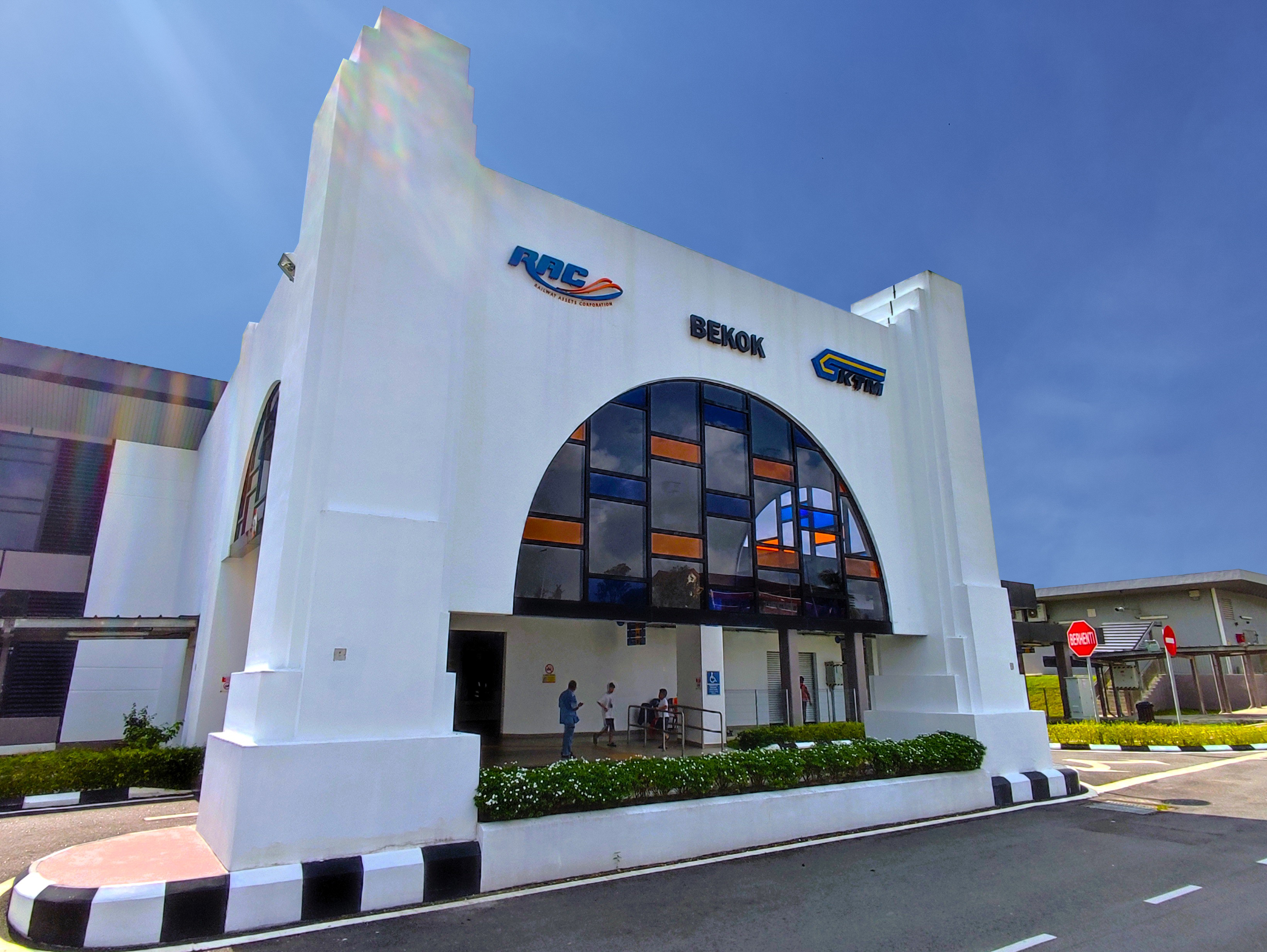

General information
- Other names: Malay: بيکوق (Jawi); Chinese: 彼咯; Tamil: பெக்கோக்
- Location: Bekok, Segamat District; Johor; Malaysia
- Coordinates: 2°17′48.4″N 103°7′44.7″E
- Owner: Railway Assets Corporation
- Operator: Keretapi Tanah Melayu
- Line: West Coast Line
- Platforms: 2 side platforms
- Tracks: 2
- Connections: Bus (Mas Muafakat Johor (LB-002), twice a day)

Construction
- Structure type: At-grade
- Parking: Available, free
- Accessible: Yes

History
- Opened: 1909
- Rebuilt: 19 August 2024; 2 years ago
- Electrified: 2025

Services
Preceding station	ETS	Following station
Labis towards KL Sentral	KL Sentral–JB Sentral (Platinum)	Paloh towards JB Sentral
Labis towards Padang Besar	Padang Besar–JB Sentral (Gold)	Paloh towards JB Sentral
Location

The Bekok railway station is railway located at and named after the town of Bekok, in the Segamat District of the state Johor. This railway station is served by KTM ETS service towards Padang Besar, KL Sentral and JB Sentral.

As part of the Gemas-Johor Bahru electrification and double-tracking project (EDTP), the original station was closed on 23 June 2021 and replaced with a temporary station at Jalan Station with makeshift platforms. The temporary station was replaced with the current new station, opened in August 2024, with the introduction of new KTM ETS services on 30 August 2025, operating alongside KTM Intercity services.

Since 1 January 2026, KTM Intercity train services no longer serve this station, with the termination of its Ekpres Selatan service.

== See also ==
- Rail transport in Malaysia
