= Tenang Stesen =

Tenang
- Town in Malaysia
- Tenang Stesen

Other transcription(s)
  - Jawi: تنڠ ستيسين
  - Chinese: 丁能
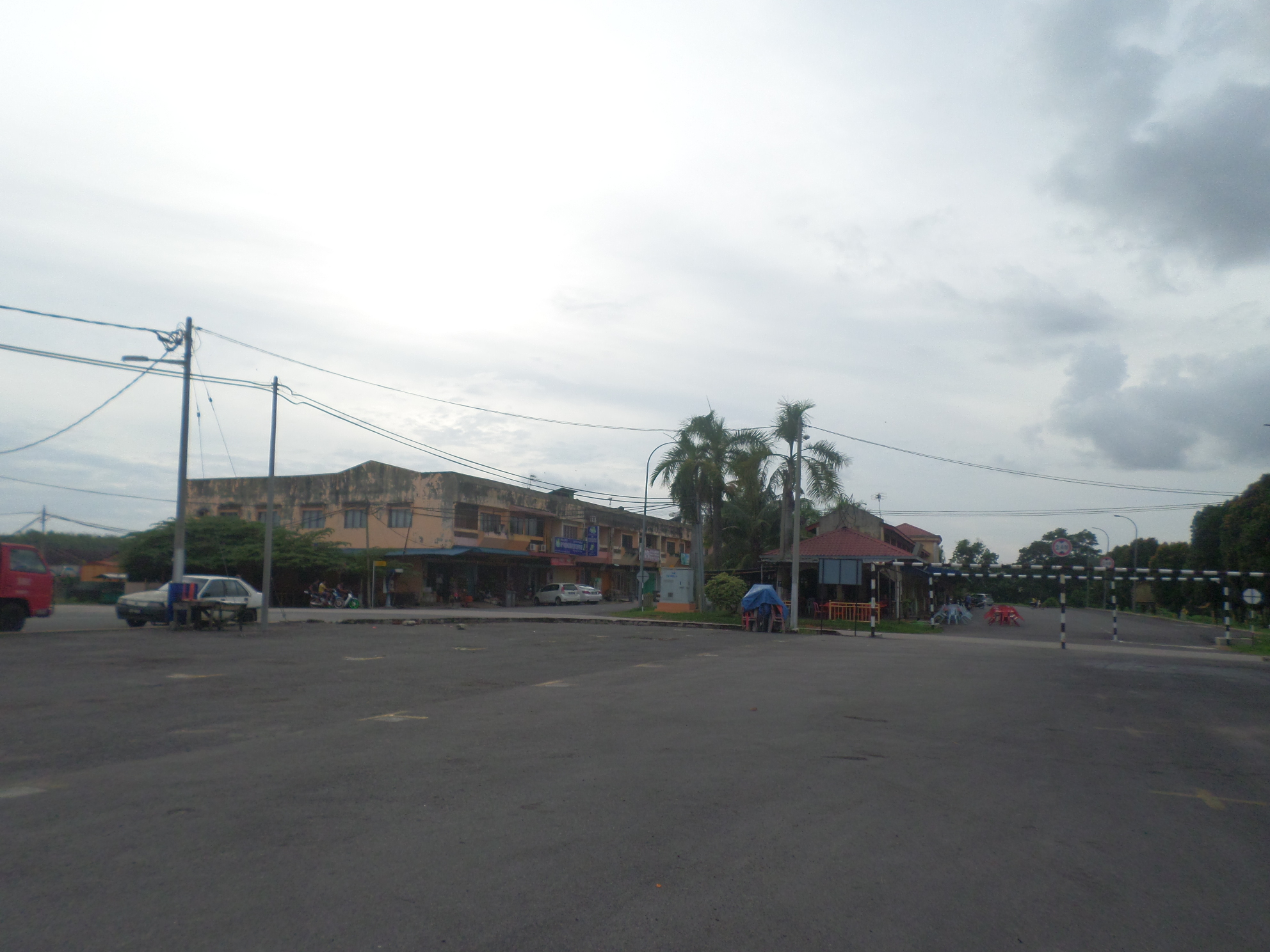
- Tenang Stesen

- Jelapang in Johor, Malay Peninsular and Malaysia Tenang (Peninsular Malaysia) Tenang (Malaysia)
- Coordinates: 2°28′N 102°57′E
- Country: Malaysia
- State: Johor
- District: Segamat
- Time zone: UTC+8 (MYT)
- Postal code: 85300

Tenang Stesen (Jawi: تنڠ ستيسين; Chinese: 丁能), commonly known as “Tenang”, is a small town in Segamat District, Johor, Malaysia. The town is located between Genuang and Labis. Pekan Air Panas is located in the same district also named as Tenang.

== Transportation ==
- Tenang railway station (abandoned)
