= Gemas Baru =

- Hamlet
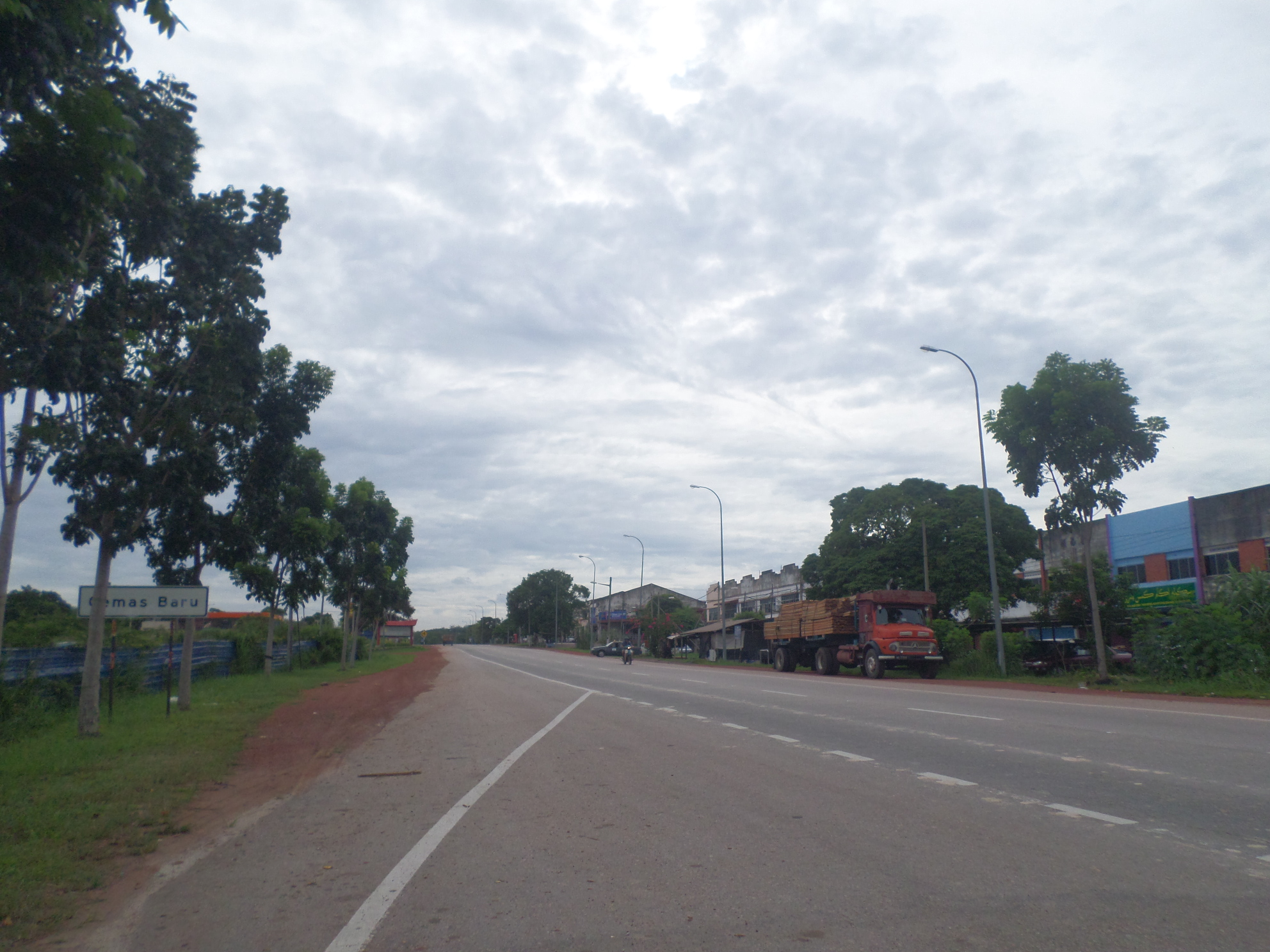
- A section of Federal Route 1 in Gemas Baru.

- Flag

- Location in Johor
- Coordinates: 2°35′N 102°38′E
- Country: Malaysia
- State: Johor
- District: Segamat

Government
  - Local Authority: Segamat Municipal Council
- Time zone: UTC+8 (MST)
- Postcode: 73400, 85100
- Dialling code: 07-949
- Police: Segamat / Tampin
- Fire: Segamat / Gemas

Gemas Baharu in Segamat District

Gemas Baru (New Gemas in English) is a small town in Segamat District, Johor, Malaysia. The town is located about 1 km (0.62 mi) from the Johor-Negeri Sembilan border. The original town centre of Gemas is located just within the Negeri Sembilan state side of the border and also shared the same postal code 73400.

To the southwest stands the famed Mount Ledang, also known as Mount Ophir, with a height of 1,276 m (4,186 ft).

== History ==
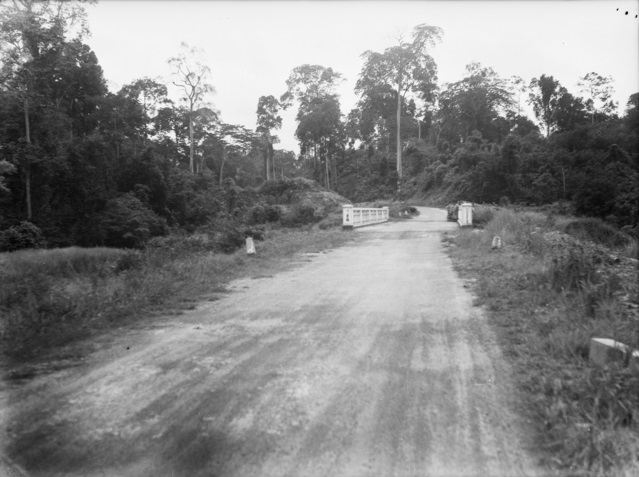
Gemencheh Bridge (middle distance) in 1945. More than 700 troops of the Japanese Imperial Guards Division were slaughtered here, with the Australians losing 8 men and suffering 80 wounded.

During the Battle of Malaya in the Second World War, Gemencheh Bridge near Gemas was the site of a fierce battle between the Imperial Japanese Army and the 2/30th Battalion, 8th Division, Australian Imperial Force (AIF). Commanding Officer of the Battalion was Lieutenant Colonel Frederick "Black Jack" Galleghan. Gemencheh Bridge was a bridge over the Kelamah River (Sungai Kelamah in Malay) that connected Gemas with the larger neighbouring town of Tampin. The Japanese had passed through Tampin and needed to cross the bridge to reach Gemas.

On 14 January 1942, "B" Company of the 2/30th Battalion, launched an ambush against the Japanese in the hope of preventing them from advancing further south. As the advancing Japanese soldiers passed by the ambush site, the bridge was blown. The battle following the ambush, and a further battle closer to Gemas, lasted two days. It ended with the Australian withdrawal through Gemas to Fort Rose Estate.

Four days later, another encounter between Japanese and Allied soldiers took place near Parit Sulong during the Battle of Malaya. Allied troops, including the Australian 2/19th and 2/29th Battalions, were surrounded and routed there.

A memorial remembering fallen Australians now stands by the site of the destroyed Gemencheh Bridge in Federal Route 1.

Recently, a documentary titled The Battle of Gemas was jointly undertaken by Tahan Rata Filem and AVI to expand on the importance of this battle in the context of the Battle of Malaya and the fall of Singapore.

== Transportation ==
=== Road ===
Gemas Baru is connected to other towns by Federal Route 1. Route Federal Route 1 links Gemas Baru with Seremban, the capital of Negeri Sembilan, and Johor Bahru, the capital of Johor.

== See also ==
- Segamat
- Gemas
