= Paloh =

Coordinates: 2°25′N 111°15′E

Paloh 巴罗
- Mukim
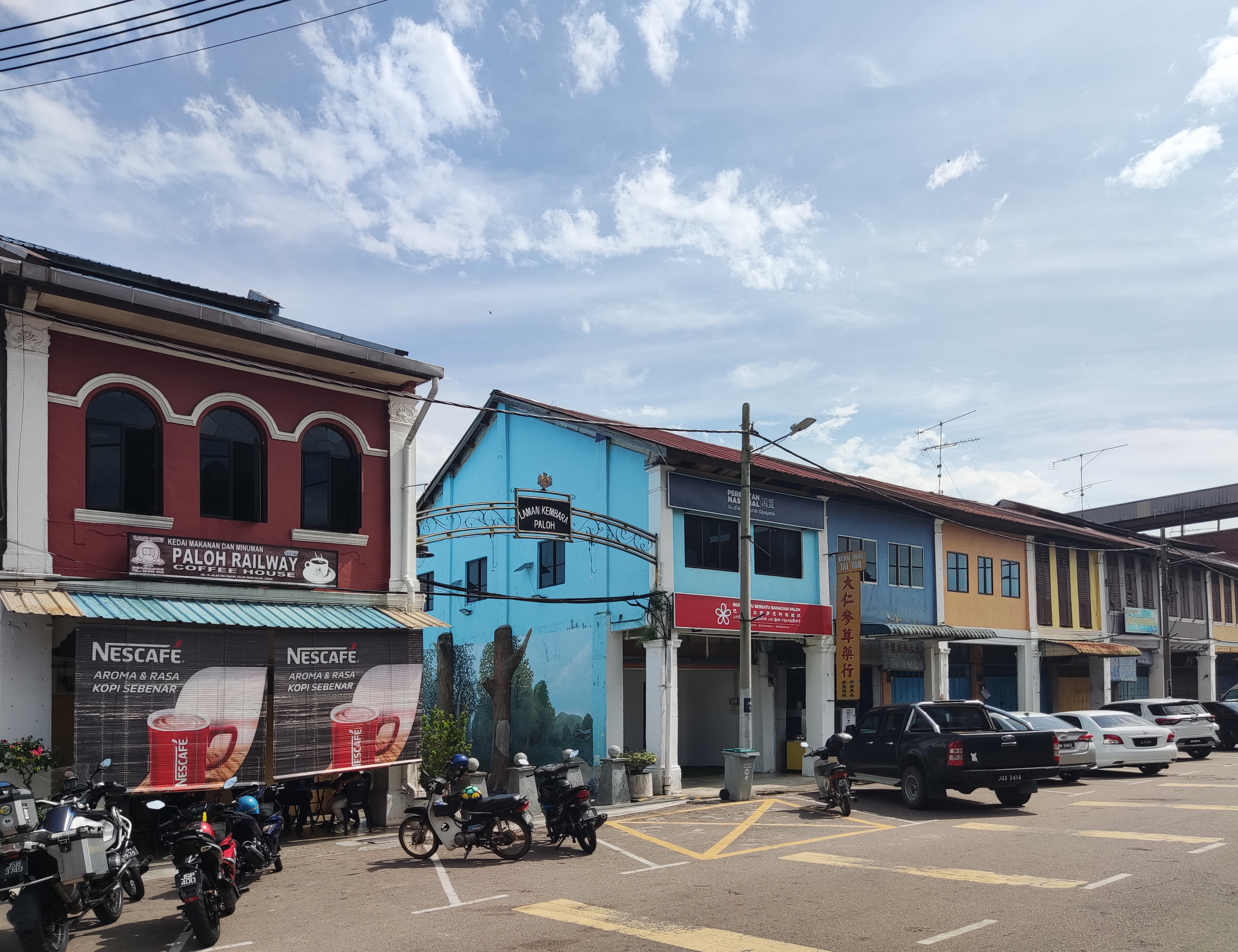
- Street of Paloh
- Country: Malaysia
- State: Johor
- District: Kluang

Paloh in Kluang District

Paloh is a mukim in Kluang District, Johor, Malaysia.

== History ==
During the Malayan Emergency (1948–1960) the town was considered a "black area" of communist terrorists and sympathizers.

== Geography ==
The mukim spans over an area of 429 km^{2}.

== Demographics ==
There are 9083 males and 7337 females living in Paloh (16,420 total). There are about 5824 houses.

As of 2020, Paloh has a population of 79,707 people.

== Economy ==
The town's main activity is the cultivation of oil palms and rubber trees.

== Education ==
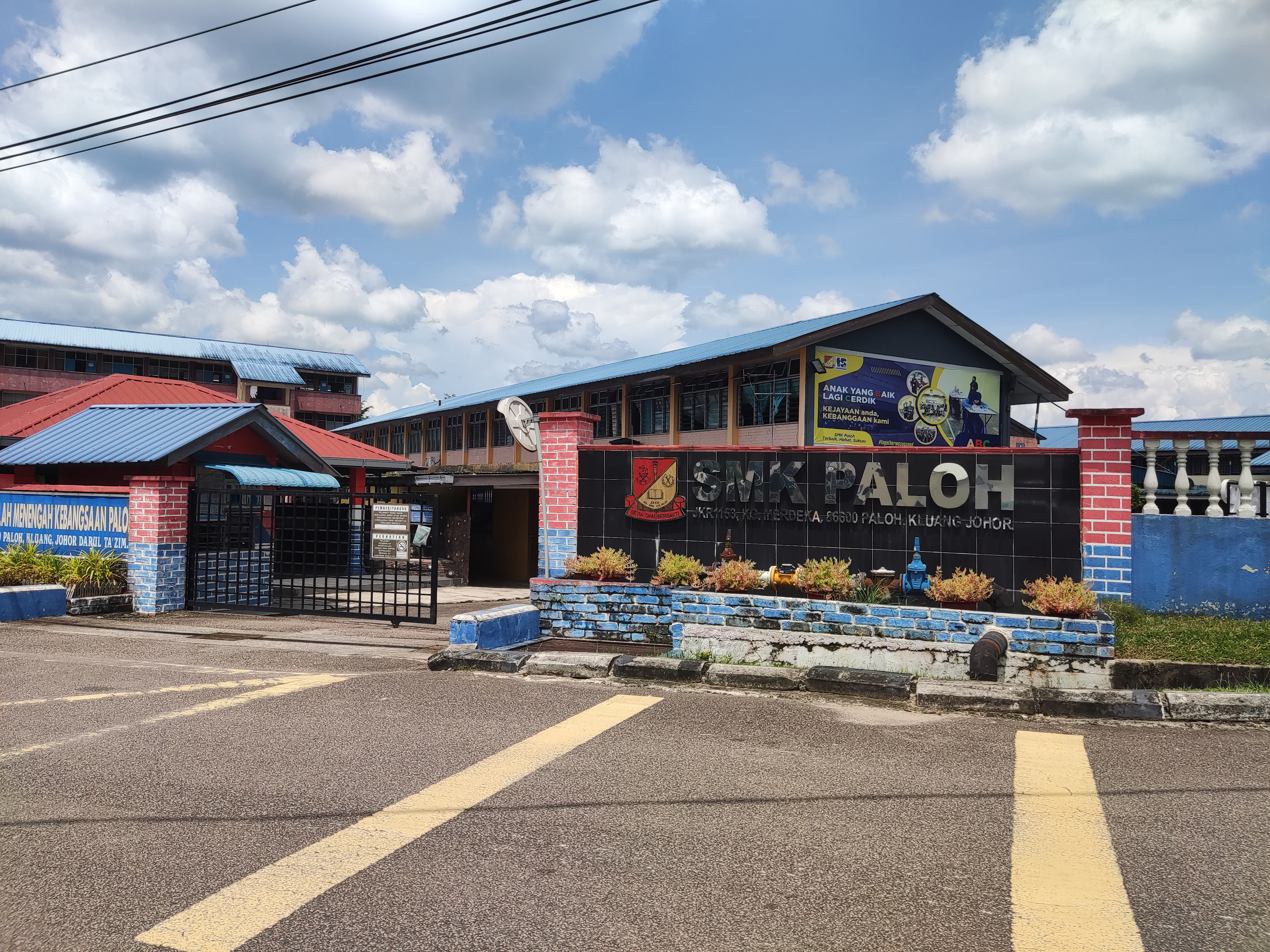
SMK Paloh

1. SMK Paloh
2. SMK Seri Kota Paloh
3. SK Bandar Paloh
4. SK Paloh 2
5. SK Bukit Paloh
6. SJK(C)Yu Ming
7. SJK(C)Paloh
8. SJK(C)Pei Chih, Bukit Paloh
9. SJK(C)Sentral Paloh
10. SK Kampong Chamek, Paloh
11. Sekolah Agama Bandar Paloh
12. Sekolah Agama Bandar Paloh 2
13. Sekolah Agama Bukit Paloh
14. SJK(T)Jalan Stesen Paloh
15. Madrasatul Islamiya Jalan Station Paloh

== Housing estates ==
1. Taman Sri Kota Paloh
2. Taman Wijaya
3. Taman Paloh
4. Taman Melati
5. Taman Murni
6. Kampung Muhibbah
7. Kampung India
8. Taman Kiara
9. Taman Seri Palma
10. Kampung Merdeka
11. Taman Indah

== Transportation ==
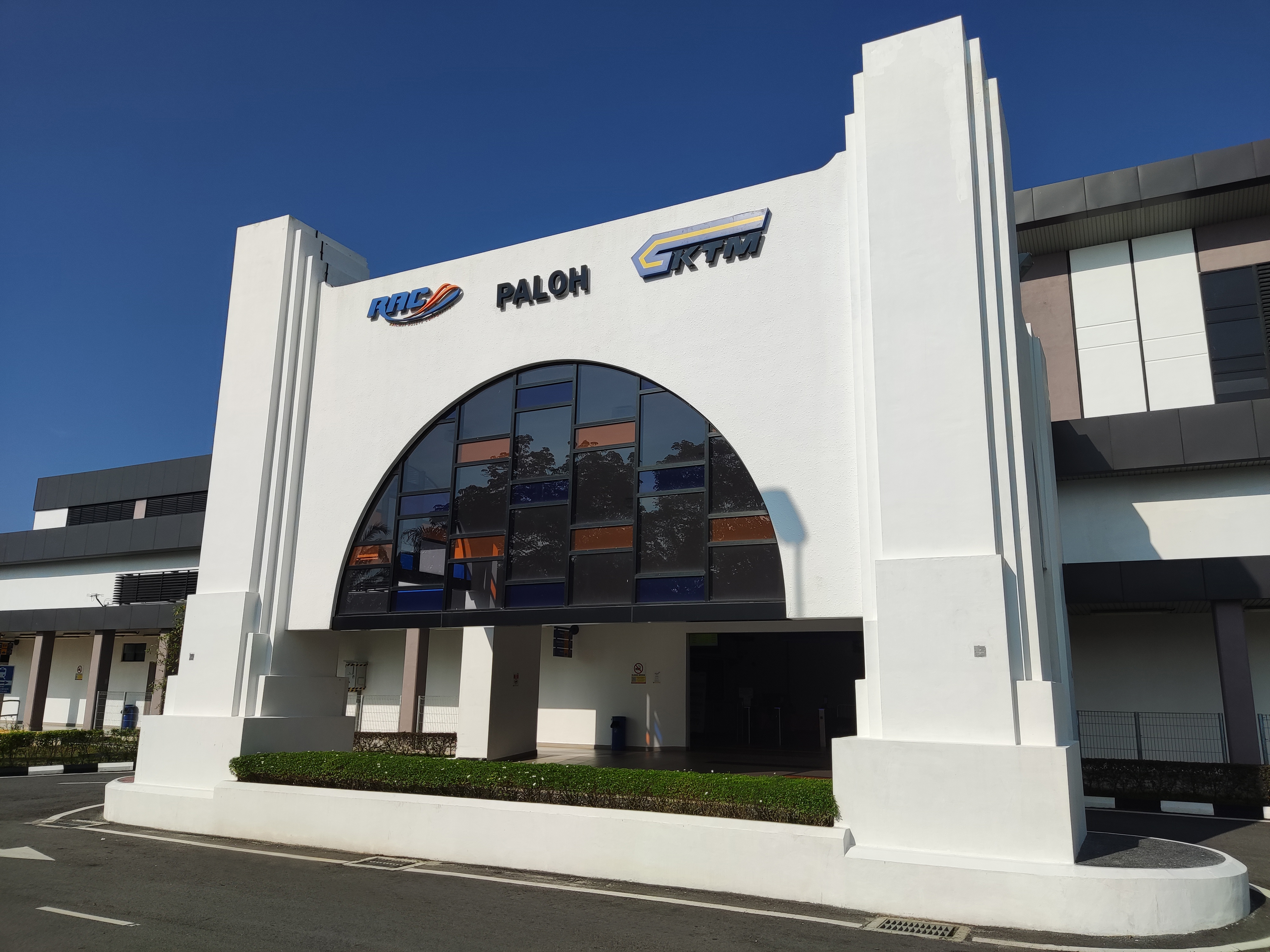
Paloh railway station

A KTM Intercity railway station is located in this town, and it is linked to Kuala Lumpur and Johor Bahru via the North South Line.
