= Chaah =

Coordinates: 2°14′N 103°02′E

Chaah 三合港 (Chinese)
- Town and Mukim
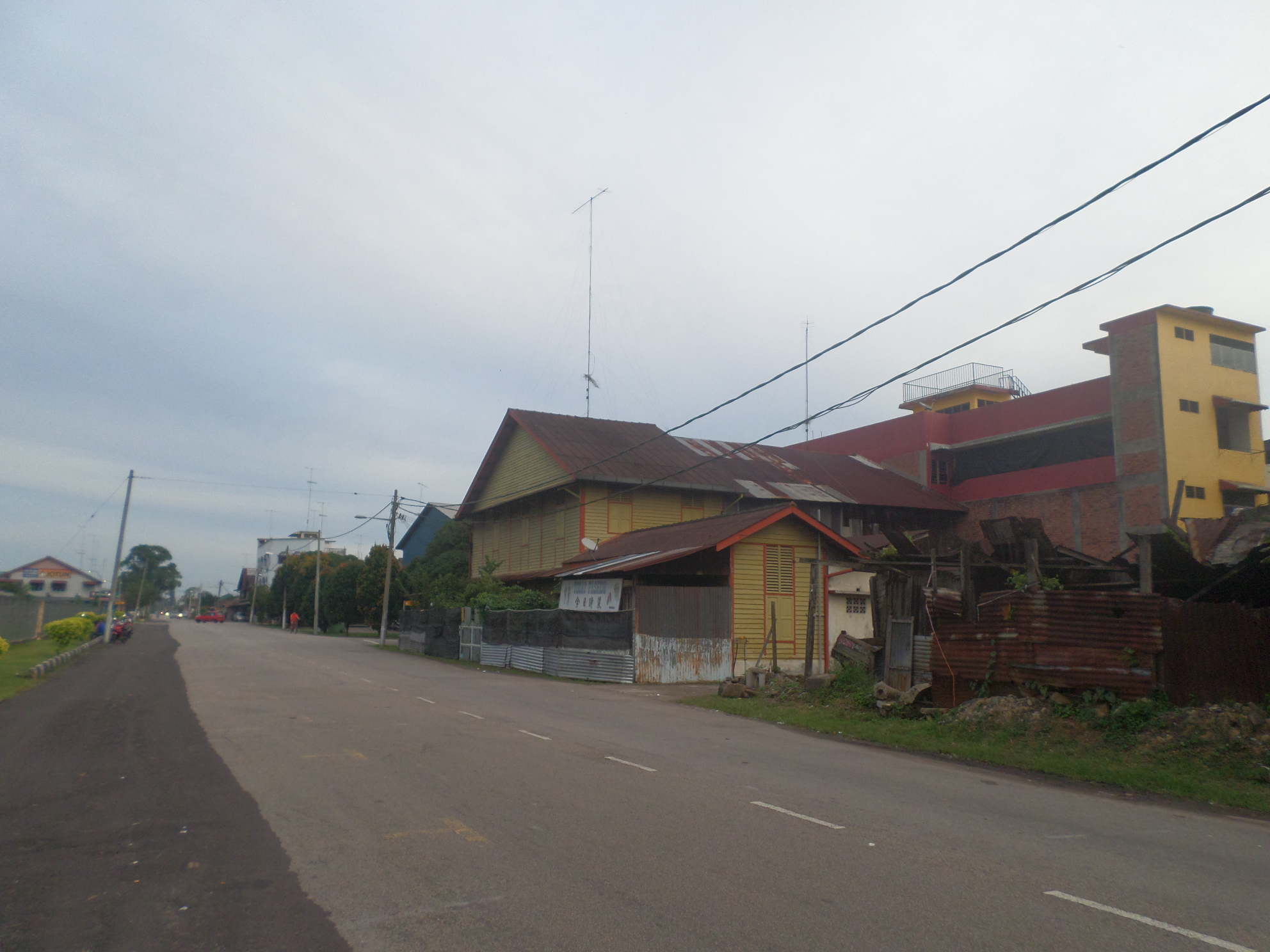
- Interactive map of Chaah
- Country: Malaysia
- State: Johor
- District: Segamat

Area
  - Total: 184 km^{2} (71 sq mi)

Population (2010)
  - Total: 15,627
  - Density: 84.9/km^{2} (220/sq mi)

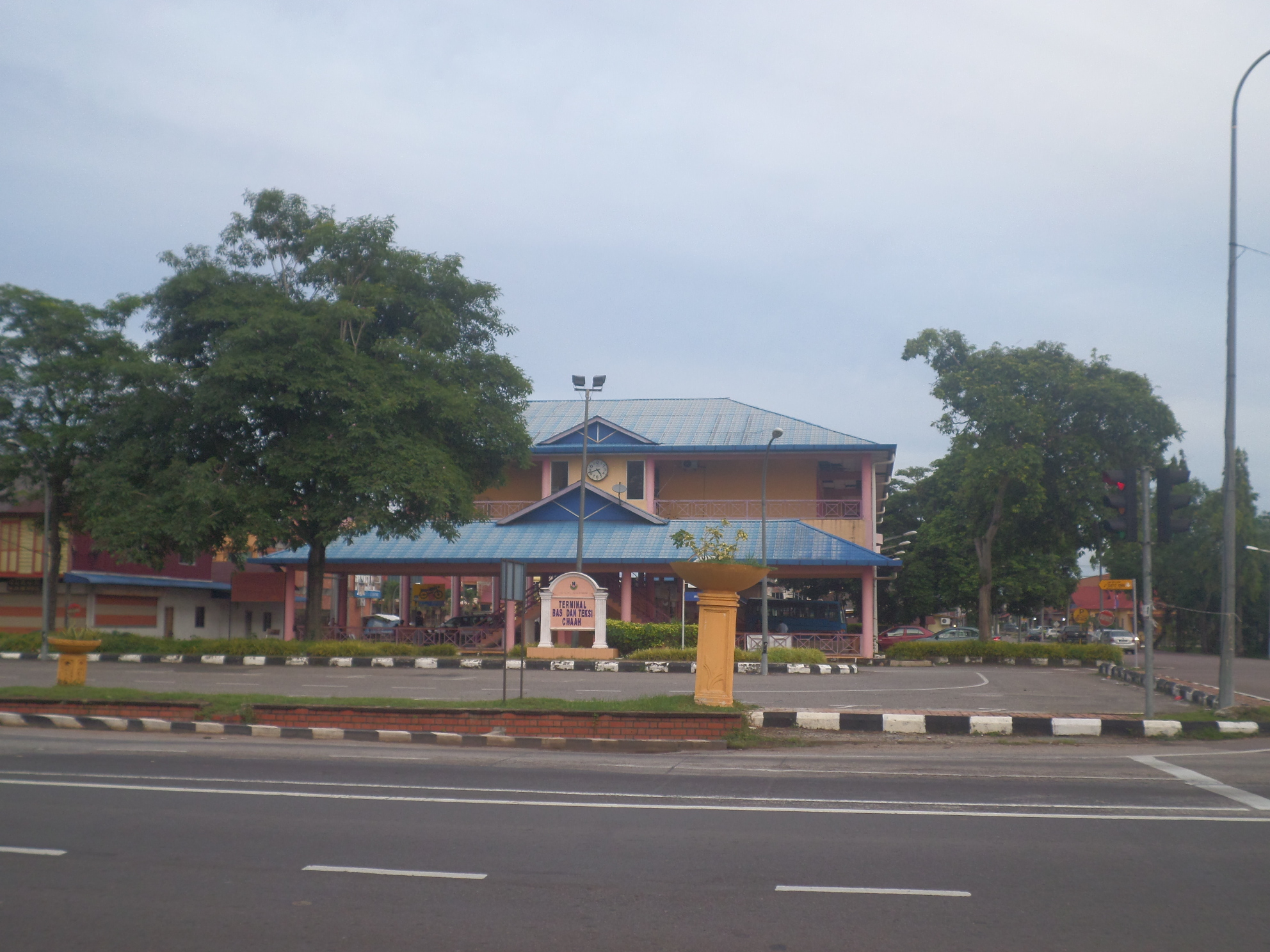
Chaah Bus and Taxi Terminal

Chaah is a town and mukim in Segamat District, Johor, Malaysia. It is the southernmost mukim in the district, but it is administered as a suburb of Labis.

Chaah consists of Kampung and Taman Chaah Town, C-Block, Kampung Baru (residents are mostly Chinese), Kampung Java (Malay Kampung), Taman Damai Jaya I & II, Taman Sri Chaah, Taman Orkid, and is surrounded by oil palm plantations. Taman Chaah Baru (new Chaah garden) is 1 to 2 kilometres (0.6 to 1.2 mi) from Chaah Town.

About 5 kilometres (3 mi) south of Chaah, there is a village named Desa Temu Jodoh. Established in the early 1970s, Desa Temu Jodoh got its name from the grand wedding ceremony among many couples of early settlers. The number of couples married during the wedding ceremony was said to be the largest at that time in Malaysia.

== Name ==
The name "Cha'ah" or "Chaah" is derived from its geographical location. Chaah is situated between mapping of three rivers. The Mandarin pronunciation of Chaah is "San He Gang" (三合港). - "San" means three - "He" means join - "Gang" means port

There are a rumours about how the name was coined.

It may be named "Chaah" because the early owner of this inner harbour was named Cha Ah Kong (谢亚光).

Further, back in the early 1960s, Chaah villagers lived along the Sungai Chaah (River Chaah). The main transportation was Sampan (small boat). Sampan is used for travelling to other towns, namely Batu Pahat which is the nearest one.

== Geography ==
Chaah in Segamat District

The mukim has a total area of 184 km^{2}.

== Demographics ==
As of 2010, Chaah has a total population of 2,549 people. The following is based on Department of Statistics Malaysia 2010 census.

Ethnic groups in Chaah, 2010
Ethnicity	Population	Percentage
Bumiputera, Malay	563	22.08%
Chinese	1,629	63.91%
Indian	282	11.06%
Other Bumiputera	18	0.70%
Others	10	0.40%
Non-Malaysian	47	1.85%

There is a big Indian community in Chaah (about 4000 families). They all originate from the estates. The Indians are well grown people at Chaah. Many of them have own houses and lands, some others doing own business such as farming (bela lembu), contractors and so on. Tamils or Indians mainly live in Taman Muhibbah, Taman Mesra, Taman Mewa, Taman Indah, Taman Damai Jaya and Taman Nesa.

== Education ==
=== Primary school ===
1. Sekolah Kebangsaan Seri Bali
2. Sekolah Kebangsaan Desa Temu Jodoh
3. Sekolah Jenis Kebangsaan (Tamil) Cantuman Chaah
4. Sekolah Jenis Kebangsaan (Cina) Cha'Ah

=== Secondary school ===
1. Sekolah Menengah Kebangsaan Chaah
2. Sekolah Menengah Kebangsaan Seri Bali

== See also ==
- Bekok
- Segamat
- Labis
- Yong Peng
