= Labis =

- Town
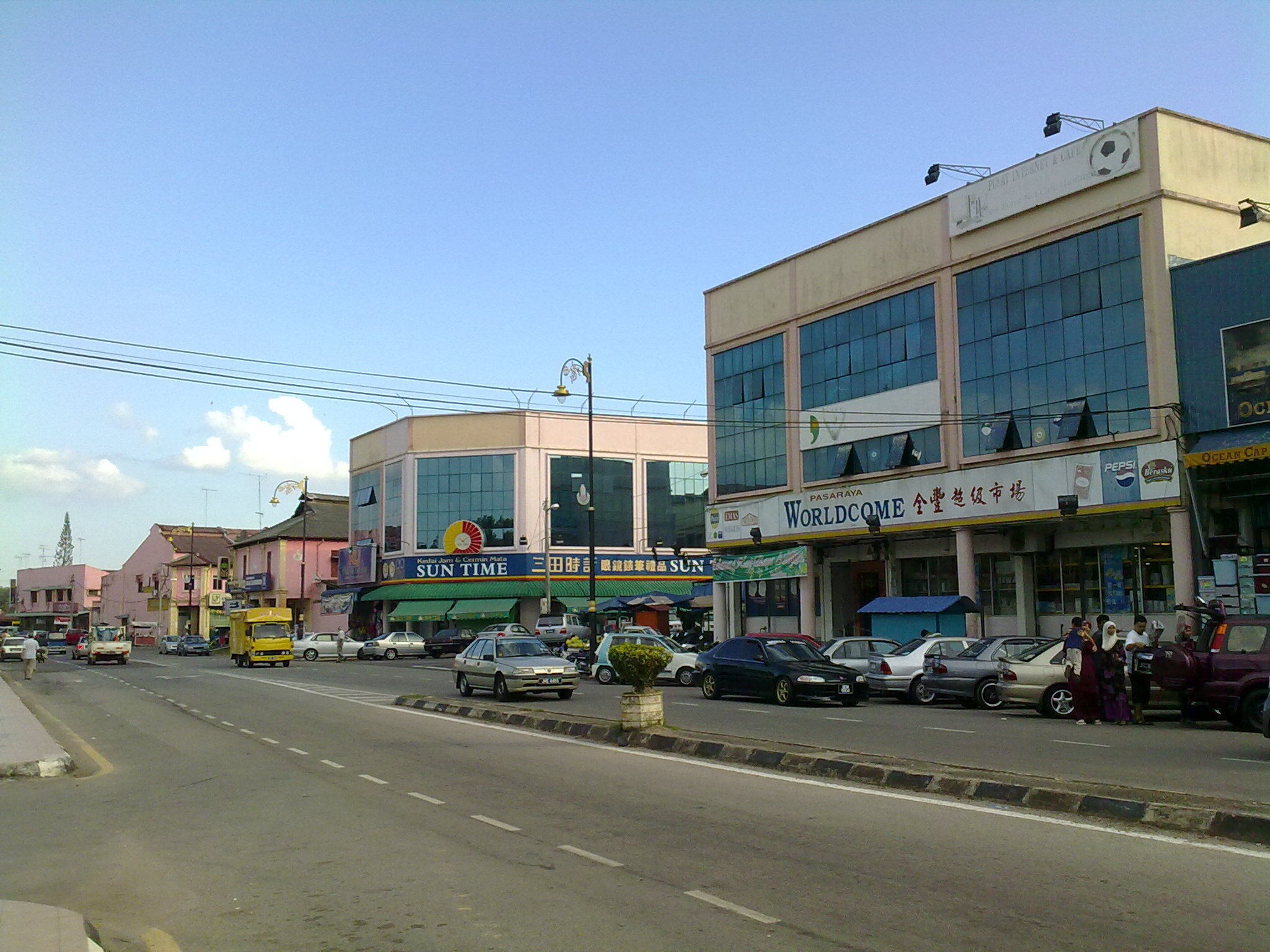

- Coat of arms
- Motto(s): Berkhidmat untuk Rakyat "Serve the People" (motto of Labis District Council)
- Interactive map of Labis
- Location within Johor Location within Malaysia
- Coordinates: 2°22′55″N 103°01′12″E
- Country: Malaysia
- State: Johor
- District: Segamat

Government
  - Type: Local government
  - Body: Labis District Council
  - President: Mohd Fairul Surian (since 1 July 2025)

Area
  - Total: 422 km^{2} (163 sq mi)

Population (2010)
  - Total: 36,053
  - Density: 85.4/km^{2} (221/sq mi)
- Website: mdlabis.gov.my

Labis District Council Majlis Daerah Labis
- Emblem

Type
- Type: Local authority of Labis

History
- Founded: 1 January 1977
- Preceded by: Segamat South District Council

Leadership
- President: Mohd Fairul Surian (since 1 July 2025)
- Secretary: Muhamad Khairul Faiz Mashod

Structure
- Seats: 24
- Political groups: Councillors: BN (24): UMNO (13); MCA (8); MIC (3)
- Length of term: 1 April 2024–31 December 2025

Motto
- Berkhidmat untuk Rakyat (Serve the People)

Meeting place
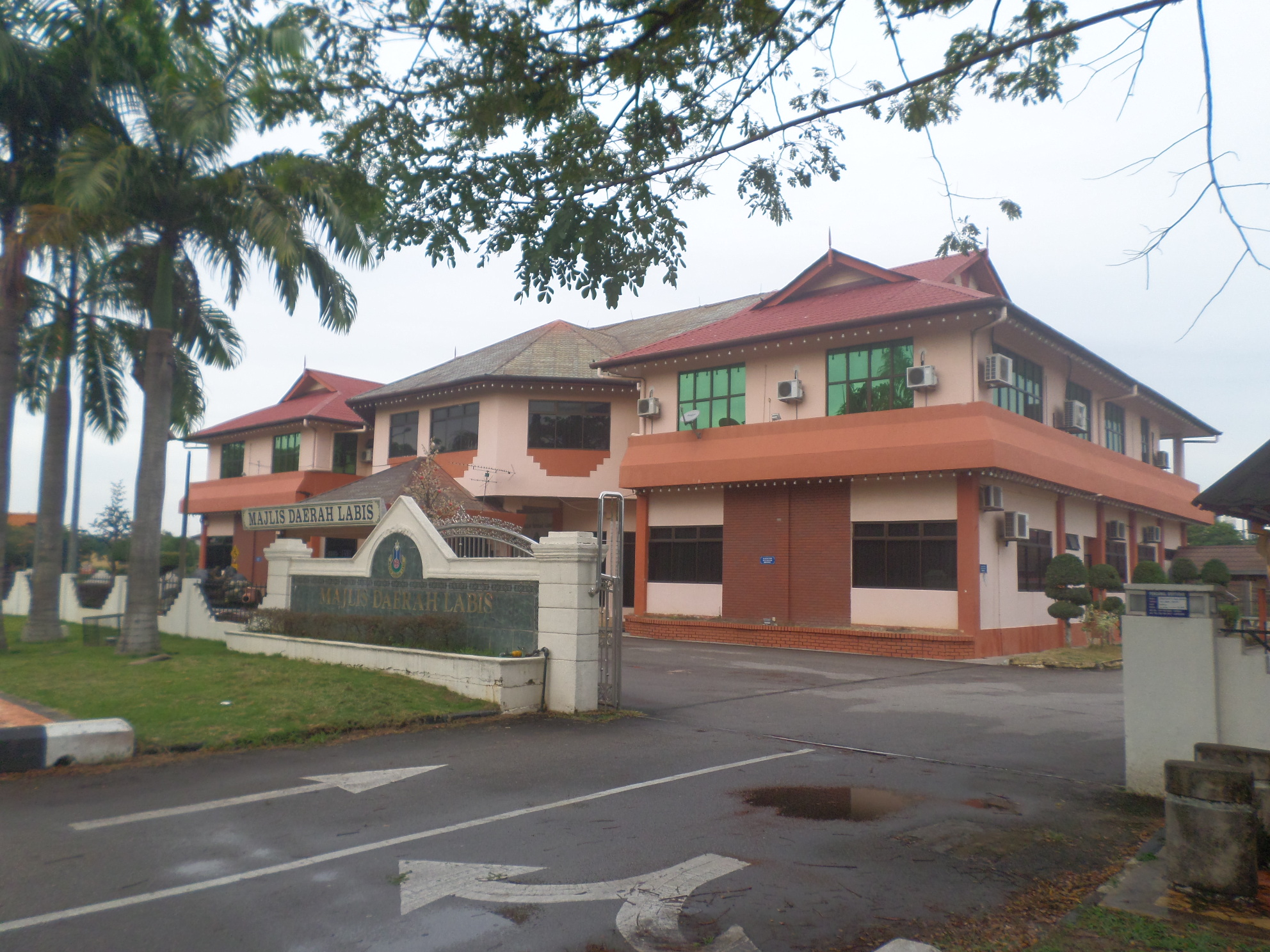
- Majlis Daerah Labis 85300 Labis, Segamat, Johor Darul Ta'zim

Website
- www.mdlabis.gov.my

Labis is a town and a mukim (township) in Segamat District in northern Johor, Malaysia. A main trunk road that runs north-south Peninsular Malaysia passes through it, as well as the KTM railway line that connects it with the state's capital in the south, Johor Bahru.

== History ==
Labis started as a small village known as Kampung Paya Merah. The village got its name from a type of river grass which became the favorite food for river terrapins. In early 20th century, British officers came to the villages to survey for new areas to be developed in Segamat district.

The British officers were surprised to see the river terrapins since they had not seen those animals before. They asked the villagers the name of those animals and the villagers answered, "Labi-labi, tuan," ("River terrapins, sir"). Because they didn't know the name of those animals, the British officers referred to them as labis in the plural form. Therefore, the British officers decided to name the settlement Labis.

Another theory is that in the 17th century, a member of the Malaccan royal family was travelling through the area. He saw something that intrigued him. He called out to his advisors to tell him what it was, he went "Habis? Habis?" thus accidentally blurting out the name Labis.

Malays here planted paddy field and poultry as the main source of food, living in villages such as Kampung Paya Merah, Kampung Tenang and Kampung Sungai Gatom. During the British era, there was a rubber estate known as North Labis Estate was established and the British brought Indian labor as the workforce. During the communist insurgency around 1948, the government brought in Chinese ethnic to the town.

During the Konfrontasi, Labis was the scene of a landing by Indonesian paratroopers.

== Geography ==
Labis in Segamat District

Map of Labis within Johor

Labis is situated in the north of Johor, bordering the Segamat sub-district and the state of Pahang to the north, the mukim of Bekok to the east, the mukim of Pogoh to the west and the mukim of Cha’ah to the south.

Labis covers an area of 422 km^{2}, making it the second largest mukim in Johor after Bekok.

Labis town, along with the adjacent commune of Bekok and Cha’ah, are granted autonomy from Segamat and administered by the Labis District Council (Majlis Daerah Labis).

There is a waterfall known as Taka Melor famous among locals situated 15 km from the town near Pekan Air Panas and Kampung Tenang.

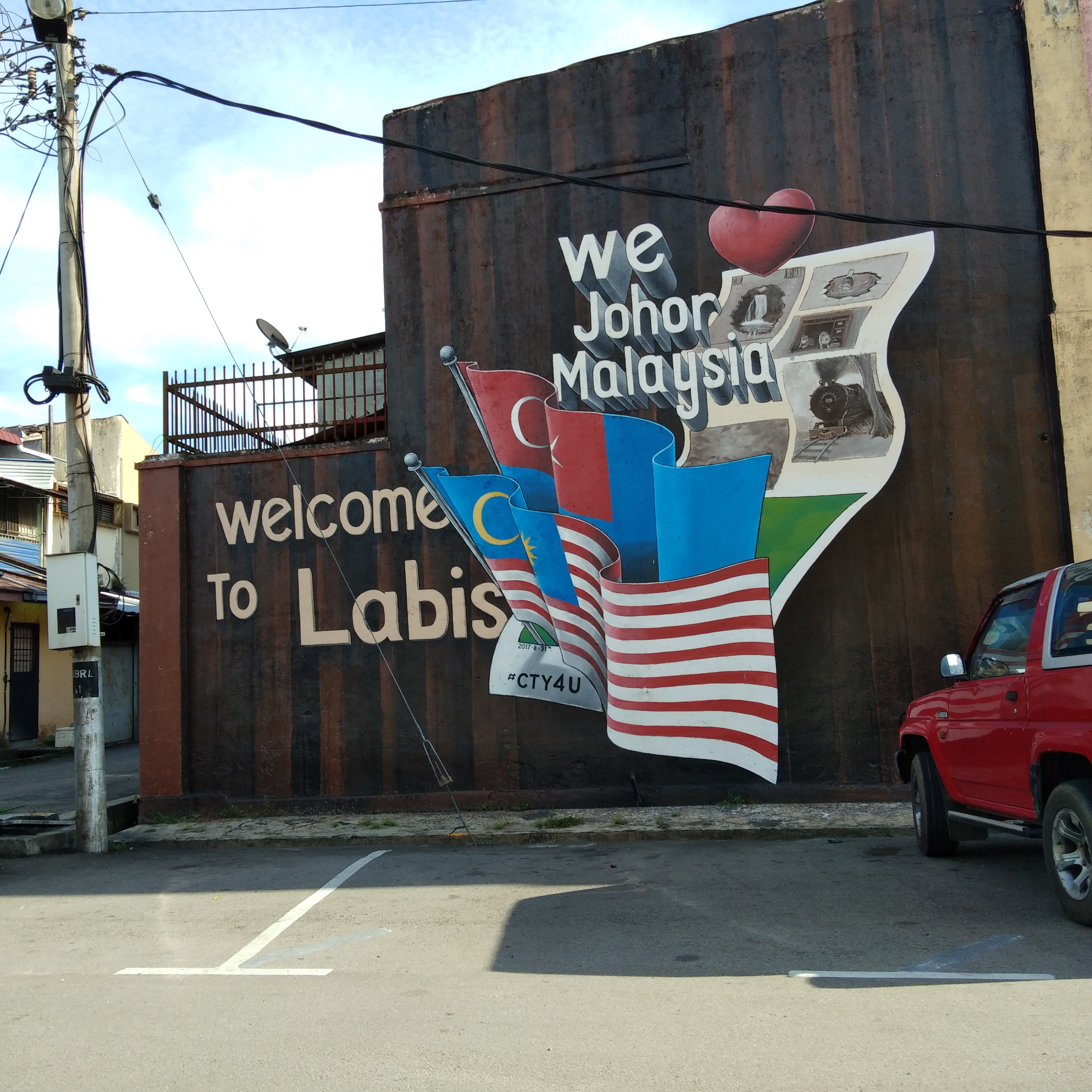
Labis also has its own street art same like in Penang

== Economy ==
Labis is an agricultural town whose main export is rubber and is one of the main rubber producer in Johor.

== Government and politics ==
Labis District Council (Malay: Majlis Daerah Labis) is the local government of Labis and other towns of South Segamat District. It was formed on 1 January 1977 as the Segamat South District Council (Malay: Majlis Daerah Segamat Selatan) through the merger of the five local councils (Malay: Majlis Tempatan) of Labis, Chaah, Bekok, Ayer Panas and Sungai Karas and got its present name on 1 January 2001.

=== Departments ===
- Management Services (Khidmat Pengurusan)
- Finance (Kewangan)
- Valuation & Property Management (Penilaian Dan Pengurusan Harta)
- Engineering (Kejuruteraan)
- Environmental Health (Kesihatan Persekitaran)
- Urban Planning & Landscape (Perancangan Bandar Dan Landskap)
- Licensing & Enforcement (Pelesenan Dan Penguatkuasaan)

=== Units ===
- Internal Audit (Audit Dalam)
- Law (Undang-undang)
- One Stop Centre (Pusat Sehenti)

=== Administration areas (zones) ===
As of 2025, Labis is divided into 24 zones represented by 24 councillors to act as mediators between residents and the district council. The councillors for the 1 April 2024 to 31 December 2025 session are as below:

Zone	Councillor	Political affiliation
Labis 1	Low Wei June	MCA
Labis 2	Mohd Faiz Mohamad	UMNO
Labis 3	Maygiala Pathu	MIC
Labis 4	Lee Wee Jie	MCA
Labis 5	How Pee Ling	MCA
Labis 6	Mohd Azahar Ibrahim	UMNO
Labis 7	Siti Norlaila Sedek	UMNO
Labis 8	Harun Saleh	UMNO
Labis 9	Ishak Kadirun	UMNO
Labis 10	Mohd Jamil Bahari	UMNO
Chaah 1	Sukaimi Boyamin	UMNO
Chaah 2	Chin Cen Woon	MCA
Chaah 3	Norazila Jamingin	UMNO
Chaah 4	Tan Soon Aik	MCA
Chaah 5	Rajan Subramanian	MIC
Chaah 6	Yow Wei Joon	MCA
Bekok 1	Azmi Sulaiman	UMNO
Bekok 2	Yee Chong Haw	MCA
Bekok 3	Zurinawati Ahmad	UMNO
Bekok 4	Thanmoli Peariasamy	MIC
Tenang Stesen 1	Mohammad Khakem Senan	UMNO
Tenang Stesen 2	Abd Rahman Mohktar	UMNO
Sungai Karas	Teh Ah Lim	MCA
Air Panas	Omar Talib	UMNO

== Education ==
=== Primary schools ===
School Code	School name	Postcode	Coordinates
JBA7024	Sekolah Kebangsaan Labis	85300	2.3810°N 103.0218°E
JBA7025	Sekolah Kebangsaan Pekan Air Panas	85300	2.4739°N 103.0564°E
JBA7026	Sekolah Kebangsaan Kampong Tenang	85300	2.4754°N 103.0682°E
JBA7027	Sekolah Kebangsaan Sawah Bahru	85300	2.4716°N 103.0191°E
JBA7028	Sekolah Kebangsaan Lktp Tenang	85300	2.4425°N 103.0405°E
JBA7031	Sekolah Kebangsaan (Felda) Chemplak	85300	2.3791°N 102.9457°E
JBA7035	Sekolah Kebangsaan (Felda) Redong	85300	2.5038°N 103.0159°E
JBA7040	Sekolah Kebangsaan Lktp Maokil 1	85300	2.2997°N 102.9675°E
JBA7042	Sekolah Kebangsaan Segamat Kecil	85300	2.5450°N 103.0039°E
JBA7046	Sekolah Kebangsaan Lktp Maokil 2	85300	2.2908°N 102.9687°E
JBB7046	Sekolah Kebangsaan Sri Labis	85300	2.3818°N 103.0174°E
JBC7012	Sekolah Jenis Kebangsaan (Cina) Karas	85300	2.3555°N 103.0370°E
JBC7014	Sekolah Jenis Kebangsaan (Cina) Labis	85300	2.3886°N 103.0185°E
JBC7018	Sekolah Jenis Kebangsaan (Cina) Tenang	85300	2.4705°N 103.0529°E
JBD7061	Sekolah Jenis Kebangsaan (Tamil) Labis	85300	2.3825°N 103.0176°E

=== Secondary schools ===
School Code	School name	Postcode	Coordinates
JEA5041	Sekolah Menengah Kebangsaan Felcra Bukit Kepong	85300	2.3830°N 102.9171°E
JEA7037	Sekolah Menengah Kebangsaan (Lktp) Maokil	85300	2.2925°N 102.9663°E
JEA7039	Sekolah Menengah Kebangsaan Kamarul Ariffin	85300	2.3997°N 103.0309°E
JEB7032	Sekolah Menengah Kebangsaan Labis	85300	2.3752°N 103.0145°E
JEE7033	Sekolah Menengah Kebangsaan Munshi Ibrahim	85300	2.3942°N 103.0169°E

== Demographics ==
As of 2010, Labis has a total population of 36,053 people. It has a large Chinese community.

== Transportation ==
=== Public transportation ===
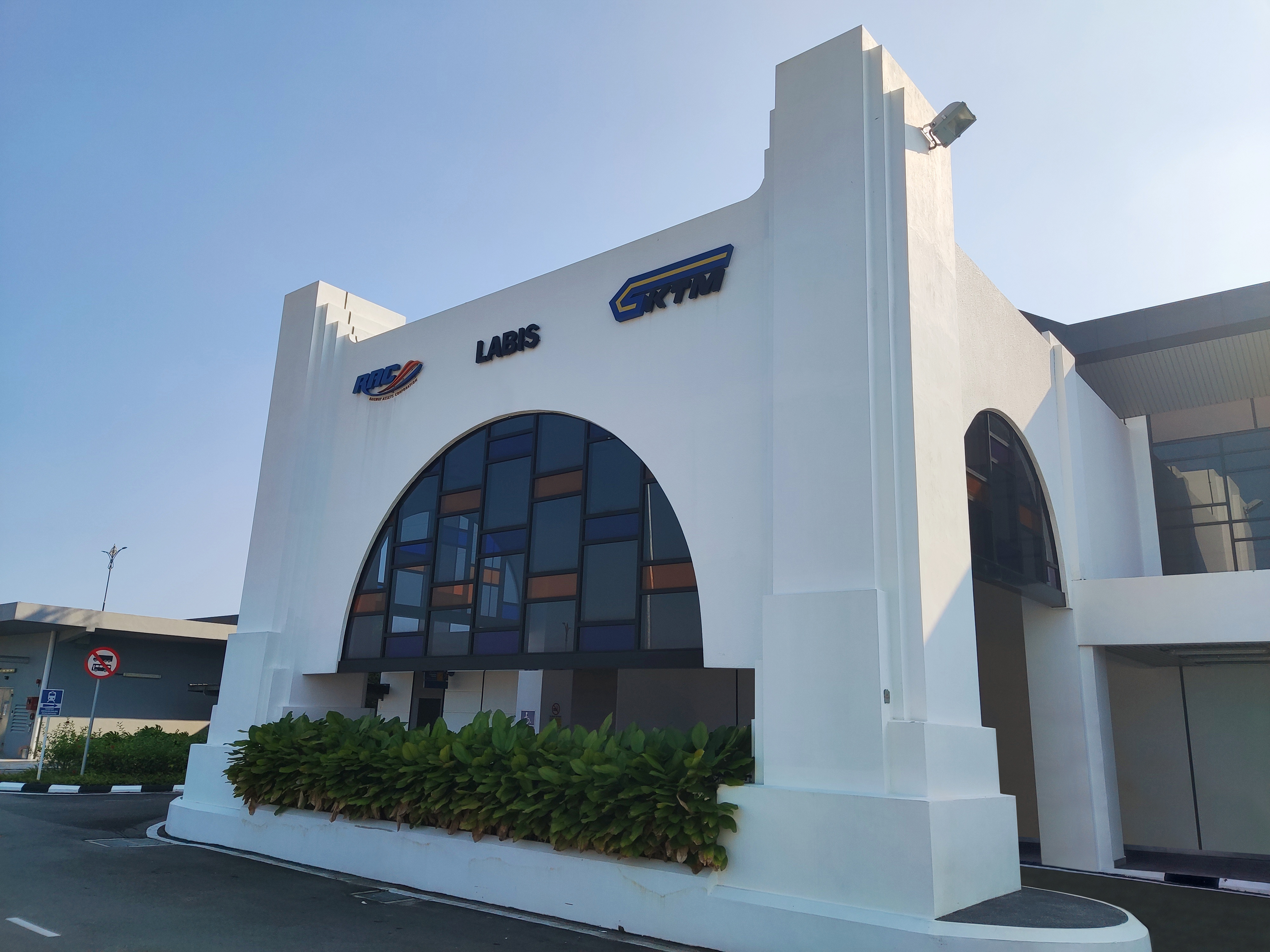
Labis Railway Station

The town is accessible from Labis railway station.

=== Car ===
National Highway Federal Route 1.

== See also ==
- Pekan Air Panas
