= Segamat District =

District in Johor, Malaysia

- District of Johor
- Daerah Segamat
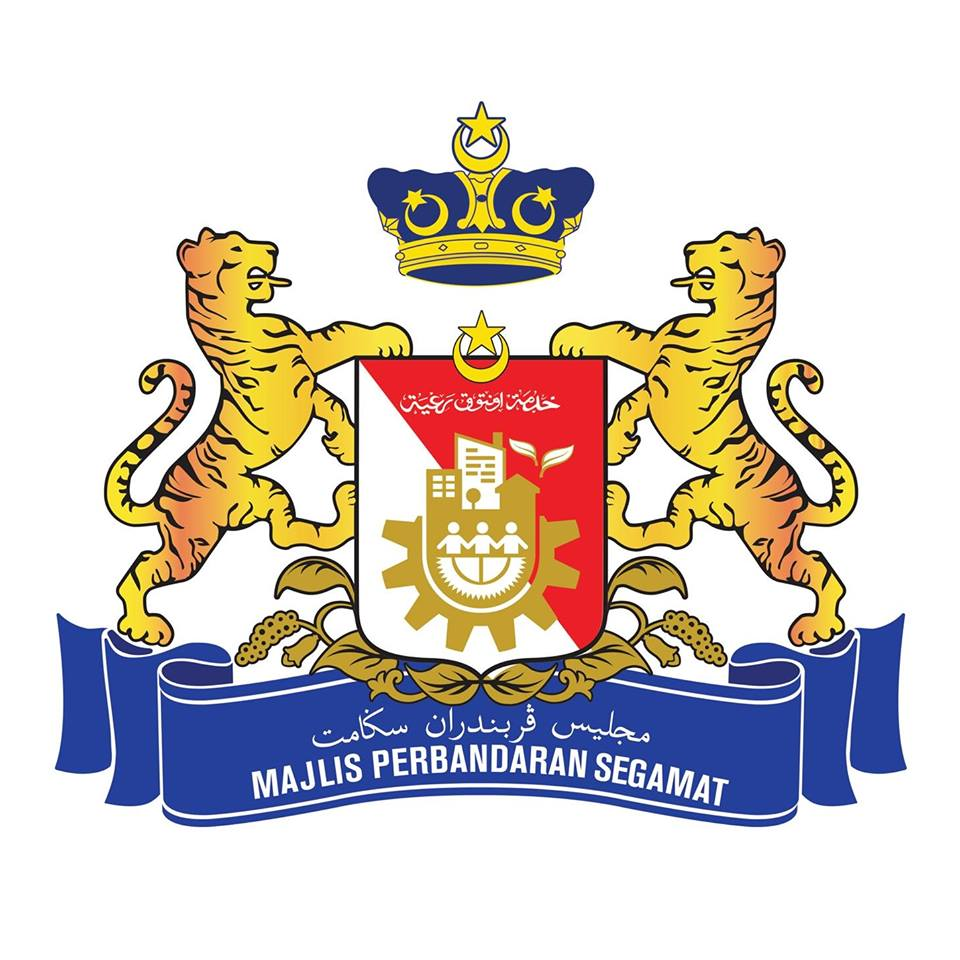
- Flag Coat of arms

- Location of Segamat District in Johor
- Interactive map of Segamat District
- Location of Segamat District in Malaysia
- Coordinates: 2°30′N 102°55′E
- Country: Malaysia
- State: Johor
- Seat: Segamat
- Local area government(s): Segamat Municipal Council (North); Labis District Council (South)

Government
  - District officer: Haji Nasri Bin Md Ali

Area
  - Total: 2,807.29 km^{2} (1,083.90 sq mi)

Population (2010)
  - Total: 179,342
  - Density: 63.8844/km^{2} (165.460/sq mi)
- Time zone: UTC+8 (MST)
  - Summer (DST): UTC+8 (Not observed)
- Postcode: 85xxx 865xx (Bekok); 734xx (Gemas Baru, Batu Anam*)
- Calling code: +6-07 +6-06 (Batu Anam*)
- Vehicle registration plates: J (*Felda Palong Timur, a rural Felda settlement in Batu Anam)

The Segamat District (Malay: Daerah Segamat) or simply Segamat is a district in the Malaysian state of Johor. Segamat is also the name of the district's primary town. Segamat district is one of the three landlocked districts in Johor, the other being Kluang and Kulai.

== Etymology ==
It is believed that 'Segamat' is derived from the Malay phrase 'segar amat', which literally translates as 'very refreshing'. According to the local folklore, the phrase was uttered by Bendahara Tepok, the last Bendahara (Prime Minister) of the Sultanate of Malacca upon bathing and drinking the water from the Segamat River.

== Geography ==
The district is located in the northernmost part of Johor. It borders the state of Negeri Sembilan (Tampin and Jempol districts) to the northwest, the state of Pahang (Bera and Rompin districts) to the northeast, the district of Mersing to the east, the district of Kluang to the southeast, the district of Batu Pahat to the southwest and the districts of Muar and Tangkak to the west.

Segamat is the primary town in the district. Other towns, as well as villages and residential areas include:

- Segamat Baru
- Bukit Siput
- Bandar Putra (IOI)
- Taman Yayasan
- Batu Anam
- Pogoh
- Gemas Baharu
- Kampung Tengah
- Bandar Utama
- Jementah
- Buloh Kasap
- Labis
- Tenang Stesen
- Sungai Karas

There are three main rivers which flow through the district, namely the Batu Pahat River (as Simpang Kiri River), Endau River and Muar River. Other rivers include Bekok River, Chodan River, Kenawar or Genuang River, Batang Lesong River, Bongor River, Emas River, Gemas River, Jasin River, Jementah River, Labis River, Legeh River, Mempedak River, Merlimau River, Mutan River, Palong River, Paya Mengkuang River, Penarah River, Rengit River, Segamat River, Kapeh River, Selai River, Semerong River, Senarut Hilir River, Spang Loi River and Tatat River.

== Administrative divisions ==

The district is divided into 11 subdistricts or mukims. Each mukim is administered by a headman or penghulu.

- Sungai Segamat
- Gemereh
- Bekok
- Jabi
- Sermin
- Buloh Kasap
- Jementah
- Pogoh
- Labis
- Chaah
- Gemas

Mukim Sungai Segamat is the most populous mukim in Segamat District with a population of 48,512 people. The highest population density is in Mukim Gemereh, followed by Mukim Sungai Segamat with over 200+ residents per square km. The lowest population density is in Mukim Bekok with about 50 residents per square km.

== Government ==
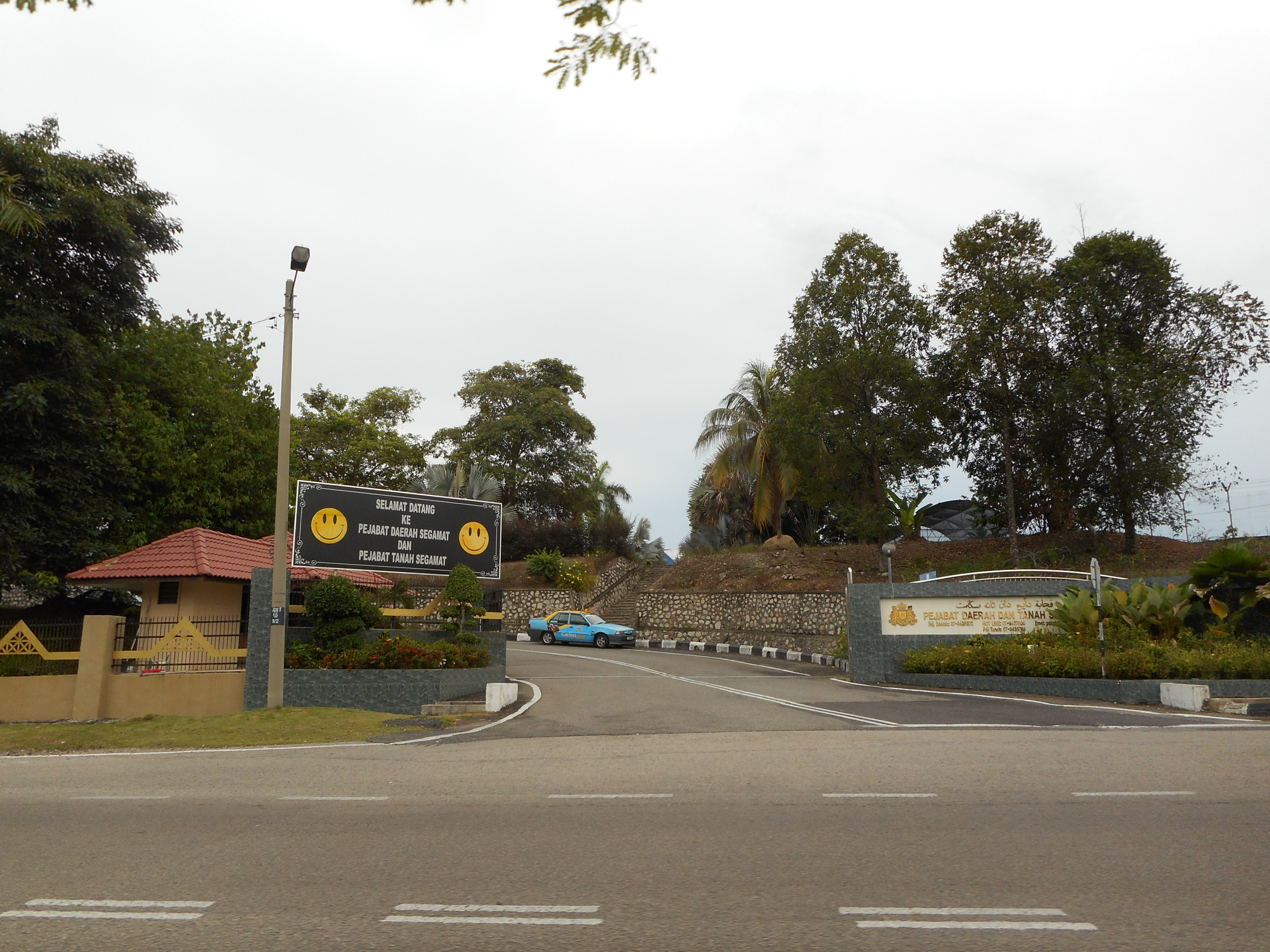
Segamat District and Land Office

The Segamat district is divided by two municipal administratives namely Segamat Municipal Council based at Segamat Town and Labis District Council seated at Labis Town.

Segamat Municipal Council administers the northwestern half of the district covering mukim Buloh Kasap, Gemas, Gemereh, Jabi, Jementah, Pagoh, Sermin and Sungai Segamat with a total administrative area of 129 km^{2} (50 sq mi).

Labis District Council administers the southwestern half of the district covering mukim Bekok, Chaah and Labis, with a total administrative area of 122 km^{2} (47 sq mi).

== Demographics ==
Historical population
Year	Pop.	±%
1991	177,561	—
2000	177,916	+0.2%
2010	182,985	+2.8%
2020	197,762	+8.1%

The annual population growth of Segamat District between 2010 and 2015 was 0.66%.

== Federal Parliament and State Assembly Seats ==
List of Segamat district representatives in the Federal Parliament (Dewan Rakyat)

Parliament	Seat Name	Member of Parliament	Party
P140	Segamat	Yuneswaran Ramaraj	Pakatan Harapan (PKR)
P141	Sekijang	Zaliha Mustafa	Pakatan Harapan (PKR)
P142	Labis	Pang Hock Liong	Pakatan Harapan (DAP)

List of Segamat district representatives in the State Legislative Assembly (Dewan Undangan Negeri (DUN))

Parliament	State	Seat Name	State Assemblyman	Party
P140	N01	Buloh Kasap	Zahari Kasip	Barisan Nasional (UMNO)
P140	N02	Jementah	See Ann Giap	Barisan Nasional (MCA)
P141	N03	Pemanis	Anuar Abd Manap	Barisan Nasional (UMNO)
P141	N04	Kemelah	Raven Kumar Krishnasamy	Barisan Nasional (MIC)
P142	N05	Tenang	Mohd Azahar Ibrahim	Barisan Nasional (UMNO)
P142	N06	Bekok	Tan Chong	Barisan Nasional (MCA)

== Economy ==
The main economy activities in the district are agriculture, agritourism, ecotourism and light manufacturing. Main agriculture produces are palm oil and rubber.

== Education ==
=== Tertiary education ===
The district is home to two main tertiary institutions: the Johor branch of the Universiti Teknologi MARA (UiTM) located about 13 kilometers from the town center; and the Johor campus of the Tunku Abdul Rahman University of Management and Technology (TAR UMT), formerly known as TAR UC and KTAR, located 14 kilometers from the town center.

Segamat also has two community colleges in Bandar Putra IOI, about 7 kilometers from the town center, and Batu Anam, about 16 kilometers from the town center.

=== Primary and secondary education ===
As of November 2025, there are about 85 primary schools and 26 secondary schools under the administration of Segamat District Education Office.

Some of the notable primary schools include SK Kampong Jawa, SK Bukit Hampar, SK Bandar Putra, and SK Canossian Convent. As for the secondary schools, some notable mentions include SMK Dato' Bentara Dalam, SMK Agama Segamat, SMK Seri Kenangan Batu Anam, SMK Bekok, Sekolah Menengah Seg Hwa, Segamat High School, and SMK Canossian Convent.

A fully residential school, SM Sains Segamat was opened in 2024. A MARA Junior Science College (MRSM) was planned to be built under the Eleventh Malaysia Plan (RMK-11) in the DUN Kemelah area.

== Places of interest ==
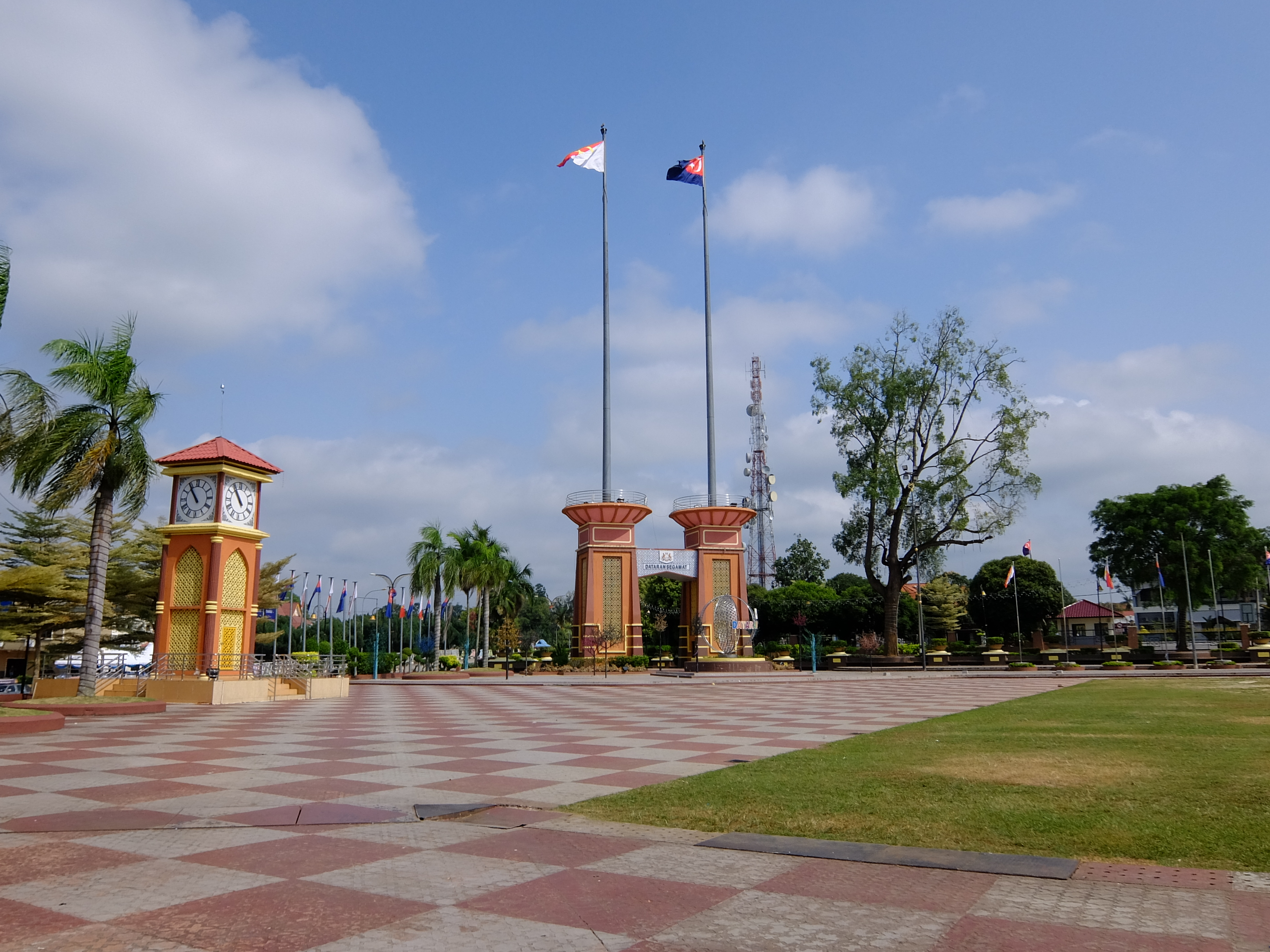
Segamat Square

- Segamat Square (Malay: Dataran Segamat) – The square was constructed in 1996 as the main venue for Johor's state-level celebration of the Malaysian National Day. In 2005, when Segamat was once again chosen as the state-level host, the area was renovated. It also houses the clock tower and a durian replica that serves as a landmark of Segamat. However, in recent years, the replica has been removed.

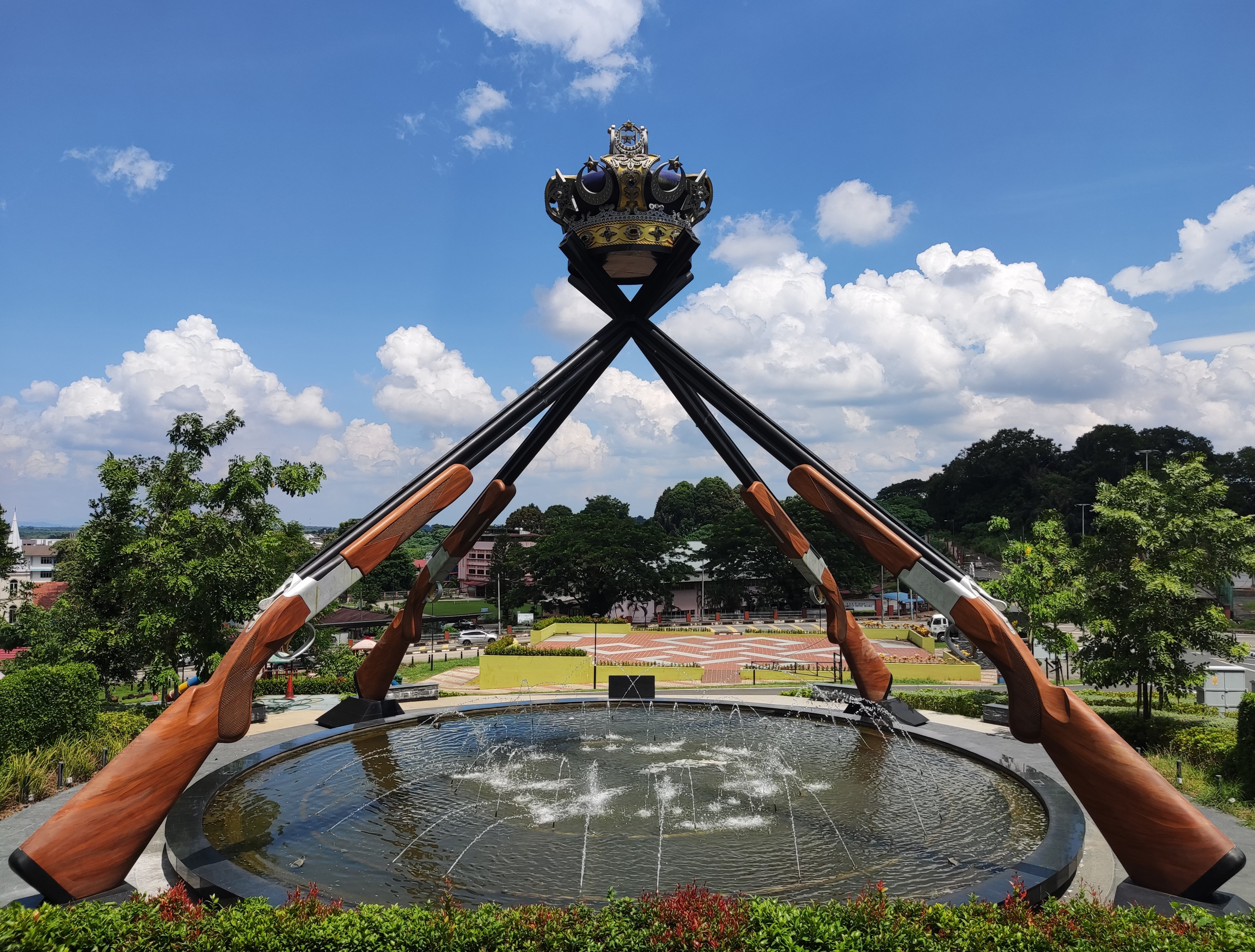
Johor Crown Monument at the Rock Garden

- Rock Garden (Taman Bunga Batu Hampar) – The Rock Garden is the main recreational park in Segamat. It also houses the official residence of the District Officer of Segamat and the Shooting Box (Istana Hinggap), Johor royal retreat.
- (Old) Iron Railway Bridge (Jambatan Keretapi Besi (Lama)) – Built in the early 20th century, the bridge was inaugurated together with the Johor State Railways (JSR) service in 1909. Due to the construction of the Gemas-Johor Bahru electrification and double tracking project (EDTP), the bridge is no longer in use, allowing it to be upgraded and refurbished into a tourist spot.
- Bendahara Tepok Tomb (Makam Bendahara Tepok) – The tomb of the final Bendahara of Sultanate of Malacca located at Kampung Lubok Batu, about 2 km from Segamat town center via Federal Route 23.
- Buloh Kasap Bridge (Jambatan Buloh Kasap) – Opened in 1938, it is also known as the Broken Bridge (Jambatan Putus) after parts of its span were destroyed by the Allied soldiers during World War II to stop the Japanese soldiers from moving forward to Singapore.
- Sungai Bantang Forest Eco Park (Taman Eko Rimba Sungai Bantang) – Located almost 63 kilometers from the town center, it lies within the Labis Reserved Forest, a lowland dipterocarp area containing many trees from the legume family and massive strangler fig plants. Some of the main highlights include a waterfall, campsites, and jungle trekking trails.
- Labis Hot Spring (Pusat Rekreasi Air Panas Labis) – The recreation center is located 35 kilometers from the town center. The amenities include open and covered pools, jacuzzi units, and an outdoor fitness gym.
- St. Philip's Church (Gereja St. Philip) – This is the oldest church in the town and features a Romanesque design from 1924.

== Transportation ==
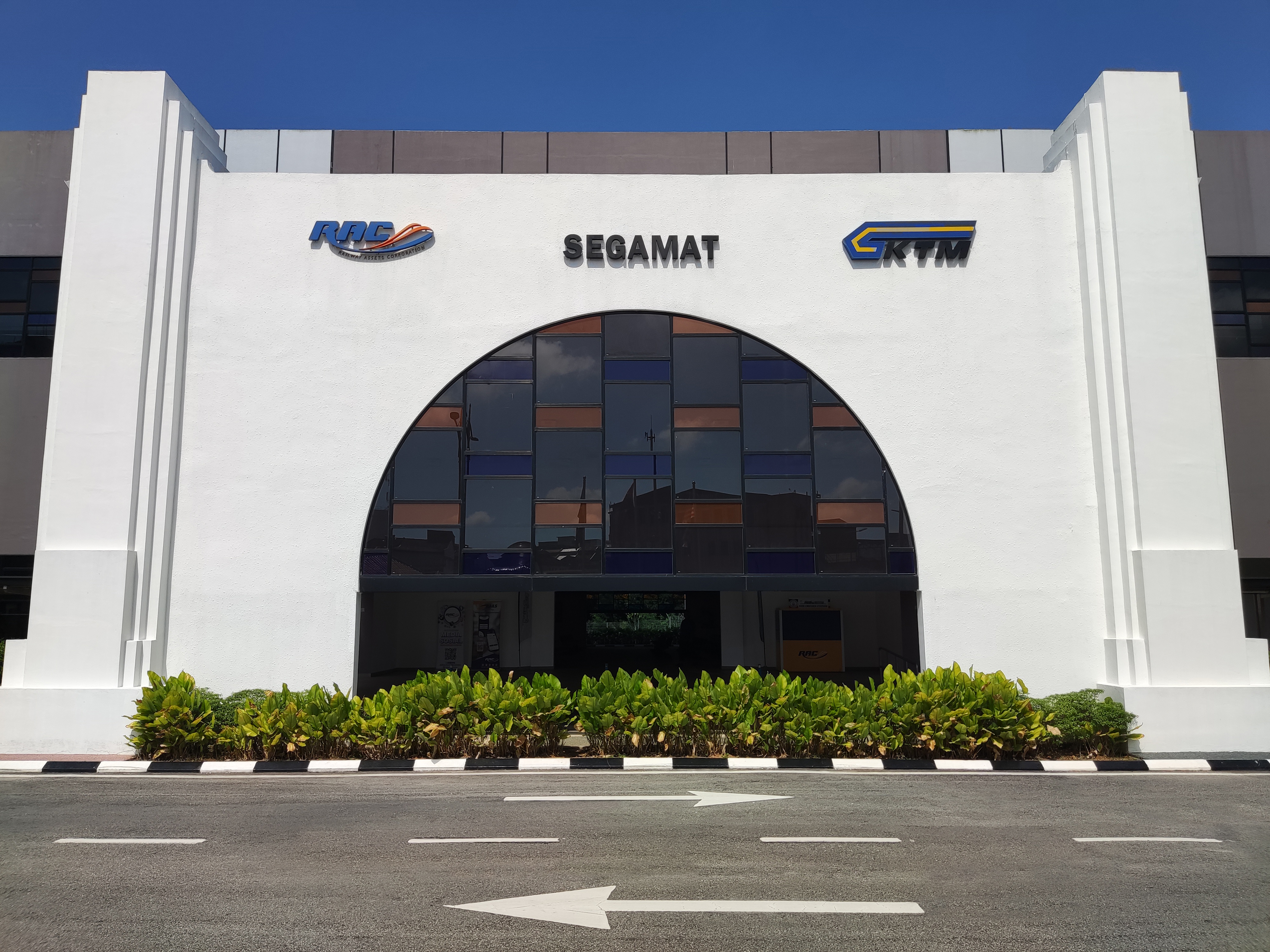
The new Segamat railway station

=== Bus ===
Segamat Intergrated Terminal (Terminal Bersepadu Segamat), formerly known as the Public Transportation Terminal (Terminal Pengangkutan Awam), is the hub for the district's local transit and intercity routes. These include the Muafakat Johor free bus services, as well as express services provided by private bus operators such as KKKL, MARA Liner, and Sanwa Express.

=== Rail ===
The main rail operator in Peninsular Malaysia, Keretapi Tanah Melayu (KTM), serves the district via Segamat, Labis, and Bekok stations. After the commencement of the Electric Train Service (ETS) to Johor following the completion of the Gemas-Johor Bahru EDTP in December 2025, Batu Anam and Tenang stations become inactive, while Genuang station now only serves freight trains.

=== Ports ===
The district houses the Segamat Inland Port, which is located about 13 kilometers from the town center.

== Notable people ==
=== Academic ===
- Dato' Dr. Haji Nooh Gadut, 11th Mufti of Johor
- Prof. Datuk Ts. Dr. Shahrin Sahib, third Vice-Chancellor of Universiti Teknikal Malaysia Melaka (UTeM) and seventh Vice-Chancellor of Universiti Teknologi MARA (UiTM)

=== Entrepreneurship ===
- Dato’ Sri Lee Kar Whatt, founder and managing director of Eco-Shop

=== Politics ===
- Dato' Wan Idris Ibrahim, 9th Menteri Besar of Johor
- Dato' Abdul Ajib Ahmad, 12th Menteri Besar of Johor
- Pang Hok Liong, Member of Parliament (MP) for Labis
- Yeo Bee Yin, Member of Parliament (MP) for Puchong
- Natrah Ismail, former Member of Parliament (MP) for Sekijang

=== Sports ===
- Mohamad Aniq Kasdan, Olympic weightlifter
- Syaqiera Mashayikh, Olympic archer
- Low Zi Yu, badminton player
- S. Thavaneswaran, para runner
- Siti Noor Radiah Ismail, Paralympic long jumper

=== Entertainment ===
- Normala Samsudin, former television personality
- Muzzamer Rahman, film director, screenwriter, and producer
- Achey Bocey, comedian and actor
- David Teo, film and television producer
- Penny Tai, Mandopop singer and songwriter
