= Batu Pahat District =

District in Johor, Malaysia

- District
- Daerah Batu Pahat
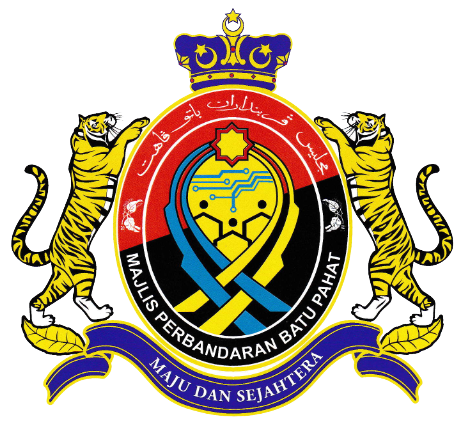
- Flag Emblem
- Interactive map of Batu Pahat District
- Location of Batu Pahat District in Malaysia
- Coordinates: 1°55′N 103°0′E
- Country: Malaysia
- State: Johor
- Seat: Batu Pahat
- Local area government(s): Batu Pahat Municipal Council (West); Yong Peng District Council (East)

Government
  - District officer: Haji Zulkiflee bin Haji Abbas

Area
  - Total: 1,872.58 km^{2} (723.01 sq mi)

Population (2020)
  - Total: 495,338
  - Density: 264.522/km^{2} (685.108/sq mi)
- Time zone: UTC+8 (MST)
  - Summer (DST): UTC+8 (Not observed)
- Postcode: 83xxx and 86xxx
- Calling code: +6-07-42 to +6-07-46
- Vehicle registration plates: J

The Batu Pahat District is a district in the state of Johor, Malaysia. It lies southeast of Muar, southwest of Kluang, northwest of Pontian, south of Segamat and Tangkak District. The capital of the district is Bandar Penggaram.

== Geography ==
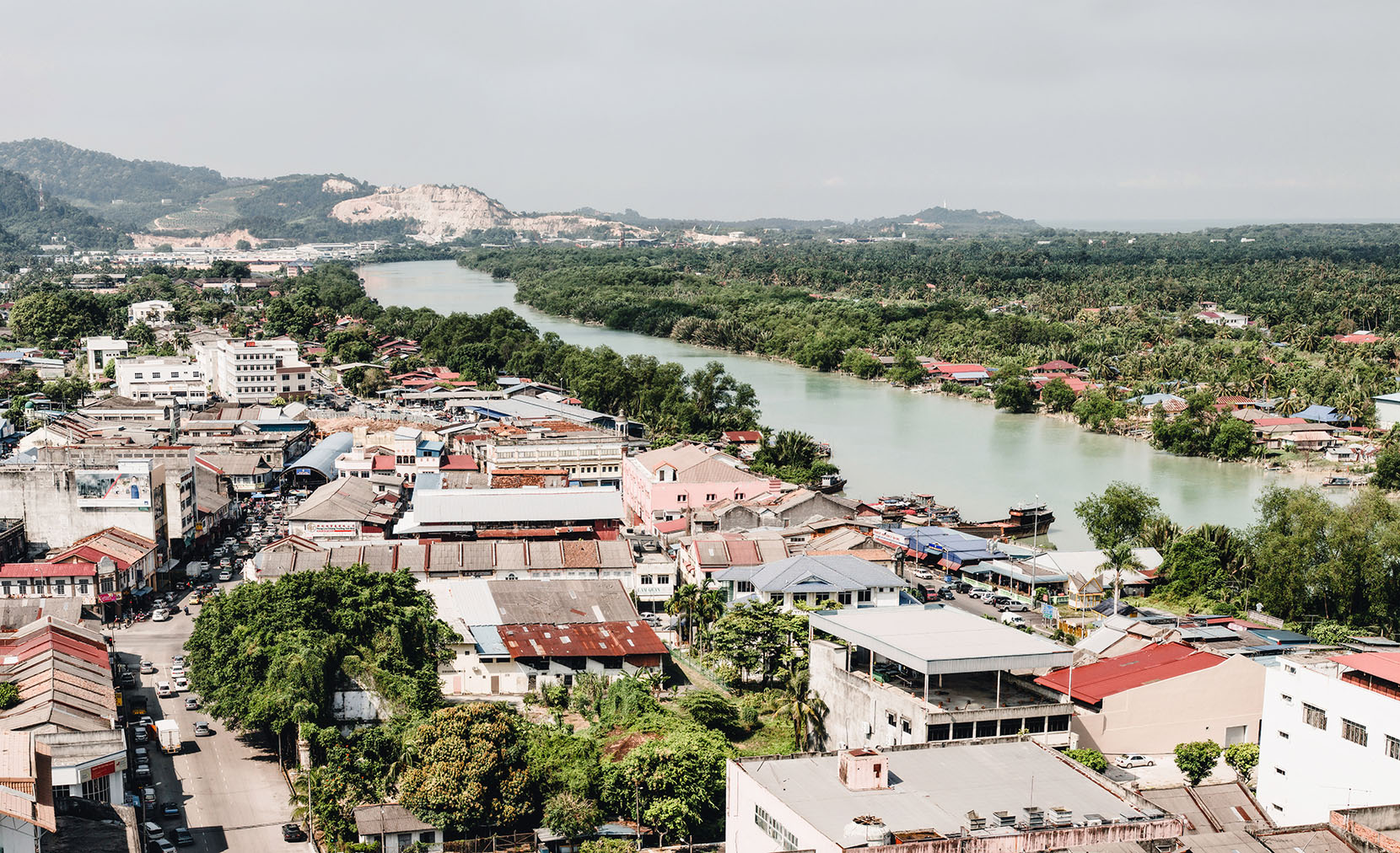
Batu Pahat River

The capital of the district Bandar Penggaram, Batu Pahat is located at 1°51′N 102°56′E. It is 239 km (149 mi) from Kuala Lumpur. The next nearest town is Muar which is 50 km (31 mi) northwest of Batu Pahat. The town of Kluang is located about 52 km (32 mi) to the northeast. Johor Bahru is located about 70 to 100 km (43 to 62 mi) to the southeast of the town.

The district itself borders the districts of Segamat to the north, Kluang to the east, Muar to the west and shares a border in the southeast with the district of Pontian. The coast of the Straits of Melaka lies to the south.

== History ==
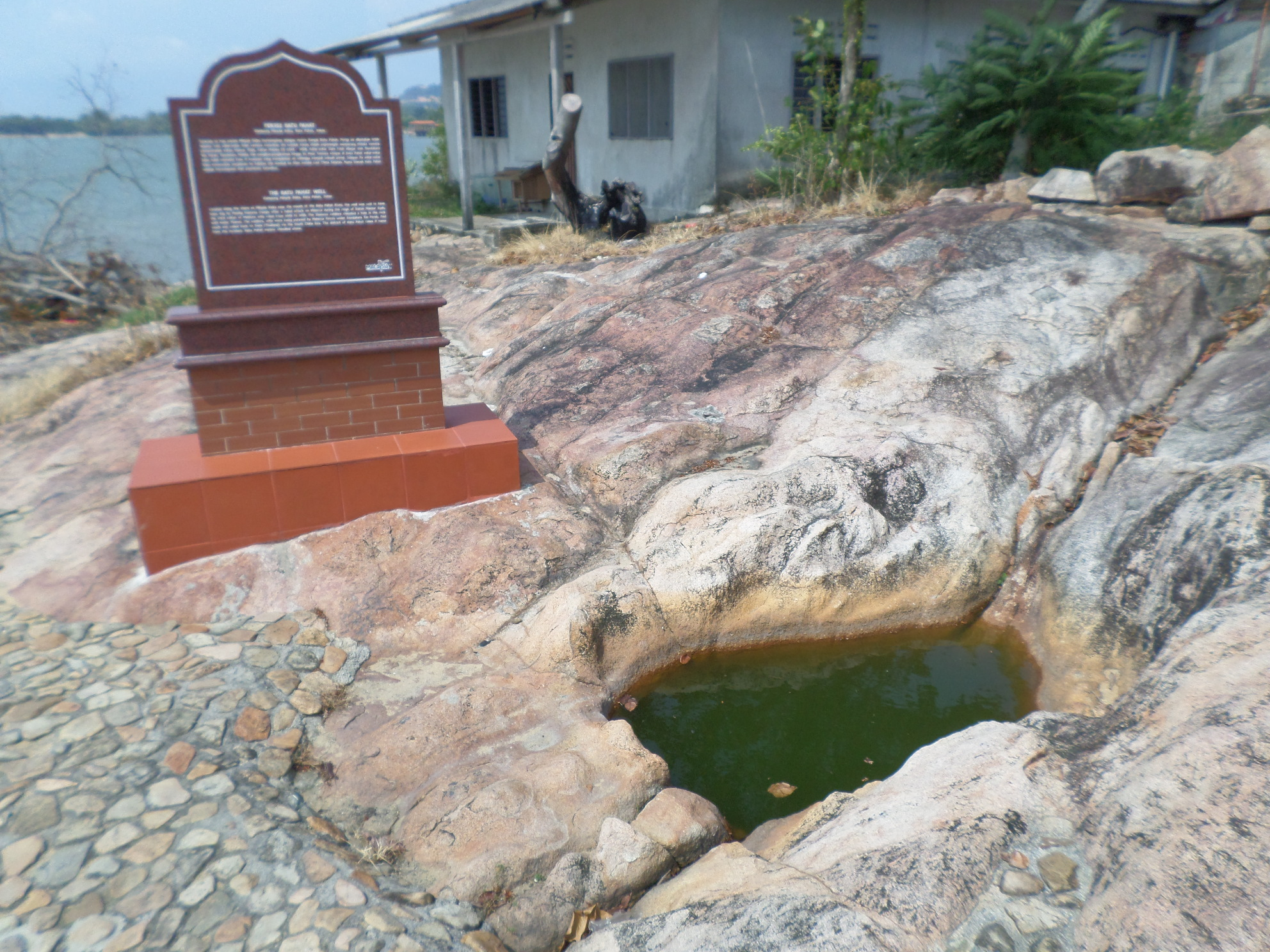
A plaque next to the Batu Pahat Well depicting the town's origin.

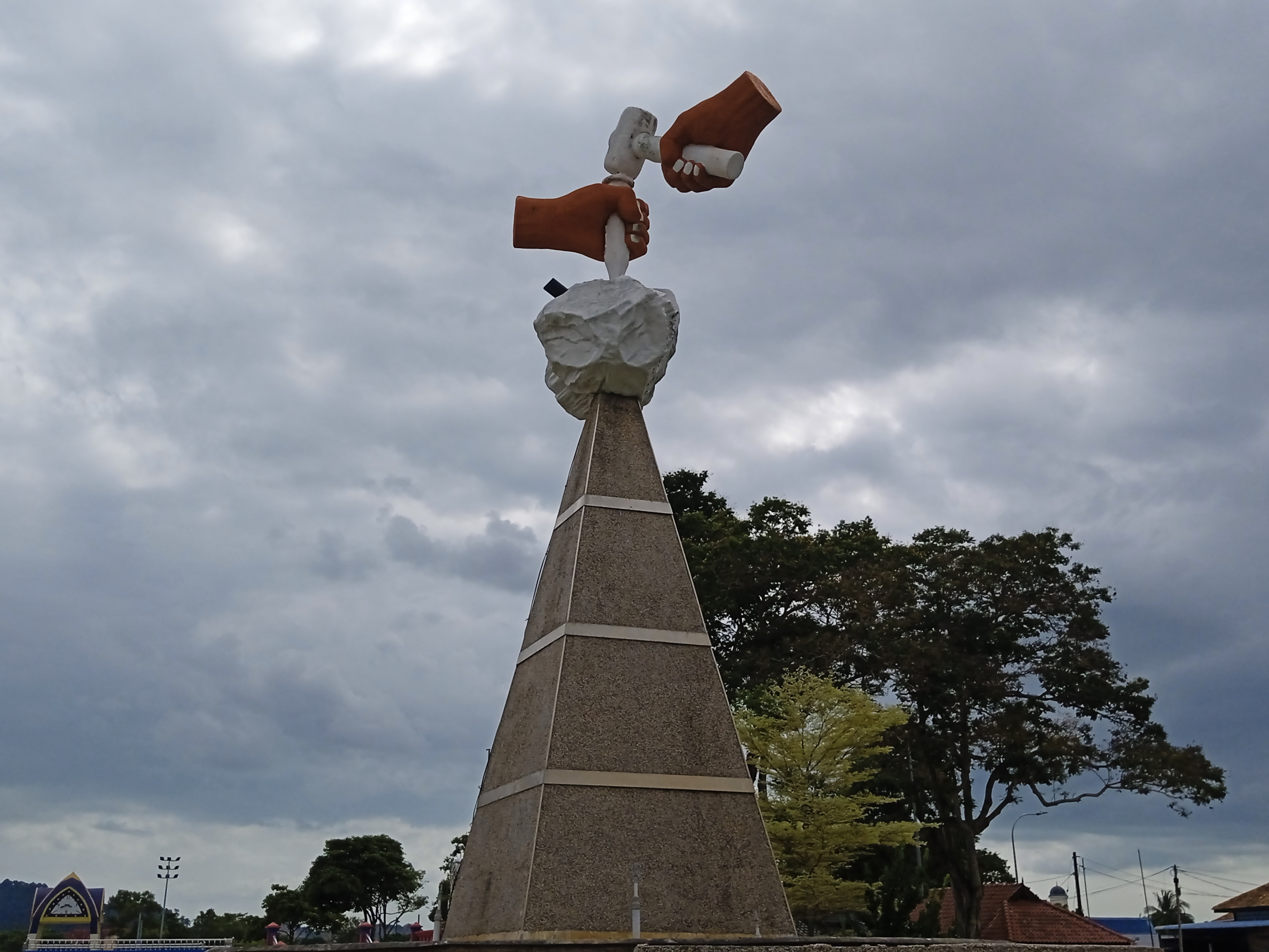
Chiselled stone arch resemble the meaning of Batu Pahat at Penggaram Square.

The town acquired the name Batu Pahat, which means "chiselled stone", from the quarries near the estuary. There are multiple theories as to the origin of this name. In around 1456, the Siamese army, led by Admiral Awi Di Chu, camped in Batu Pahat before attacking Malacca. Legend has it that the invading Siamese troops were chiselling rocks at a rocky spot in the coastal village of Kampung Minyak Beku, in hope to get fresh water during their retreat from the Melaka troops, led by Tun Perak, the famous Bendahara (Prime Minister) of the Malacca Sultanate. Another possible explanation for the origin of the name is the fortress ("A Famosa") built by the Portuguese after capturing Melaka, which was made from granite rocks taken from the mouth of Sungai Batu Pahat.

Renowned for its salted fish in the past, Batu Pahat was formerly known as Bandar Penggaram, which means "town of salt-makers". In 1893/1894, the present township was founded by Dato' Bentara Luar, Mohamed Salleh bin Perang, acting on the orders of the Sultan of Johor, Sultan Abu Bakar.

Batu Pahat was the location of the headquarters for the Fiji Infantry Regiment, serving as part of the Commonwealth forces during the Malayan Emergency, from 1952 to 1956. The 1,600 strong force saw considerable action during the campaign and contributed to the securing of the area during that period.

16 October 1980 was marked as one of Batu Pahat's bloodiest day in recent history. At approximately 9:30 AM, 20 Muslim extremists led by Mohd. Nasir Ismail, stormed into the Batu Pahat Police station with machetes, slashing and injuring 23 police staff and civilians. 8 of the extremists were shot dead by the police. The motive of the attack was never fully determined.

Today, the ancient well can still be found in Minyak Beku, though little was done to maintain this ancient landmark which gives name to the town. For the town's centennial celebration in the early '90s, a quaint monument depicting a floating hand chiselling a rock was set up in the town square. It became the landmark of the town instantaneously. Currently, the newly refurbished town square is popular with locals on weekend nights and also provides as a venue for many public festive celebrations.

Bandar Penggaram, Batu Pahat is growing rapidly and has now developed to become the second major town in Johor state after Johor Bahru.

== Subdivisions and administration ==

The district's 525 gazetted villages (kampung-kampung) and village-clusters (kampung rangkaian) were annexed to their bigger immediate neighbours into mukims for the purpose of administration. The villages are represented by their village heads (ketua-ketua kampung) who answer to the subdistrict chief (Penghulu) administering the mukim. The mukim itself is under the jurisdiction of the Pegawai Daerah or District Officer. The district office of Batu Pahat also has five district engineers (Jurutera Daerah) to oversee all the subdistricts.

The district (daerah) is divided into fourteen mukims, each designated with a number (Mukim 1 to 12, 17, 18):

Type	UPI Code	Name	Population (2020 Census)	Area (km2)	Density (km2 per person)
Mukim	010101	Bagan	8,506	40.75	208.8
Mukim	010102	Chaah Bahru	5,509	306.2	17.99
Mukim	010103	Kampung Bahru	9,636	67.12	143.6
Mukim	010104	Linau	30,439	110.2	276.1
Mukim	010105	Lubok	6,898	44.75	154.2
Mukim	010106	Minyak Beku	19,374	126.0	153.8
Mukim	010107	Peserai	9,933	19.00	522.9
Mukim	010108	Sri Gading	89,834	207.0	433.9
Mukim	010109	Sri Medan	26,319	248.1	106.1
Mukim	010110	Simpang Kanan	182,071	128.1	1,422
Mukim	010111	Simpang Kiri	25,505	116.6	218.7
Mukim	010112	Sungai Kluang	15,563	103.0	151.0
Mukim	010113	Sungai Punggor	10,177	91.17	111.6
Mukim	010114	Tanjung Semberong	38,539	341.6	112.8
Town (Bandar)	010140	Ayer Hitam	525	0.2895	1,813
Town (Bandar)	010141	Bandar Penggaram	11,837	3.982	2,973
Town (Bandar)	010142	Rengit	494	0.2939	1,681
Town (Bandar)	010143	Senggarang	1,991	0.8313	2,395
Town (Bandar)	010144	Yong Peng	2,188	1.016	2,154

1. Lubok (Mukim I) established 1921
2. Bagan (Mukim II) established 1921
3. Peserai (Mukim III) established 1921
4. Simpang Kiri (Mukim IV) established 1925
5. Simpang Kanan (Mukim V) established 1927
6. Linau (Mukim VI) established 1935
7. Tanjung Semberong (Mukim VII) established 1940
8. Sri Gading (Mukim VIII) established 1942
9. Minyak Beku (Mukim IX) established 1943
10. Kampung Bahru (Mukim X) established 1946
11. Sungai Punggor (Mukim XI) established 1949
12. Sungai Kluang (Mukim XII) established 1952
13. Chaah Bahru (Mukim XVII) established 1957
14. Sri Medan (Mukim XVIII) established 1965

Growth in small and medium industries such as textiles, garments and electronics helped to boost development, and Batu Pahat was upgraded to town status (Majlis Perbandaran) in 2001, alongside Muar, Kluang and Skudai.

=== Local authorities ===
Bandar Penggaram, Batu Pahat is administered by Batu Pahat Municipal Council which was upgraded from the previous District Council (Majlis Daerah Batu Pahat Barat) on 9 June 2001 while Yong Peng is administered by Majlis Daerah Yong Peng or Yong Peng District Council which previous named Majlis Daerah Batu Pahat Timur.

- Batu Pahat Municipal Council consists of the following mukim: Sri Gading, Simpang Kanan, Minyak Beku, Kampung Bahru, Sungai Punggor, Sungai Kluang, Linau, Lubok, Bagan and Peserai
- while Yong Peng District Council consists of the following mukim: Tanjung Semberong, Chaah Bahru, Sri Medan, Simpang Kiri

As population in Batu Pahat District is about 495k, by merging of both councils’ income, which are Majlis Perbandaran Batu Pahat (MPBP) and Majlis Daerah Yong Peng (MDYP), Batu Pahat is potential to upgrade as Majlis Bandaraya Batu Pahat (MBBP) in the coming years.

Minimum requirement eligible for a council to upgrade as City Council (Majlis Bandaraya 市政局) are:-

- Population: >500k
- Council Income: >100 million
- Others: Availability of best public services (transportation, tertiary education hub, important industrial hub, etc.)

=== Towns ===
- Rengit
- Yong Peng
- Semerah
- Parit Sulong
- Sri Gading
- Parit Raja
- Senggarang
- Tongkang Pechah
- Sri Medan
- Parit Yaani

== Demographics ==
Historical population
Year	Pop.	±%
1991	294,056	—
2000	336,509	+14.4%
2010	401,902	+19.4%
2020	495,338	+23.2%

The district of Batu Pahat has a population of about 398,014 local residents. The population growth in 2000 was 1.55%. The most populated mukim is Simpang Kanan with more than 311,862 people and the least populated is Bagan with a population of only 4,692.

The Malays are the majority (51%), while the Chinese is the largest minority (46%) and the Indian (3%).

The major religions are Islam, Buddhism, Taoism, Confucianism, Christianity and Hinduism.

Batu Pahat has more than four hundred Chinese temples due to the large Chinese population. Some of these temples are more than one century old and many have also become popular tourist attractions. Many devotees and tourists visited these temples and this has become an important part of the local economy. Chong Long Gong Temple (海口石文丁崇龙宫) was founded in 1864, is one of the popular tourist spot for devotees. A Chinese temple located at Bukit Pasir is the Kian Nam Shee Temple (建南寺). The Lim Sz Chong Su Tian Hou Temple (峇株吧辖林氏宗祠天后宫) was established in 1912 and is located in the downtown. There are also Buddhist temples or centres like Bhaddekaratta Hermitage (一夜贤者禅院), Bhavana Buddhist Society and Batu Pahat Insight Meditation Society.

There are two main mosques in Batu Pahat: Dato' Bentara Luar Mosque (located at Jalan Ampuan) and Sultan Ismail Mosque (located at Jalan Kluang)

== Federal Parliament and State Assembly Seats ==
List of Batu Pahat district representatives in the Federal Parliament (Dewan Rakyat)

Parliament	Seat Name	Member of Parliament	Party
P147	Parit Sulong	Noraini Ahmad	Barisan Nasional (UMNO)
P148	Ayer Hitam	Wee Ka Siong	Barisan Nasional (MCA)
P149	Sri Gading	Aminolhuda Hassan	Pakatan Harapan (AMANAH)
P150	Batu Pahat	Onn Abu Bakar	Pakatan Harapan (PKR)

List of Batu Pahat district representatives in the State Legislative Assembly (Dewan Undangan Negeri)

Parliament	State	Seat Name	State Assemblyman	Party
P147	N17	Semerah	Mohd Fared Mohd Khalid	Barisan Nasional (UMNO)
P147	N18	Sri Medan	Zulkarnain Kamisan	Barisan Nasional (UMNO)
P148	N19	Yong Peng	Ling Tian Soon	Barisan Nasional (MCA)
P148	N20	Semarang	Samsol Bari Jamali	Barisan Nasional (UMNO)
P149	N21	Parit Yaani	Mohd Najib Samuri	Barisan Nasional (UMNO)
P149	N22	Parit Raja	Nor Rashidah Ramli	Barisan Nasional (UMNO)
P150	N23	Penggaram	Gan Peck Cheng	Pakatan Harapan (DAP)
P150	N24	Senggarang	Mohd Yusla Ismail	Barisan Nasional (UMNO)
P150	N25	Rengit	Mohd Puad Zarkashi	Barisan Nasional (UMNO)

== Election results ==
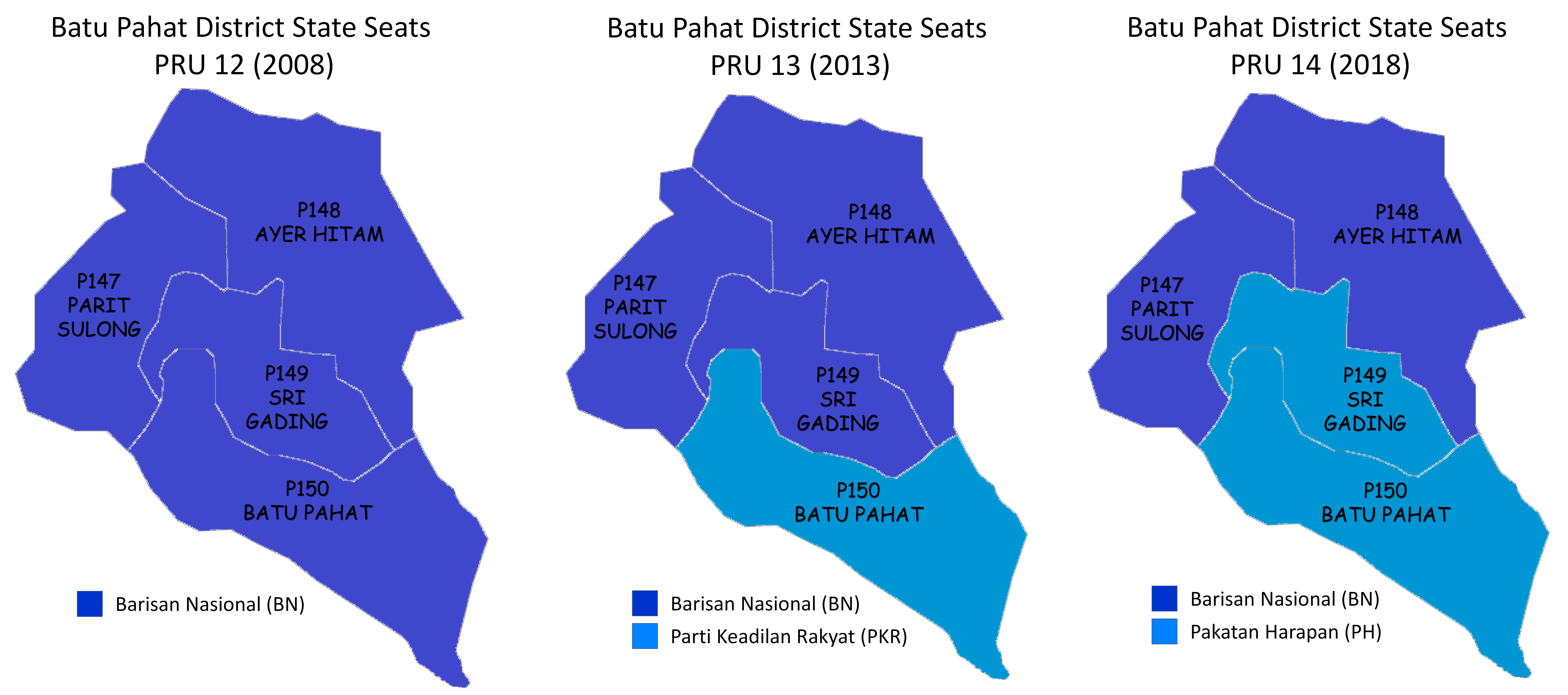
Comparison of the parliamentary seat results in Batu Pahat district with PRU-12 (year 2008), PRU-13 (year 2013) and PRU-14 (year 2018)

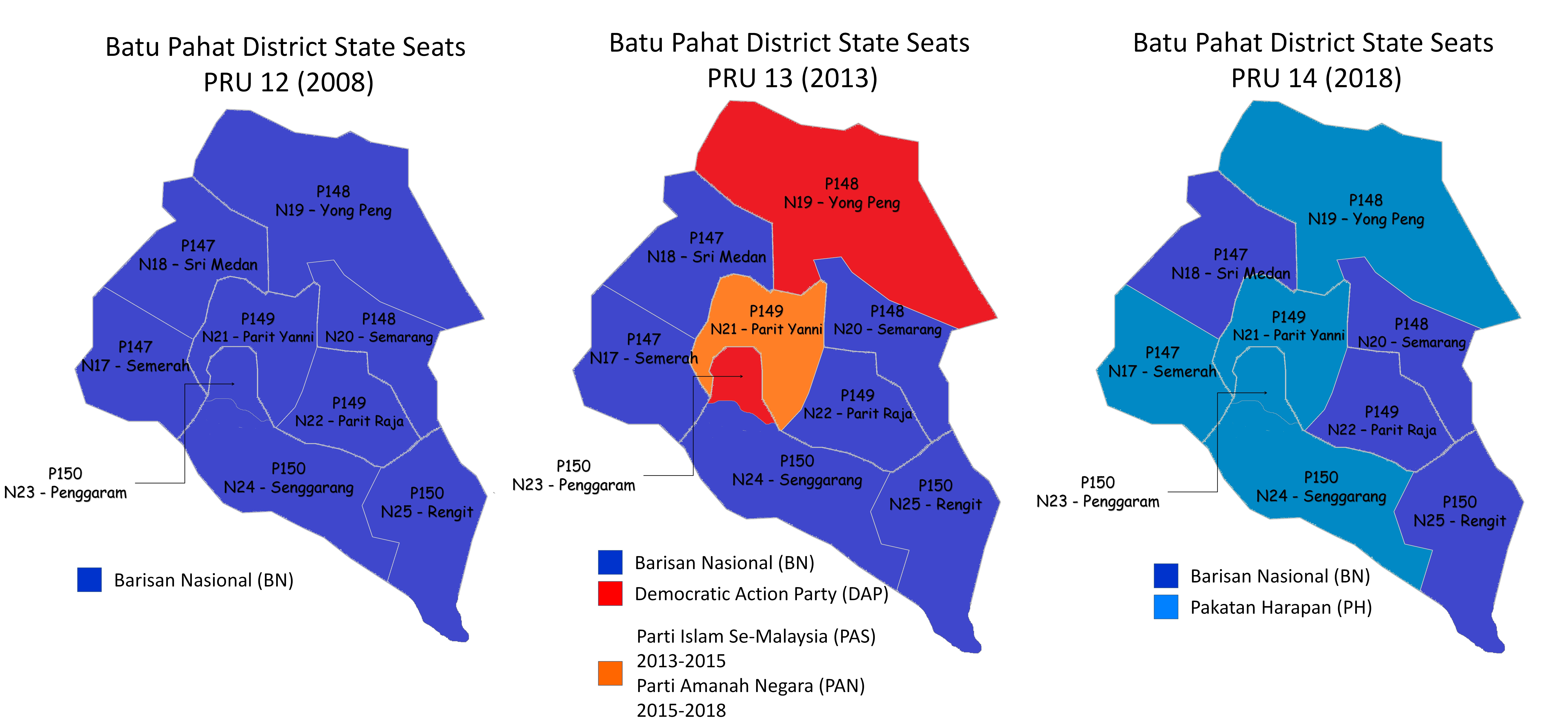
Comparison of the state seat results in Batu Pahat district with PRU-12 (year 2008), PRU-13 (year 2013) and PRU-14 (year 2018)

Due to electoral division by Election Commission of Malaysia, there are three parliamentary and state constituencies (DUN) dividing Batu Pahat town. There are (P147) Parit Sulong parliamentary seat, (N17) Semerah state seat; (P149) Parliament Sri Gading parliamentary seat, (N21) Parit Yanni state seat and (P150) Batu Pahat parliamentary seat, (N23) Penggaram state seat. (Election Results of the 13th Malaysian General Elections) The last election results listed as below:

P150 - Batu Pahat parliament seat

Parliament of Malaysia: P150 Batu Pahat, Johor.
Year	Government	Votes	Pct	Opposition	Votes	Pct	Opposition	Votes	Pct
2018	Haji Mohd Rashid Hasnon (PH)	45,929	56%	Haliza binti Abdullah (BN)	28,035	34%	Dr Mahfodz (PAS)	8,173	10%
2013	Mohd Idris bin Jusi (PKR)	38,667	51%	Mohd Puad Zarkashi (UMNO)	36,935	49%			
2008	Mohd Puad Zarkashi (UMNO)	32,593	61%	Muhammad Abdullah (PKR)	19,625	37%			
2004	Dr Junaidy And Wahab (UMNO)	38,982	78%	Mohamed Hanipa Maidin (PAS)	9,880	20%			

N23 - Penggaram state seat
(Cover most of the area of Batu Pahat town)

Johor State Assembly: N23-Penggaram, Batu Pahat, Johor.
Year	Government	Votes	Pct	Opposition	Votes	Pct	Opposition	Votes	Pct	Opposition	Votes	Pct
2022	Gan Peck Cheng 颜碧贞 (PH-DAP)	18208	53.67%	Ter Hwa Kwong 戴華光 (BN-MCA)	8252	24.32%	Ronald Sia 謝委健 (PN-BERSATU)	5276	15.55%	Zahari Osman (IND)	2190	6.46%
2018	Gan Peck Cheng 颜碧贞 (PH)	26,825	64.43%	Kang Beng Kuan 江明光 (BN)	9,620	23.10%	Misran bin Samian (PAS)	5,185	12.47%			
2013	Gan Peck Cheng 颜碧贞 (DAP)	24,277	62%	Dr. King Ban Siang 龚万祥 (MCA)	14,226	37%						
2008	Datuk Koh Chee Chai 高志财 (MCA)	12,761	47%	Gan Peck Cheng 颜碧贞 (DAP)	12,186	45%						
2004	Datuk Koh Chee Chai 高志财 (MCA)	16,845	69%	Gan Peck Cheng 颜碧贞 (DAP)	6,247	26%						
1999	Datuk Seri Dr. Chua Soi Lek 蔡细历 (MCA)	20,809	74%	Gan Peck Cheng 颜碧贞 (DAP)	7,349	26%						
1995	Datuk Seri Dr. Chua Soi Lek 蔡细历 (MCA)	20,174	77%	Gan Peck Cheng 颜碧贞 (DAP)	6,137	23%						

P149 - Sri Gading parliamentary seat

Parliament of Malaysia: P149 Sri Gading, Batu Pahat, Johor.
Year	Government	Votes	Pct	Opposition	Votes	Pct	Opposition	Votes	Pct
2018	Dr Shahruddin Salleh (PH)	21,511	49%	AB AZIZ BIN KAPRAWI (BN)	18,223	41%	Haji M Ashari Sidon (PAS)	4,548	10%
2013	AB AZIZ BIN KAPRAWI (UMNO)	22,453	57%	MOHD KHUZZAN BIN ABU BAKAR (PKR)	16,692	42%			
2008	Datuk Mohamad Aziz (UMNO)	19,641	68%	Ali Markom (PKR)	8,767	31%			
2004	Datuk Mohamad Aziz (UMNO)	21,512	80%	Dr Ahmad Faidi Saidi (PKR)	5,316	20%			

N21 - Parit Yanni state seat
(Part of the division in Batu Pahat town e.g.: Taman Maju, Taman Flora Utama, Parit Besar, BP Mall)

Parliament of Malaysia: N21 Parit Yanni, Batu Pahat, Johor.
Year	Government	Votes	Pct	Opposition	Votes	Pct	Opposition	Votes	Pct
2018	AMINOLHUDA BIN HASSAN (PH)	12,309	54%	Soh Lip Yan 蘇立言 (BN)	7,475	33%	Haji Nasir (PAS)	2,943	13%
2013	AMINOLHUDA BIN HASSAN (PAS)	11,278	52%	TEO YEW CHUAN 张有全 (MCA)	10,090	47%			
2008	Ng See Tiong 黃世忠 (MCA)	9,419	61%	Hashim Jusoh (PAS)	5,562	37%			
2004	Ng See Tiong 黃世忠 (MCA)	10,535	76%	Muhamad Yusof Masran (PKR)	3,259	24%			

P147 - Parit Sulong parliamentary seat

Parliament of Malaysia: P147 Parit Sulong, Batu Pahat, Johor.
Year	Government	Votes	Pct	Opposition	Votes	Pct	Opposition	Votes	Pct
2018	NORAINI BINTI AHMAD (BN)	24,281	49%	Anis Afida (PH)	18,140	37%	Ahmad Rosdi bin Bahari (PAS)	7,148	14%
2013	NORAINI BINTI AHMAD (UMNO)	30,258	61%	KHAIRUDDIN BIN A RAHIM (PAS)	18,505	38%			
2008	NORAINI BINTI AHMAD (UMNO)	26,066	66%	Faisal Ali (PAS)	12,467	32%			
2004	NORAINI BINTI AHMAD (UMNO)	26,974	71%	Suhaizan Kaiat (PAS)	9,788	24%			

N17 - Semerah state seat
(Part of the division in Batu Pahat town e.g.: Taman Pantai, Jalan Syahbandar, Jalan Rugayah)

Parliament of Malaysia: N17 Semerah, Batu Pahat, Johor.
Year	Government	Votes	Pct	Opposition	Votes	Pct	Opposition	Votes	Pct
2018	Khuzzan Abu Bakar (PH)	12,619	42.85%	MOHD ISMAIL BIN ROSLAN (BN)	12,521	42.51%	Ustaz Wan (PAS)	4,314	14.64%
2013	MOHD ISMAIL BIN ROSLAN (UMNO)	14,404	55%	MD YSAHRUDIN BIN KUSNI (PKR)	11,755	45%			
2008	Datuk Ariss Samsudin (UMNO)	13,156	61%	Muhamad Hasmi Hashim (PKR)	8,082	38%			
2004	Datuk Ariss Samsudin (UMNO)	15,715	74%	Mazlan Aliman (PAS)	5,046	24%			

== Economy ==
The main economy activities in the district are furniture manufacturing, food processing and agritourism. Main industrial towns in the district are Ayer Hitam, Batu Pahat Town, Pekan Sri Wangi, Parit Sulong and Yong Peng. As of 2010, the per capita income was MYR14,122. Local "pasar malam" or night markets are held in residential areas with petty traders setting up stalls and selling a variety of food and daily necessities at bargain prices.

== Education ==
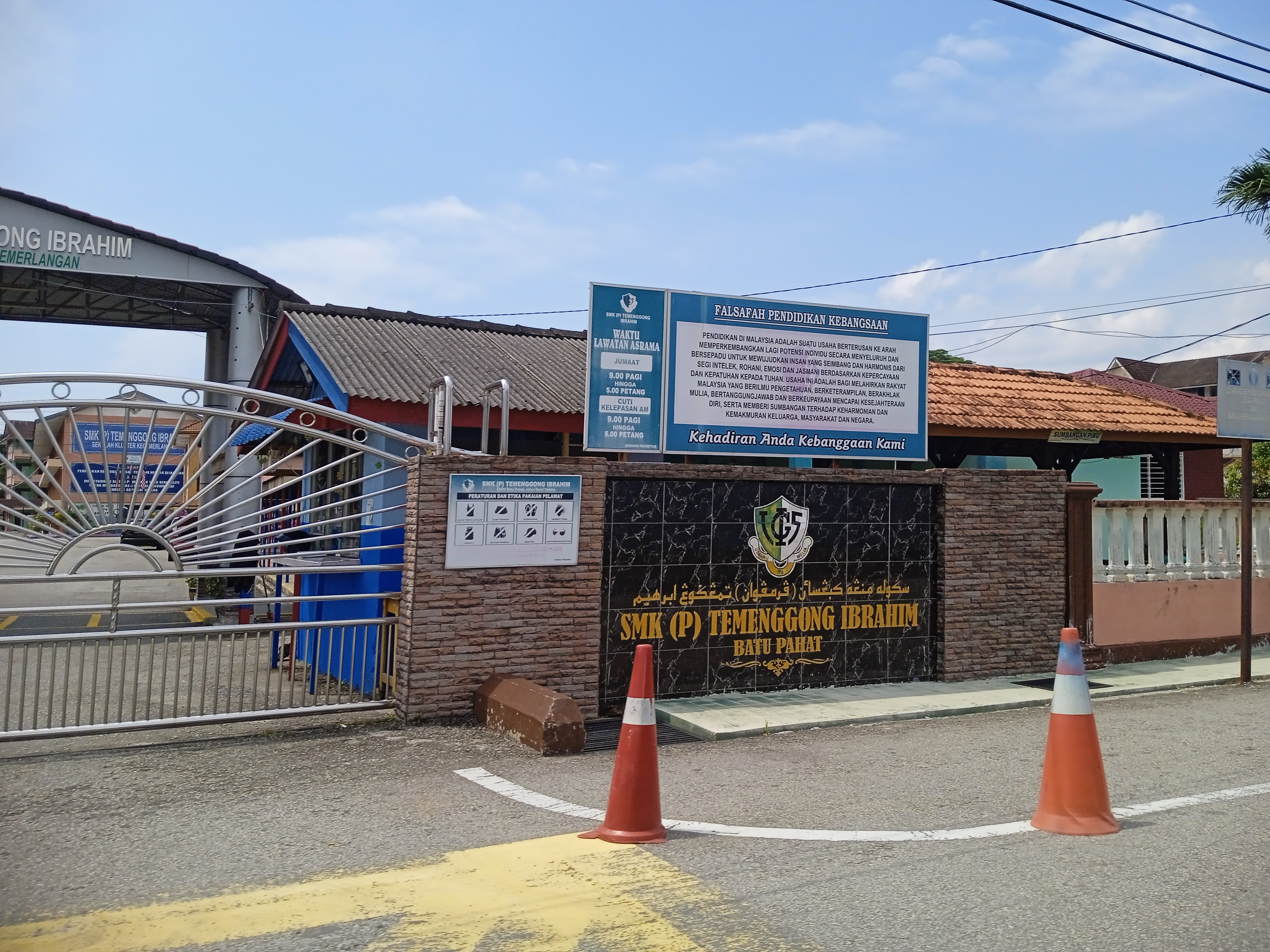
SMK Temenggong Ibrahim

In Batu Pahat, there are 24 national secondary schools, 3 independent Chinese secondary schools and a vocational school. Among some of the best secondary schools in Batu Pahat are:

- SMK Dato Bentara Luar
- Maktab Rendah Sains MARA Batu Pahat (MRSM)
- SMK Tinggi Batu Pahat (High School Batu Pahat, HSBP)
- Chinese High School
- SM Sains Batu Pahat
- SMK Temenggong Ibrahim (Temenggong Ibrahim Girls' School)
- SMK Dato' Sulaiman (SMKDS)
- SMK Tun Aminah
- SMK Convent
- SMK Dato' Onn
- SMK Dato Syed Esa (formerly called SMK Jalan Kolam Air)
- SMK Munshi Sulaiman
- SMK Datin Onn Jaafar
- SM Teknik
- SMK Banang Jaya
- SMK Permata Jaya
- SMK Semerah
- SMK Tunku Putra
- SMK Sri Medan

== Notable people ==
- Mohid Mohamed, Chief Secretary for the Ministry of Youth and Sport
