= Batu Pahat River =

River of Johor, Malaysia

Coordinates: 1°51′11.7″N 102°55′26.8″E

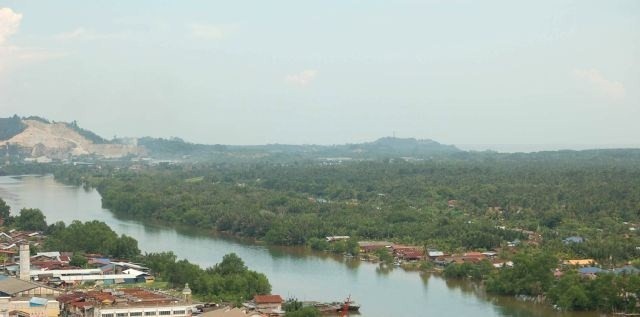
- Native name: Sungai Batu Pahat (Malay)

Location
- Country: Pantai Minyak Beku, Batu Pahat (Bandar Penggaram)

Physical characteristics
- Source
  - location: Simpang Kanan, Batu Pahat
- Mouth
  - location: Pantai Minyak Beku, Batu Pahat, Johor

The Batu Pahat River (Malay: Sungai Batu Pahat) is a river originating from Sungai Simpang Kiri and Sungai Simpang Kanan (in which the river split as Sungai Bekok and Sungai Sembrong in Tanjung Sembrong) near Tongkang Pechah, and flows through Batu Pahat (Bandar Penggaram) and until it reaches the mouth of the river in Pantai Minyak Beku, a seaside village lying on the west coast of Johor, Malaysia.

The total length of the river is 12 km.

== See also ==
- Geography of Malaysia
