= Lubok, Johor =

Lubok parish Mukim Lubok
- Parish / Mukim
- Lubok in Batu Pahat District
- Country: Malaysia
- State: Johor
- District: Batu Pahat

Lubok Mukim (also known as "Mukim 1" in Malay Mukim Lubok) is a mukim in Batu Pahat District, Johor, Malaysia. This district would be surrounded by the mukims of Bagan (east) and Simpang Kiri (River Left) (north) and the Muar district (west).

== Administration ==
Lubok is one of 14 mukims found in Batu Pahat, Johor.

Lubok Mukim covers several villages.
