= Batu Pahat Well =

Well in Batu Pahat, Johor, Malaysia

Coordinates: 1.79577°N 102.88946°E

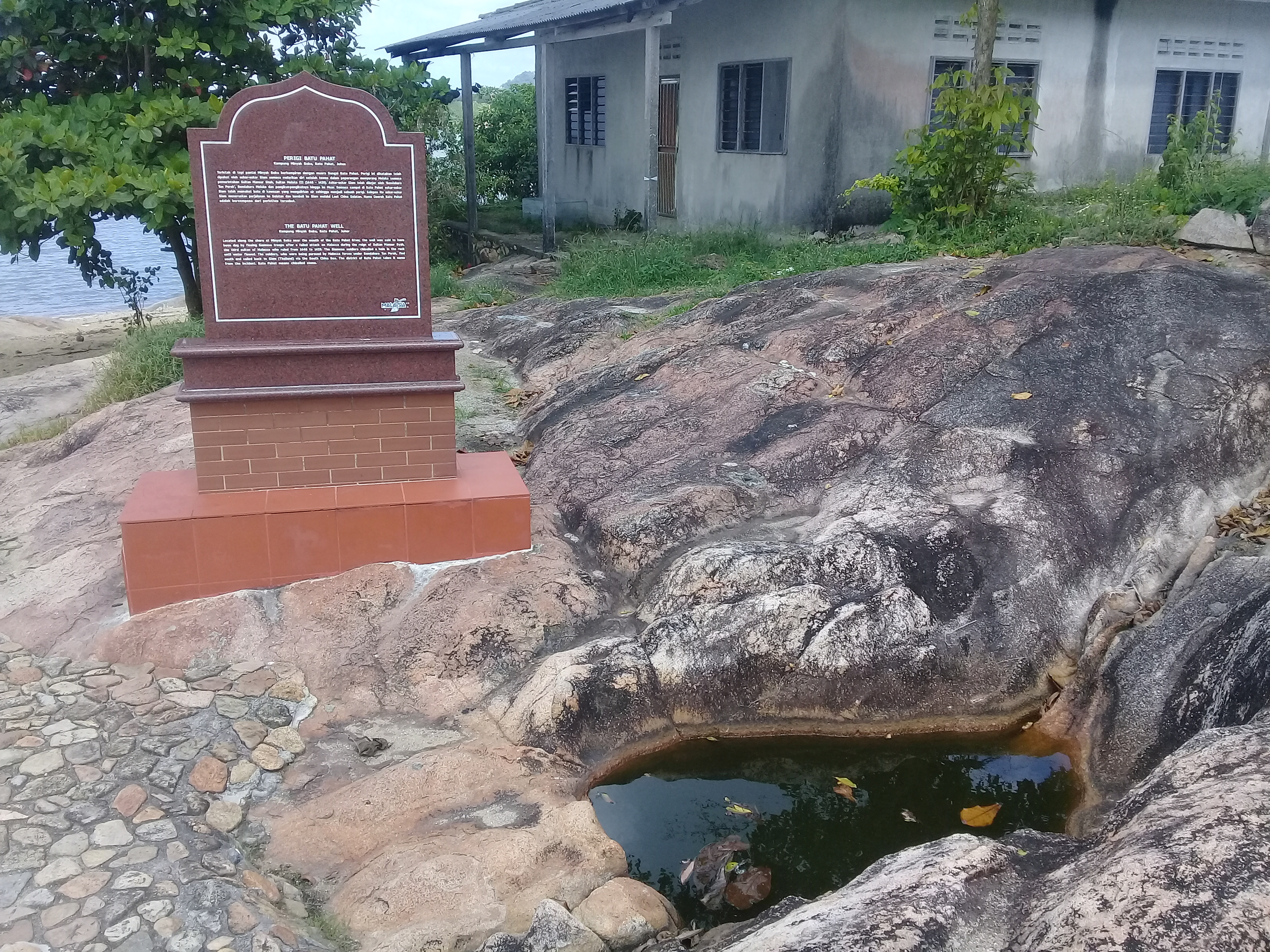
The Batu Pahat Well.

The Batu Pahat Well (Malay: Perigi Batu Pahat) is a historic well at the village of Minyak Beku, Batu Pahat District, Johor, Malaysia. It was allegedly built during the 15th century by fleeing Siamese soldiers from the Malacca Sultanate, who chiselled the rocks around it in search of water. It was said that the name of the town of Batu Pahat was originated from the well's name. It is currently one of the most popular tourist destinations of the area.
