= Kampung Baru =

Kampung Baru may refer to several places:

- Kampung Baru, Kuala Lumpur, an area in Kuala Lumpur, Malaysia
  - Kampung Baru LRT station, serving the area
- Kampung Baru, Pasar Rebo, an administrative village of Pasar Rebo, East Jakarta, Indonesia
- Any of the New Villages set up to keep the local Chinese during the Malayan Emergency

== See also ==
- Kampung Bahru, a subdistrict located in Batu Pahat District, Johor, Malaysia
