= Sungai Kluang =

Sungai Kluang Mukim Sungai Kluang
- Mukim
- Sungai Kluang in Batu Pahat District.

- Location within Johor
- Coordinates: 1°39′59″N 103°10′08″E
- Country: Malaysia
- State: Johor
- District: Batu Pahat

Population (2010)
  - Total: 16,591
- Time zone: UTC+8 (MST)

Mukim Sungai Kluang or Sungai Keluang (also known as Mukim 12) is a mukim (Malay for subdistrict) located in Batu Pahat District in Johor, Malaysia. Batu Pahat District was divided into 14 mukims, each of which encompasses several villages. The population was 16,591 in 2010. The majority ethics of the population in the Sungai Kluang is Malay (11,854). It border with Mukim Benut, Pontian District in east and Mukim Sungai Punggor in west.

== Settlement ==
Mukim Sungai Kluang comprises the following populated village, among them are:

- Kampung Belahan Tampok Laut
- Kampung Belahan Tampok
- Kampung Parit Tengah Seri Merlong
- Kampung Parit Tengah Seri Aman
- Kampung Parit Haji Siraj
- Kampung Sungai Merlong
- Kampung Seri Merlong
- Kampung Parit Wak Kawik
- Kampung Parit Haji Noor
- Kampung Sungai Bagan
- Kampung Sungai Bagan Laut
- Kampung Sungai Bagan Darat
- Kampung Parit Daeng Machening
- Kampung Sungai Jambi
- Kampung Sungai Jambi Laut
- Kampung Sungai Jambi Darat
- Kampung Sungai Kluang Laut
- Kampung Sungai Kluang Darat
- Kampung Parit Jalal
- Kampung Parit Latiff
- Kampung Kuala Sungai Rengit
- Kampung Parit Amat
- Kampung Parit Sarpan
- Kampung Parit No. Satu Rengit
- Kampung Parit Masjid
- Kampung Parit Seri Borhan
- Kampung Parit Lapis Seri Borhan
- Kampung Parit Korea Selatan
- Kampung Rengit Laut
- Kampung Parit Lapis
- Kampung Parit Tengah Seri Ladang
- Kampung Parit Besar
- Kampung Parit Gantung
- Kampung Parit Lapis Gantung

The mukim also encompasses the town and housing area:

- Bandar Rengit
- Taman Pandan Jaya 1
- Taman Kavang Muhibbah
- Taman Ria
- Taman Ria Dua/2
- Taman Seri Damai
- Taman Dato Jalal
- Taman Jasa Amir
