= Gan Peck Cheng =

Malaysian politician and kindergarten teacher

- 颜碧贞

Deputy Speaker of the Johor State Legislative Assembly
- In office 28 June 2018 – 22 January 2022
- Monarch: Ibrahim Iskandar
- Menteri Besar: Osman Sapian (2018–2019); Sahruddin Jamal (2019–2020); Hasni Mohammad (2020–2022)
- Speaker: Suhaizan Kayat
- Preceded by: Baderi Dasuki
- Succeeded by: Samsolbari Jamali
- Constituency: Penggaram

State Leader of the Opposition of Johor
- In office 12 October 2015 – 28 June 2018
- Monarch: Ibrahim Iskandar
- Menteri Besar: Mohamed Khaled Nordin
- Preceded by: Boo Cheng Hau
- Succeeded by: Hasni Mohammad
- Constituency: Penggaram

Member of the Johor State Legislative Assembly for Penggaram
- In office 5 May 2013 – 11 July 2026
- Preceded by: Koh Chee Chai (BN–MCA)
- Succeeded by: Felicia Poh Rui Ling (PH–DAP)
- Majority: 10,051 (2013); 17,205 (2018); 9,956 (2022)

State Vice Chairman of the Democratic Action Party of Johor
- Incumbent
- Assumed office 6 October 2024 Serving with Sheikh Umar Bagharib Ali
- Secretary-General: Anthony Loke Siew Fook
- State Chairman: Teo Nie Ching
- Preceded by: Ramakrishnan Suppiah

Personal details
- Born: Gan Peck Cheng; 21 November 1966 (age 59) Kampung Minyak Beku, Batu Pahat, Johor, Malaysia
- Citizenship: Malaysian
- Party: Democratic Action Party (DAP)
- Other political affiliations: Gagasan Rakyat (GR) (1990–1996); Barisan Alternatif (BA) (1999–2004); Pakatan Rakyat (PR) (2008-2015); Pakatan Harapan (PH) (since 2015)
- Parent: (颜亚良) (father)
- Occupation: Politician
- Profession: Kindergarten teacher
- Website: Facebook

Gan Peck Cheng (simplified Chinese: 颜碧贞; traditional Chinese: 顏碧貞; pinyin: Yán Bìzhēn; Pe̍h-ōe-jī: Gân Phek-cheng, born 21 November 1966) is a Malaysian politician and kindergarten teacher who served as Deputy Speaker of the Johor State Legislative Assembly from June 2018 to January 2022, State Leader of the Opposition of Johor from October 2015 to May 2018 and Member of the Johor State Legislative Assembly (MLA) for Penggaram from May 2013 to July 2026. She is a member of the Democratic Action Party (DAP), a component party of the Pakatan Harapan (PH) and formerly Pakatan Rakyat (PR), Barisan Alternatif (BA) and Gagasan Rakyat (GR) coalitions.

== Personal life ==
She was born in Kampung Minyak Beku, Batu Pahat, Johor. She got her secondary education in Chinese High School Batu Pahat.

== Earlier career ==
Before she served as a state assemblywoman, she has been working as a kindergarten teacher.

== Political career ==
Gan contested the Pontian federal seat and Penggaram state seat in the 1990 general and Johor state elections and again only for the Penggaram state seat in the 1995, 1999, 2004 and 2008 Johor state elections in which she suffered electoral defeats. In the 2013 general election, she finally broke her streak of five electoral defeats and ended her 23-year wait to be elected as an MLA. She gained her long-awaited victory in the same seat of Penggaram by defeating her opponents King Ban Siang from Malaysian Chinese Association (MCA) of Barisan Nasional (BN) with 10,051 majority votes.

In 2014, Gan came out tops in the Johor DAP state committee polls, receiving 271 votes. Gan, a former DAP state secretary, was appointed the new State Leader of the Opposition of Johor on 27 October 2015 to replace Boo Cheng Hau who had resigned.

In the 2018 Johor state election, she retained her Penggaram state seat for her second term with higher majority of votes and was then appointed to be the first ever female Deputy Speaker of the Johor State Legislative Assembly in history after PH took over the Johor state administration led by Menteri Besar Osman Sapian. In February 2020, the PH state administration was overthrown and replaced with the new BN state administration led by new Menteri Besar Hasni Mohammad and PH returned to the state opposition after only 22 months in power. However, given her identity as an opposition MLA, she was not removed from the deputy speakership and retained by the new administration along with Speaker Suhaizan Kayat who is also from the opposition. This became one of a very rare cases in which the speakers are from the opposition instead of the government in Malaysia.

In the 2022 Johor state election, she retained her Penggaram state seat and was reelected for her third term by defeating all of her opponents but with a significantly lessened majority of only 9,952 votes compared to her last victory in 2018. After BN returned to the state government after its victory, she and Suhaizan were not reappointed the speaker and deputy speaker of the assembly respectively.

== Election results ==
Parliament of Malaysia
Year	Constituency	Candidate	Votes	Pct	Opponent(s)	Votes	Pct	Ballots cast	Majority	Turnout
1990	P133 Pontian	Gan Peck Cheng (DAP)	14,978	38.07%	Ong Ka Ting (MCA)	24,362	61.93%	41,637	9,384	75.06%

Johor State Legislative Assembly
Year	Constituency	Candidate	Votes	Pct	Opponent(s)	Votes	Pct	Ballots cast	Majority	Turnout
1995	N23 Penggaram	Gan Peck Cheng (DAP)	6,137	21.99%	Chua Soi Lek (MCA)	20,174	72.30%	27,905	14,037	73.97%
1999	N23 Penggaram	Gan Peck Cheng (DAP)	7,349	24.87%	Chua Soi Lek (MCA)	20,809	70.41%	29,552	13,460	74.95%
2004	N23 Penggaram	Gan Peck Cheng (DAP)	6,247	25.40%	Koh Chee Chai (MCA)	16,845	68.51%	24,598	10,598	74.68%
2008	N23 Penggaram	Gan Peck Cheng (DAP)	12,186	46.42%	Koh Chee Chai (MCA)	12,761	48.61%	26,252	575	76.05%
2013	N23 Penggaram	Gan Peck Cheng (DAP)	24,277	61.60%	King Ban Siang (MCA)	14,226	36.10%	39,408	10,051	87.30%
2018	N23 Penggaram	Gan Peck Cheng (DAP)	26,825	63.79%	Kang Beng Kuan (MCA)	9,620	22.88%	42,050	17,205	84.52%
2018	N23 Penggaram	Gan Peck Cheng (DAP)	26,825	63.79%	Misran Samian (PAS)	5,185	12.33%	42,050	17,205	84.52%
2022	N23 Penggaram	Gan Peck Cheng (DAP)	18,208	53.67%	Ter Hwa Kwong (MCA)	8,252	24.32%	33,926	9,956	48.19%
2022	N23 Penggaram	Gan Peck Cheng (DAP)	18,208	53.67%	Ronald Sia Wee Yet (BERSATU)	5,276	15.55%	33,926	9,956	48.19%
2022	N23 Penggaram	Gan Peck Cheng (DAP)	18,208	53.67%	Zahari Osman (IND)	2,190	6.46%	33,926	9,956	48.19%
