= Sungai Punggor =

Sungai Punggor Mukim Sungai Punggor
- Mukim
- Sungai Punggor in Batu Pahat District

- Location within Johor
- Coordinates: 1°41′42″N 103°06′16″E
- Country: Malaysia
- State: Johor
- District: Batu Pahat

Population (2010)
  - Total: 10,417
- Time zone: UTC+8 (MST)

Mukim Sungai Punggor or Sungai Punggur (also known as Mukim 11) is a mukim (Malay for subdistrict) located in Batu Pahat District in Johor, Malaysia. Batu Pahat District was divided into 14 mukims, each of which encompasses several villages. The population was 10,417 in 2010. The majority ethics of the population in the Sungai Punggor is Malay (8,887). The nearby towns is Bandar Rengit (east) and Bandar Senggarang (west).

== Villages ==
Sungai Punggor comprises the following populated village, among them are:

- Kampung Sungai Dulang Laut
- Kampung Sungai Dulang
- Kampung Parit Sri Bahrom Laut
- Kampung Parit Sri Bahrom.
- Kampung Parit Lapis Sri Bahrom
- Kampung Parit Sri Bahrom Darat
- Kampung Parit Sri Bahrom Tambak
- Kampung Parit Empat
- Kampung Parit Juraimi
- Kampung Sungai Tongkang
- Kampung Sungai Tongkang Darat
- Kampung Parit Perpat Laut
- Kampung Parit Perpat
- Kampung Parit Lapis Perpat
- Kampung Parit Perpat Darat
- Kampung Sungai Mengkudu
- Kampung Punggur Kecil
- Kampung Punggur Laut Timur
- Kampung Punggur Laut Barat
- Kampung Punggur Besar
- Kampung Punggur Darat
- Kampung Nelayan
- Kampung Parit Haji Abdul Rahman
- Desa Seri Rejo Sari
