= Linau, Johor =

Linau parish Linau
- Parish / Mukim
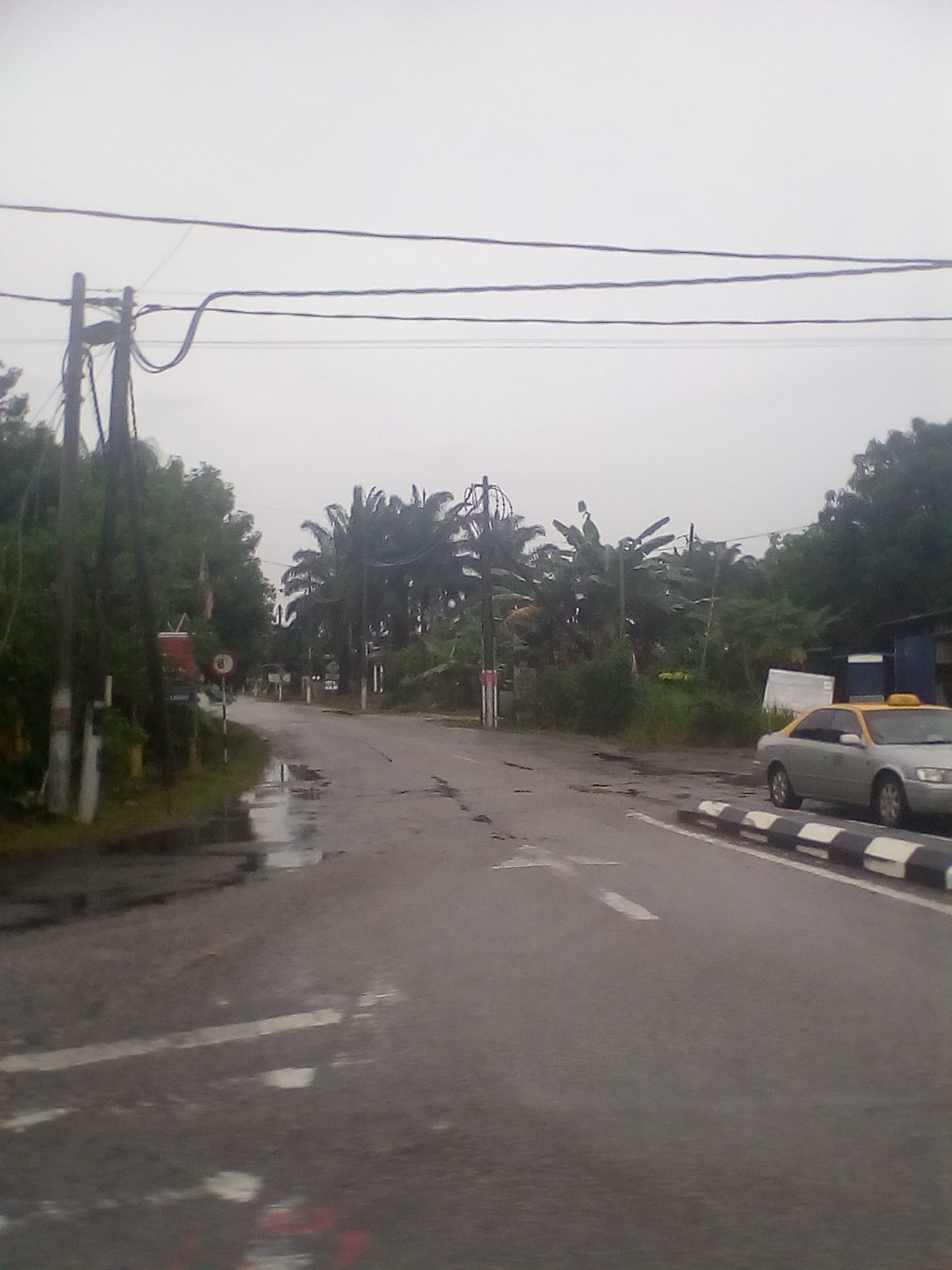
- Kampung Bindu in Linau.

- Linau in Batu Pahat District
- Country: Malaysia
- State: Johor
- District: Batu Pahat

Linau Mukim (also known as Mukim 6) is a mukim located in Batu Pahat district in Johor. Batu Pahat district is divided into 14 parishes, each of which encompasses several villages.

== Villages ==
Mukim Linau comprises the following populated village, among them are:

- Kampung Parit Banyumas
- Kampung Seri Teluk
- Kampung Parit Suratman
- Kampung Bindu
- Kampung Parit Senah
- Kampung Parit Hitam Khamis
- Kampung Parit Yob Darat
- Kampung Parit Yaani
- Kampung Parit Andih
- Kampung Parit Jambi
- Kampung Seri Bengkal
- Kampung Parit Yaani Tengah
- Kampung Seri Binjai
- Kampung Mohd Noor
- Kampung Parit Lahak
- Kampung Parit Beleman
- Kampung Parit Jabong
- Kampung Parit Kassim
