= Simpang Kanan =

Simpang Kanan Mukim Simpang Kanan
- Parish / Mukim
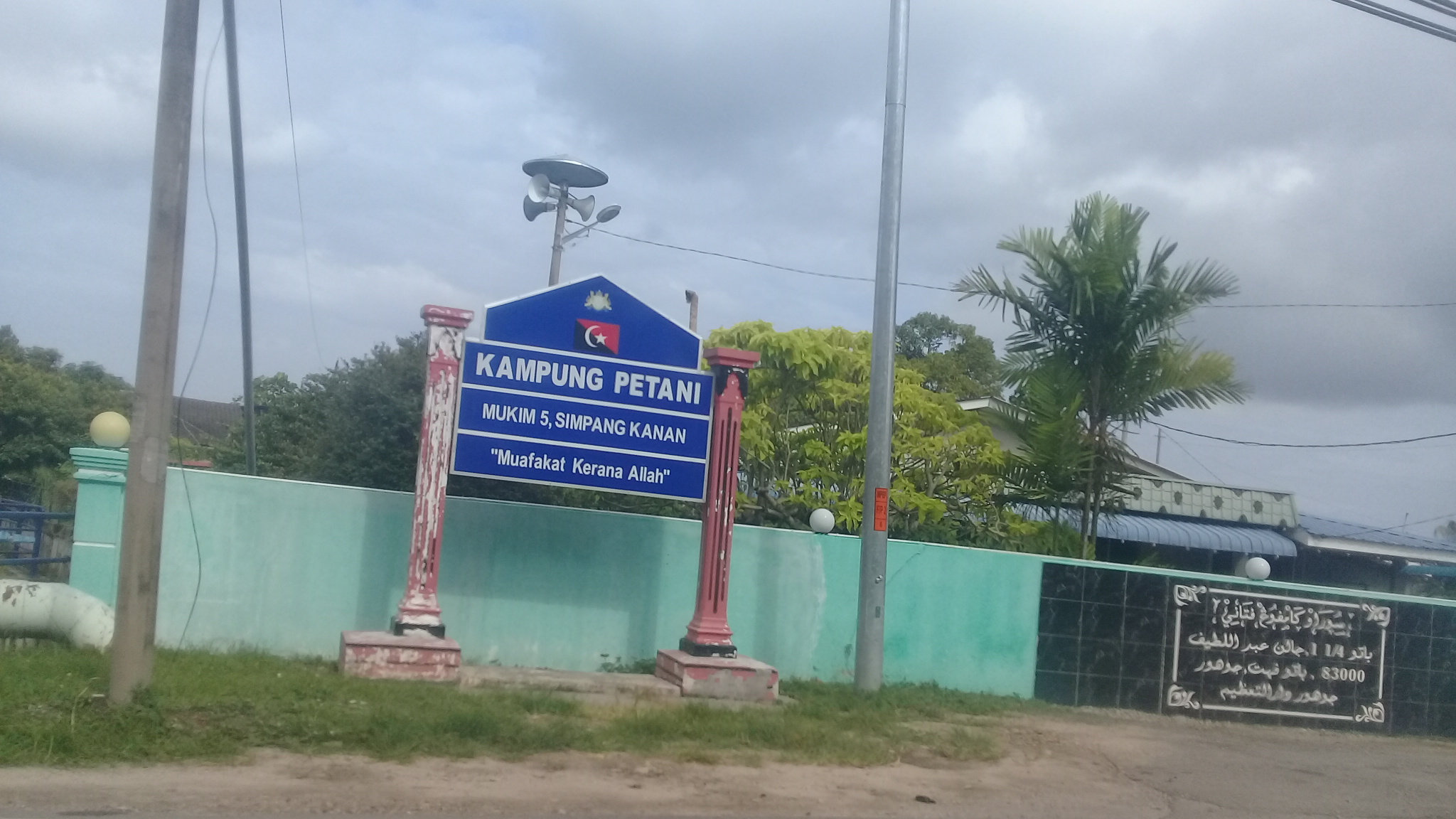
- Kampung Petani in Mukim Simpang Kanan

- Simpang Kanan in Batu Pahat District
- Country: Malaysia
- State: Johor
- District: Batu Pahat

Simpang Kanan Mukim (also known as Mukim 5) is a mukim located in Batu Pahat district in Johore. Batu Pahat district is divided into 14 parishes, each of which encompasses several villages.
