= SMK Datin Onn Jaafar =

SMKDOJ Sekolah Menengah Kebangsaan Datin Onn Jaafar
- Batu Pahat, Johor; Malaysia

Information
- Type: National School
- Established: 1 January 1978
- Enrollment: approx. 2000
- Website: http://www.smkdoj.com

Sekolah Menengah Kebangsaan Datin Onn Jaafar (SMKDOJ) is better known as DOJ or Pesta by most of the residents in Batu Pahat, and was established in early 1977. The first schooling session started on 1 January 1978.

It is located in Batu Pahat on a land area of 10 acres (4 hectares). The school began construction in early 1977 and was completed in the same year.

The school was previously named as Sekolah Rendah Bandar Penggaram. The name was later changed to Sekolah Menengah Datin Halimah in commemoration of the wife of former Menteri Besar, Johor Dato Onn Jaafar. However, the PM's wife disagreed with this and it was later changed to Sekolah Menengah Kebangsaan Datin Onn Jaafar, a name it still retains.

SMK Datin Onn Jaafar was formally opened on 1 September 1977 by former Malaysian Prime Minister, Mahathir Mohamad, when he was Minister of Education.

== See also ==
- Education in Malaysia
