= Tanjung Semberong =

Tanjung Semberong Mukim Tanjung Semberong
- Parish / Mukim
- Tanjung Sembrong in Batu Pahat District
- Country: Malaysia
- State: Johor
- District: Batu Pahat

Mukim Tanjung Semberong or Tanjung Sembrong (also known as Mukim 7) is a mukim located in the Batu Pahat district in Johor. The Batu Pahat district is divided into 14 mukims, each of which encompasses several villages.
