= Chaah Bahru =

Mukim in Batu Pahat, Johor, Malaysia

- Mukim
- Chaah Bahru in Batu Pahat District

- Location within Johor Location within Peninsular Malaysia Location within Malaysia
- Coordinates: 2.0993424°N 103.0221948°E
- Country: Malaysia
- State: Johor
- District: Batu Pahat

Chaah Bahru is a mukim in Batu Pahat District, Johor, Malaysia.

== See also ==
- Geography of Malaysia
