= Rengit =

- Town and sub-district

Other transcription(s)
  - Jawi: رڠيت
  - Chinese: 龙引
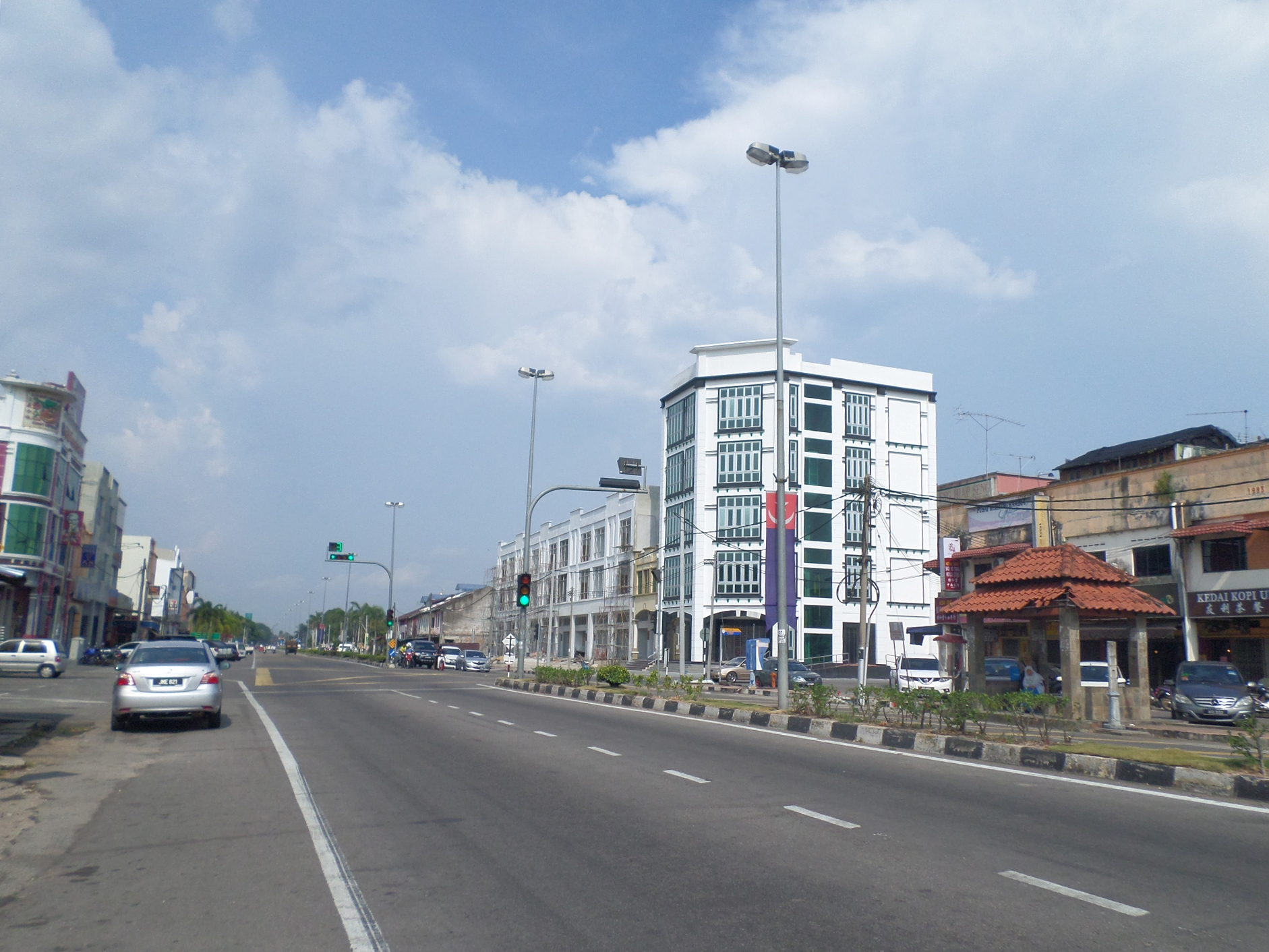

- Location in Malaysia
- Coordinates: 1°40′50″N 103°08′50″E
- Country: Malaysia
- State: Johor
- City: Batu Pahat

Government
  - Local Authority: Batu Pahat Municipal Council

Area
  - Total: 645.12 km^{2} (249.08 sq mi)
- Time zone: UTC+8 (MST)
- Postcode: 83100
- Dialling code: +607
- Police: Batu Pahat
- Fire: Batu Pahat

Rengit is a town and an autonomous sub-district in Mukim Sungai Kluang, Batu Pahat District, Johor, Malaysia. Rengit has more than 30 villages and 25 schools.

== Geography ==
Bandar Rengit in Batu Pahat District

The town spans over an area of 6.5 km^{2}. The area of Rengit sub-district is approximately 100.8 square miles or 64,512 hectares and divided into 3 mukims namely the Kampung Bahru, Sungai Punggur and Sungai Kluang District where each mukim is governed by a Chief.

== Demographic ==
The Malays are the largest ethnic group in Rengit but there is also a significant Javanese, Chinese and Indian minority as well. The people in Rengit have their own unique dialect of Johor Malay.

== Languages ==
Malay is the most widely spoken language in Rengit and is the native language of the Malays as well as the main lingua franca for inter-ethnic communications. The Chinese usually speak Hokkien and Mandarin amongst themselves while Indians spoke Tamil as their native language.

== Education ==
- SMK Tun Sardon
- SMK Rengit / SMK Permata Jaya
- S.B.R. Chong Hwa High School
- Sekolah Jenis Kebangsaan (C) Chong Hwa Rengit / Chong Hwa Rengit Primary School

== Religion ==
The majority population practice Islam, followed by Chinese folk religion (including Taoism), Buddhism and Christianity.

== Place of worship ==
- Masjid Jamek Rengit
- Tokong Sembilan Maharaja Dewa (龍引斗母宫), founded in 1912
- Rengit Zheng Long Gong Temple (龍引鎮龍宮)
- Rengit Presbyterian Church

== Notable residents ==
- Sardon Jubir, Politician
- Hasanuddin Mohd Yunus, Politician
