= Mohid Mohamed =

Yang Berbahagia Datuk Mohid Mohamed
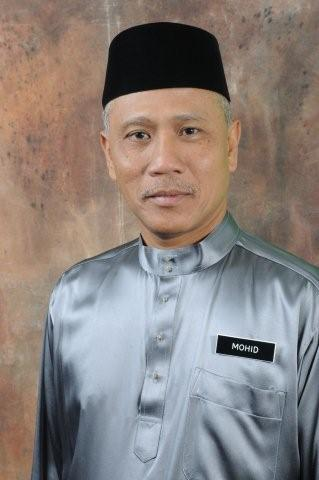
- Incumbent
- Assumed office 8 November 2010

Personal details
- Born: 19 September 1957 (age 68) Batu Pahat, Johor, Malaysia

Datuk Mohid Mohamed is the Chief Secretary for the Ministry of Youth and Sport. Previously, he was the Deputy Commissioner of Sports in the same ministry. Datuk Mohid is active in many non-governmental organization especially societies that caters youth development and sport activities.

== Personal life ==
Mohid Mohamed was born in Batu Pahat, Johor, Malaysia (19 September 1957).

== Education ==
After completing his secondary education in the late 70's Mohid Mohamed went to University Malaya and graduated with a Bachelor of Administration (Hons) and a Diploma in Education. He later went to obtain his Diploma of Public Administration from INTAN in Kuala Lumpur.

== Knighthood ==
For his valor and contribution in the field of sports and youth development, Mohid Mohamed was awarded the title Dato' (Darjah Paduka Tuanku Jaafar DPTJ) from His Majesty His Majesty the Sultan of Negeri Sembilan. The title Dato' is equivalent to the title Sir given by the British.

== Board members and association ==
He is currently the board member for Sepang International Circuit (SIC), Stadium Merdeka Council and many other association.
