= Peserai =

Peserai Mukim Peserai
- Parish / mukim
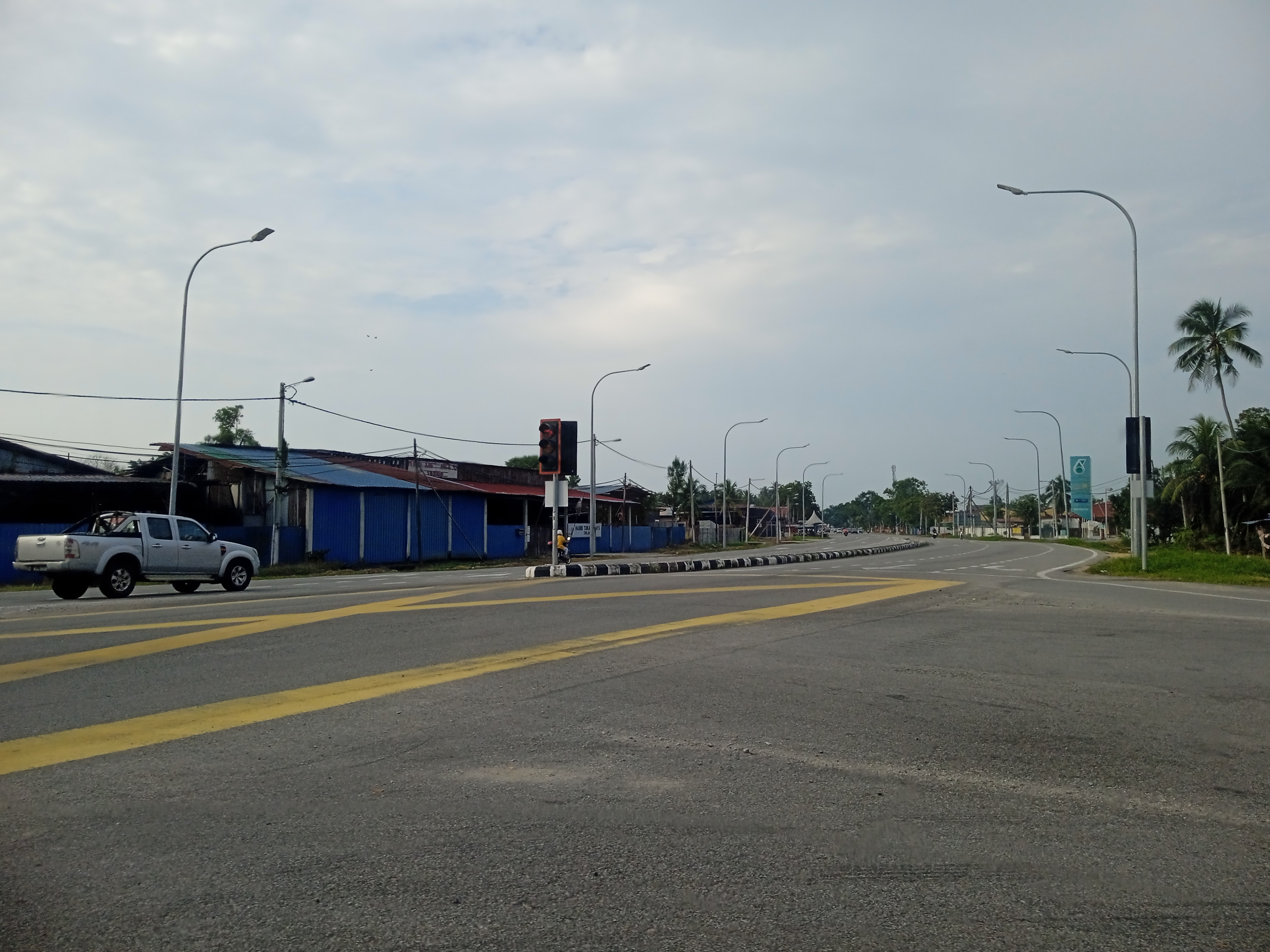
- Country: Malaysia
- State: Johor
- District: Batu Pahat

Peserai in Batu Pahat District

Peserai (also known as Mukim 3) is a mukim (administrative division) in the district of Batu Pahat in the Johor State of Malaysia.

== Administration ==
Peserai, which has five villages, constitutes one of the 14 mukims in the Batu Pahat district. The administration of the mukim is headed by a chieftain.
