= Kampung Bahru =

Kampung Bahru Mukim Kampung Bahru
- Mukim
- Kampung Bahru in Batu Pahat District

- Location within Johor
- Coordinates: 1°45′2.7832″N 103°3′38.5499″E
- Country: Malaysia
- State: Johor
- District: Batu Pahat

Population (2010)
  - Total: 11,997
- Time zone: UTC+8 (MST)

Mukim Kampung Bahru or Kampong Bahru (also known as Mukim 10) is a mukim (Malay for subdistrict) located in Batu Pahat District in Johor, Malaysia. Batu Pahat District was divided into 14 mukims, each of which encompasses several villages. The population was 11,997 in 2010. The majority ethics of the population in the Kampung Bahru is Malay (9,286).

== Villages ==
Kampung Bahru comprises the following populated village, among them are:

- Kampung Bahru
- Kampung Sungai Kalung
- Kampung Sungai Buloh
- Kampung Parit Botak
- Kampung Parit Hitam
- Kampung Parit Kalong Gantung Laut
- Kampung Parit Kalong Gantung Darat
- Kampung Parit Bakong
- Kampung Parit Hamit
- Kampung Mahang Laut
- Kampung Makmor
- Kampung Seri Menanti Laut
- Kampung Lapis Sri Dalam
- Kampung Lapis Mahang
