= Senggarang, Johor =

Senggarang
- Town

Other transcription(s)
  - Jawi: سڠڬارڠ
  - Chinese: 新加兰
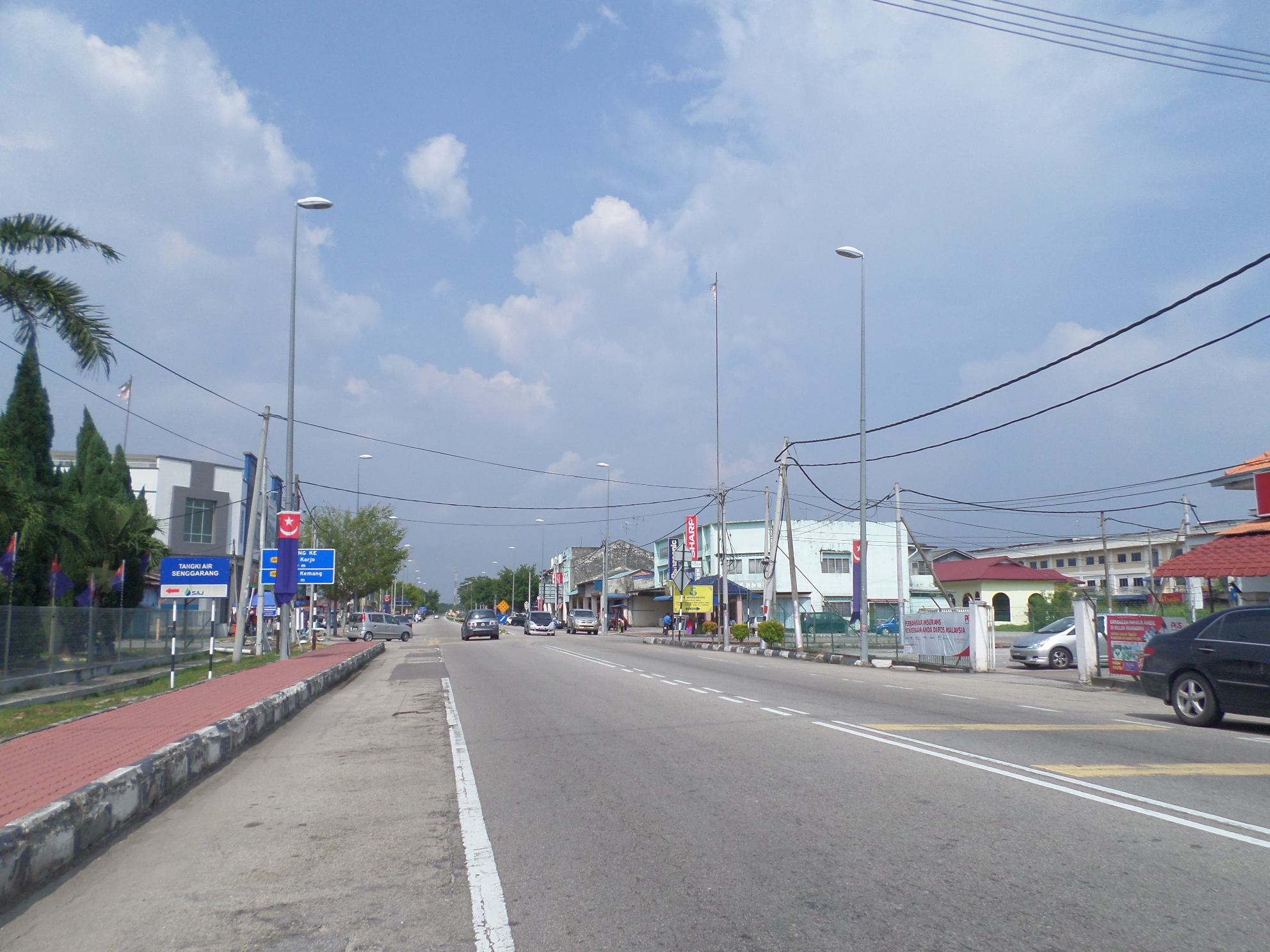

- Location in Malaysia Senggarang (Peninsular Malaysia) Senggarang (Malaysia)
- Coordinates: 1.7490338°N 103.0524954°E
- Country: Malaysia
- State: Johor
- City: Batu Pahat

Government
  - Local Authority: Majlis Perbandaran Batu Pahat
- Time zone: UTC+8 (MST)
  - Summer (DST): —
- Postcode: 83200
- Dialling code: +607
- Police: Batu Pahat
- Fire: Batu Pahat

Senggarang in Batu Pahat District

Senggarang is a town in Batu Pahat District, Johor, Malaysia. Senggarang got its name from a crocodile that is said to reside in the Senggarang river, known as "Sang Garang". Until now, it is said that the crocodile is still alive in the Senggarang River.

There is a popular Chinese Temple in the town known as Qi Tian Da Sheng Fu Temple dedicated to the Monkey God, and also celebrate the Nine Emperor Gods Festival.

Approximately 20 kilometres (12 mi) away from Bandar Penggaram, Batu Pahat, capital of Batu Pahat district.
