= Simpang Kiri =

Simpang Kiri Mukim Simpang Kiri
- Parish / Mukim
- Simpang Kiri in Batu Pahat District
- Country: Malaysia
- State: Johor
- District: Batu Pahat

Simpang Kiri Mukim is a mukim, located in Batu Pahat district, Johore. Batu Pahat district is divided into 14 mukims, each of which encompasses several villages.
