= Minyak Beku =

Mukim in Batu Pahat, Johor, Malaysia

Coordinates: 1°48′N 102°54′E

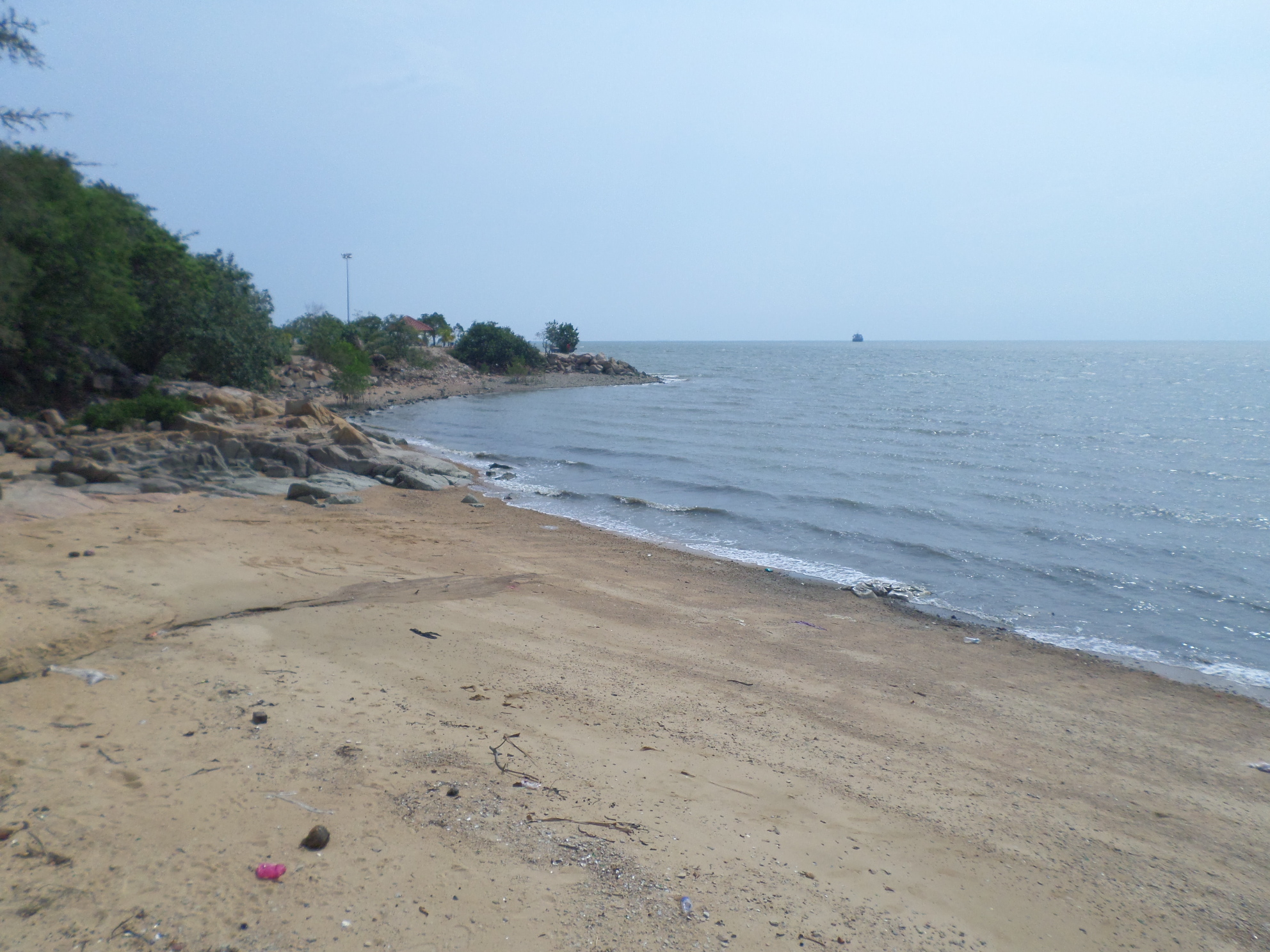
Minyak Beku Beach

Minyak Beku in Batu Pahat District

Minyak Beku is a mukim in Batu Pahat District, Johor, Malaysia.

Kampung Minyak Beku is where the famous chiseled rock is located, a big rock about ten feet in size (beside the police station). The big rock was chiselled by the Siamese (Ayudhya) to contain fresh water. It was said that the Siamese soldiers came here by boat to attack Malacca but were defeated by Tun Perak in the 15th century. The chiselled rock became famous where it later replaced the name of Bandar Penggaram to Batu Pahat.

The road from Batu Pahat town ends abruptly at Kampung Minyak Beku. A few shops here sell basic refreshments. There is a small jetty, which has a stall selling the day's catch. A fair number of fishermen with their boats are available for hire.

For a small fee, one can get a return journey to the small outcrop island of Pulau Silju, about 1 km down the coast.

A new visitors' center is being built here.

== Geography ==
The mukim spans over an area of 124 km^{2}.

== Transportation ==
The village is served by the Minyak Beku Ferry Terminal.

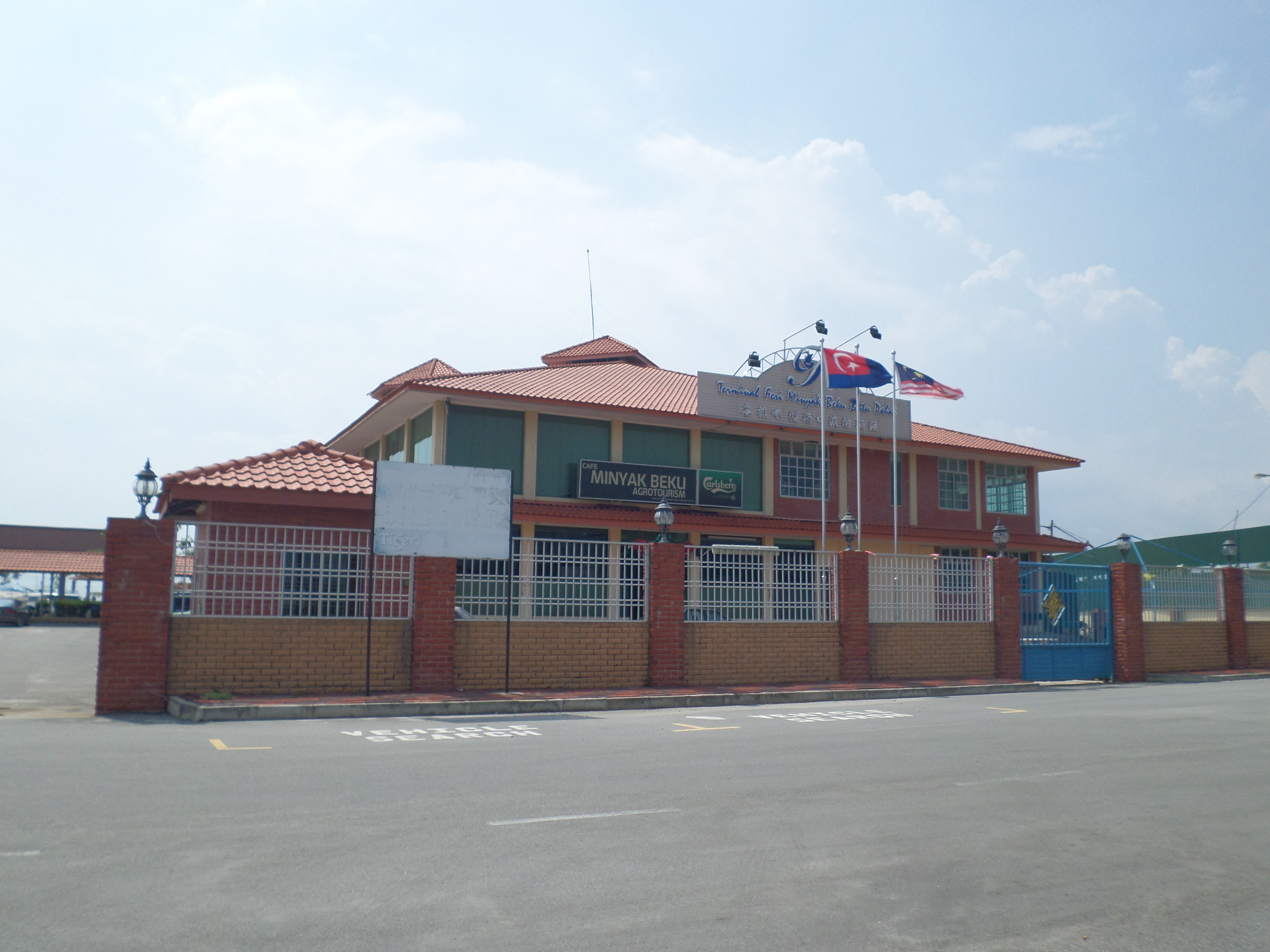
Minyak Beku Ferry Terminal

== Notable people ==
- Gan Peck Cheng (1966- ) a politician and former Member of the Johor State Legislative Assembly (MLA) for Penggaram from 2013 to 2026

== See also ==
- Batu Pahat
- Batu Pahat (town)
