= Bagan, Johor =

Bagan Mukim Bagan
- Parish / Mukim
- Bagan in Batu Pahat District
- Coordinates: 1°52′50.3105″N 102°51′49.8416″E
- Country: Malaysia
- State: Johor
- District: Batu Pahat

Bagan Mukim (also known as Mukim 2) is located in Batu Pahat district in Johor. Batu Pahat district is divided into 14 mukims, each covering several villages. It is 41.3 square km in area.
