= Penggaram =

State constituency in Johor, Malaysia

Penggaram (N23)
Johor constituency

State constituency
- Legislature: Johor State Legislative Assembly
MLA
Felicia Poh Rui Ling
PH
- Constituency created: 1984
- First contested: 1986
- Last contested: 2026

Demographics
- Population (2020): 92,223
- Electors (2026): 70,294
- Area (km²): 30

Penggaram is a state constituency in Johor, Malaysia, that is represented in the Johor State Legislative Assembly.

The state constituency was first contested in 1984 and is mandated to return a single Assemblyman to the Johor State Legislative Assembly under the first-past-the-post voting system.

== Demographics ==
As of 2020, Penggaram has a population of 92,223 people.

Ethnic breakdown of Penggaram's electorate as of 2026
1. Chinese (60.3%)
2. Malay (36.6%)
3. Indian (2.20%)
4. Other ethnicities (0.90%)

== History ==
=== Polling districts ===
According to the gazette issued on 2 July 2026, the Penggaram constituency has a total of 18 polling districts.

State constituency	Polling District	Code	Location
Penggaram (N23)	Parit Bilal	150/23/01	SA Parit Bilal; SK Parit Bilal
Penggaram (N23)	Linau	150/23/02	SA Bukit Pasir
Penggaram (N23)	Bakau Condong	150/23/03	SK Parit Lapis
Penggaram (N23)	Bukit Pasir	150/23/04	SJK (C) Chern Hwa Bukit Pasir
Penggaram (N23)	Bakau Condong Barat	150/23/05	SK Convent Batu Pahat; SMK Convent
Penggaram (N23)	Kampung Kenangan Dato' Onn	150/23/06	SA Kenangan Dato' Onn
Penggaram (N23)	Gunung Soga	150/23/07	SJK (T) Seri Pelangi Gunung Soga; SA Taman Bukit Perdana; SK Tengku Mariam
Penggaram (N23)	Kampong Merdeka Timor	150/23/08	SMK Datin Onn Jaaffar
Penggaram (N23)	Kampong Merdeka Barat	150/23/09	Taman Kanak-Kanak Dawning
Penggaram (N23)	Jalan Zabedah Barat	150/23/10	Tadika Agape
Penggaram (N23)	Jalan Abu Bakar	150/23/11	SJK (C) Ai Chun (1); SJK (C) Ai Chun (2)
Penggaram (N23)	Jalan Zabedah Timor	150/23/12	SMK (P) Temenggong Ibrahim
Penggaram (N23)	Simpang Rantai	150/23/13	SK Temenggong Ibrahim Penggaram
Penggaram (N23)	Bentara Luar	150/23/14	SMK Dato' Bentara Luar; SK Lim Poon (1)
Penggaram (N23)	Bukit Bendera	150/23/15	SMK Dato' Syed Esa; SJK (C) Hwa Jin
Penggaram (N23)	Taman Soga	150/23/16	SMK Tinggi Batu Pahat; SK Montfront
Penggaram (N23)	Kampung Istana	150/23/17	SA Kampung Istana
Penggaram (N23)	Taman Murni	150/23/18	SRA Bersepadu Batu Pahat

=== Representation history ===
Members of the Legislative Assembly for Penggaram
Assembly	No	Years	Member	Party
Constituency created from Bandar Penggaram
7th	N21	1986–1990	Chua Soi Lek (蔡细历)	BN (MCA)
8th	N21	1990–1995	Chua Soi Lek (蔡细历)	BN (MCA)
9th	N21	1995–1999	Chua Soi Lek (蔡细历)	BN (MCA)
10th	N21	1999–2004	Chua Soi Lek (蔡细历)	BN (MCA)
11th	N23	2004–2008	Koh Chee Chai (高志財)	BN (MCA)
12th	N23	2008–2013	Koh Chee Chai (高志財)	BN (MCA)
13th	N23	2013–2018	Gan Peck Cheng (颜碧贞)	PR (DAP)
14th	N23	2018-2022	Gan Peck Cheng (颜碧贞)	PH (DAP)
15th	N23	2022–2026	Gan Peck Cheng (颜碧贞)	PH (DAP)
16th	N23	2026-present	Felicia Poh Hui Ling (傅睿琳）	PH (DAP)

== Election results ==
Johor state election, 2026: Penggaram
Party	Candidate	Votes	%	∆%
PH	Felicia Poh Rui Ling	24,522	54.61	▲0.94
BN	Boo Chin Leong	20,385	45.39	▲21.07
Total valid votes		44,907	100.00	
Total rejected ballots		523		
Unreturned ballots		67		
Turnout		45,497	64.72	▲14.03
Registered electors		70,294		
Majority		4,137	9.21	▼20.13
PH hold		Swing		

Johor state election, 2022: Penggaram
Party	Candidate	Votes	%	∆%
PH	Gan Peck Cheng	18,208	53.67	▼10.77
BN	Ter Hwa Kwong	8,252	24.32	▲1.21
PN	Ronald Sia Wee Yet	5,276	15.55	▲15.55
Independent	Zahari Osman	2,190	6.46	▲6.46
Total valid votes		33,926	100.00	
Total rejected ballots		870		
Unreturned ballots		228		
Turnout		35,024	50.69	▼34.25
Registered electors		69,092		
Majority		9,956	29.35	▼11.98
PH hold		Swing		

Johor state election, 2018: Penggaram
Party	Candidate	Votes	%	∆%
PKR	Gan Peck Cheng	26,825	64.44	▲64.44
BN	Kang Beng Kuan	9,620	23.11	▼13.84
PAS	Misran Samian	5,185	12.45	▲12.45
Total valid votes		41,630	100.00	
Total rejected ballots		420		
Unreturned ballots		207		
Turnout		42,257	84.94	▼2.33
Registered electors		49,750		
Majority		17,205	41.33	▲15.22
PKR hold		Swing		

Johor state election, 2013: Penggaram
Party	Candidate	Votes	%	∆%
DAP	Gan Peck Cheng	24,277	63.05	▲14.20
BN	King Ban Siang	14,226	36.95	▼14.20
Total valid votes		38,503	100.00	
Total rejected ballots		836		
Unreturned ballots		69		
Turnout		39,408	87.27	▲11.22
Registered electors		45,157		
Majority		10,051	26.10	▲23.80
DAP gain from BN		Swing		-

Johor state election, 2008: Penggaram
Party	Candidate	Votes	%	∆%
BN	Koh Chee Chai	12,761	51.15	▼21.79
DAP	Gan Peck Cheng	12,186	48.85	▲21.79
Total valid votes		24,947	100.00	
Total rejected ballots		1,232		
Unreturned ballots		73		
Turnout		26,252	76.05	▲1.37
Registered electors		34,519		
Majority		575	2.30	▼43.59
BN hold		Swing		

Johor state election, 2004: Penggaram
Party	Candidate	Votes	%	∆%
BN	Koh Chee Chai	16,845	72.95	▼0.95
DAP	Gan Peck Cheng	6,247	27.05	▲0.95
Total valid votes		23,092	100.00	
Total rejected ballots		1,394		
Unreturned ballots		112		
Turnout		24,598	74.68	▼0.27
Registered electors		32,938		
Majority		10,598	45.89	▼1.91
BN hold		Swing		

Johor state election, 1999: Penggaram
Party	Candidate	Votes	%	∆%
BN	Chua Soi Lek	20,809	73.90	▼2.77
DAP	Gan Peck Cheng	7,349	26.10	▲2.77
Total valid votes		28,158	100.00	
Total rejected ballots		1,345		
Unreturned ballots		49		
Turnout		29,552	74.95	▲0.98
Registered electors		39,428		
Majority		13,460	47.80	▼5.55
BN hold		Swing		

Johor state election, 1995: Penggaram
Party	Candidate	Votes	%	∆%
BN	Chua Soi Lek	20,174	76.68	▲18.84
DAP	Gan Peck Cheng	6,137	23.32	▼18.84
Total valid votes		26,311	100.00	
Total rejected ballots		1,507		
Unreturned ballots		87		
Turnout		27,905	73.97	▼0.85
Registered electors		37,726		
Majority		14,037	53.35	▲37.68
BN hold		Swing		

Johor state election, 1990: Penggaram
Party	Candidate	Votes	%	∆%
BN	Chua Soi Lek	15,161	57.84	▲3.10
DAP	Lim Hwah Beng	11,053	42.16	▲6.21
Total valid votes		26,214	100.00	
Total rejected ballots		1,523		
Unreturned ballots		0		
Turnout		27,737	74.82	▲2.72
Registered electors		37,072		
Majority		4,108	15.67	▼3.10
BN hold		Swing		

Johor state election, 1986: Penggaram
Party	Candidate	Votes	%
BN	Chua Soi Lek	11,633	54.73
DAP	Gan Ah Liong	7,643	35.96
PAS	Mohamed bin Salleh	1,447	6.81
SDP	Tan Lem Huat	532	2.50
Total valid votes		21,255	100.00
Total rejected ballots		2,453	
Unreturned ballots		0	
Turnout		23,708	72.10
Registered electors		32,884	
Majority		3,990	18.77
This was a new constituency created.
