= Chinese High School (Batu Pahat) =

Independent high school in Johor, Malaysia

- 华仁中学／華仁中學; Huá Rén Zhōng Xué

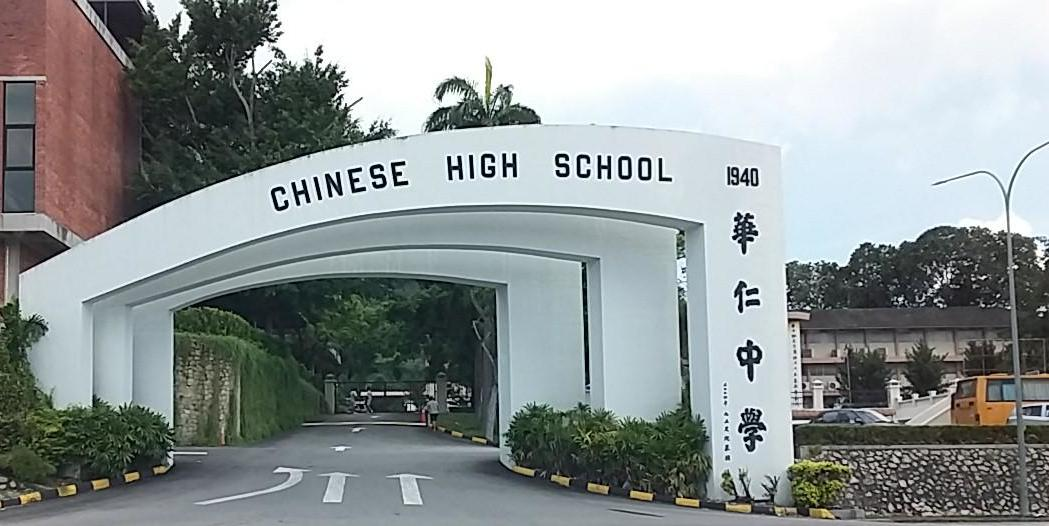
- The school gate in 2025

Location
- Batu Pahat, Johor; Malaysia; 1.83487°N 102.94811°E

Information
- Type: Chinese Independent High School
- Motto: 礼义廉耻／禮義廉恥
- Established: 25 October 1940
- Principal: Mr. Soo Boon Teong
- Grades: Junior Middle 1 - Senior Middle 3
- Gender: Co-educational
- Campus: Batu Pahat
- Accreditation: Third largest Chinese independent high school in Johor
- Medium of Language: Chinese, English, Malay
- Website: www.chsbp.edu.my

Chinese High School Batu Pahat
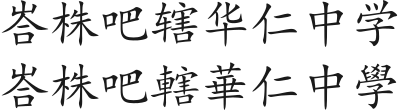
- Chinese High School Batu Pahat in Simplified Chinese (top) and Traditional Chinese character (below)
- Traditional Chinese: 峇株吧轄華仁中學
- Simplified Chinese: 峇株吧辖华仁中学
Transcriptions
Standard Mandarin
- Hanyu Pinyin: Bāzhūbāxiá Huárén Zhōngxué

The Chinese High School (simplified Chinese: 华仁中学; traditional Chinese: 華仁中學) was founded in 1940, located in Batu Pahat, Johor, Malaysia, with 2850 students as of January 2011. It was formerly known as the Overseas Chinese School (simplified Chinese: 华侨中学; traditional Chinese: 華僑中學).

The current Principal of Chinese High School is Mr. Soon Boon Teong (苏文忠) which is the former Vice Principal and Director of Academic Affairs and he serving as Principal since 1 December 2022.

== See also ==
- Chinese Independent High School
- Education in Malaysia
