= Batu Pahat (town) =

Batu Pahat Bandar Penggaram
- Municipality and district capital
- Batu Pahat Town; Bandar Batu Pahat
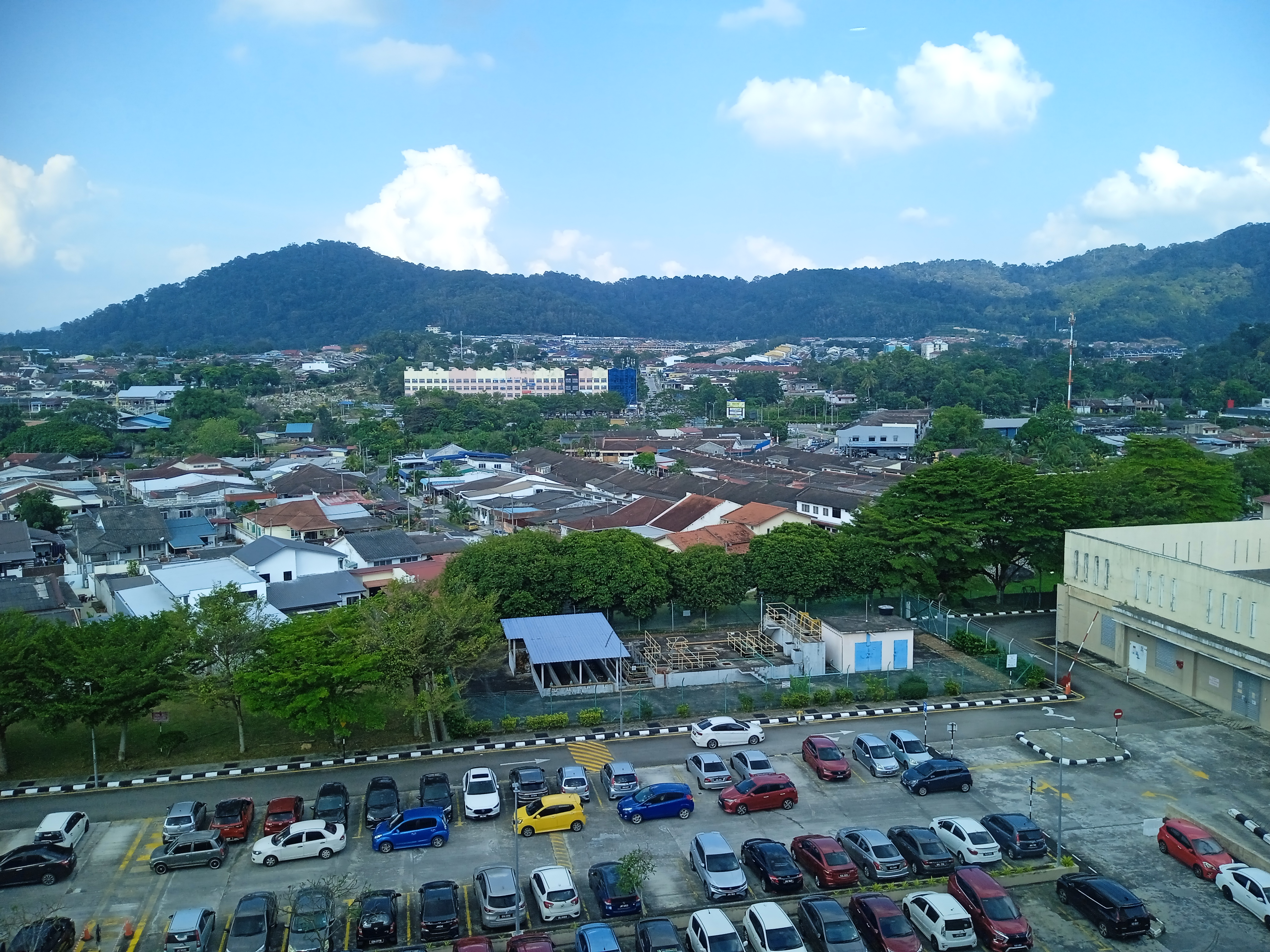
- Skyline of Batu Pahat, looking north.

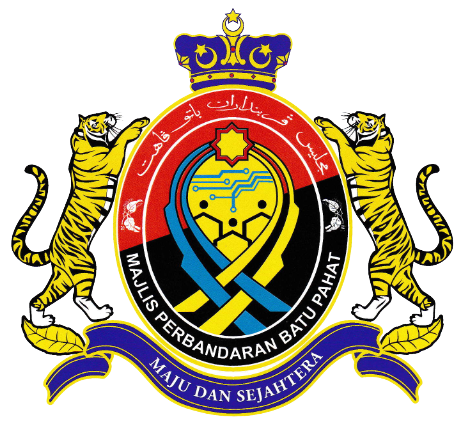
- Seal
- Nickname: BP
- Motto: Maju dan Sejahtera "Progress and Prosper" (motto of Batu Pahat Municipal Council)
- Interactive map of Batu Pahat
- Batu Pahat in Johor Batu Pahat (Malaysia) Batu Pahat (Southeast Asia) Batu Pahat (Asia)
- Coordinates: 01°51′08″N 102°56′14″E
- Country: Malaysia
- State: Johor
- District: Batu Pahat
- Administrative Areas: List: Batu Pahat; Tongkang Pechah; Parit Raja; Senggarang; Rengit; Sri Gading; Semerah; Pura Kencana; Parit Besar (Bagan); Simpang Lima; Peserai
- Township: 1894
- District Council status: 1976
- Municipality status: 2001

Government
  - Type: Municipal council
  - Body: Batu Pahat Municipal Council
  - President: Ezahar Abu Sairin

Population (2010)
  - Total: 417,458 (16th)
- Time zone: UTC+8 (MST)
  - Summer (DST): Not observed
- Postal code: 83000
- National calling code: 07-42xxxxx to 07-45xxxxx
- License plate prefix: J
- Website: www.mpbp.gov.my

Batu Pahat, also sometimes known as Bandar Penggaram or by its initials as BP, is a town and capital of Batu Pahat District, Johor, Malaysia. It lies south-east of Muar (a royal town), south-west of Kluang, north-west of Pontian and south of Segamat. The town is in Simpang Kanan parish.

As of 2009, Batu Pahat town is the 20th largest urban area in Malaysia in population. In 2006, Batu Pahat surpassed Muar to become the second largest urban area in Johor and by 2012 Batu Pahat was the 16th largest urban area in Malaysia in population. Chinese make up the majority of the population at 62% followed by Malays at 36% and Indians at 2%.

== Etymology ==
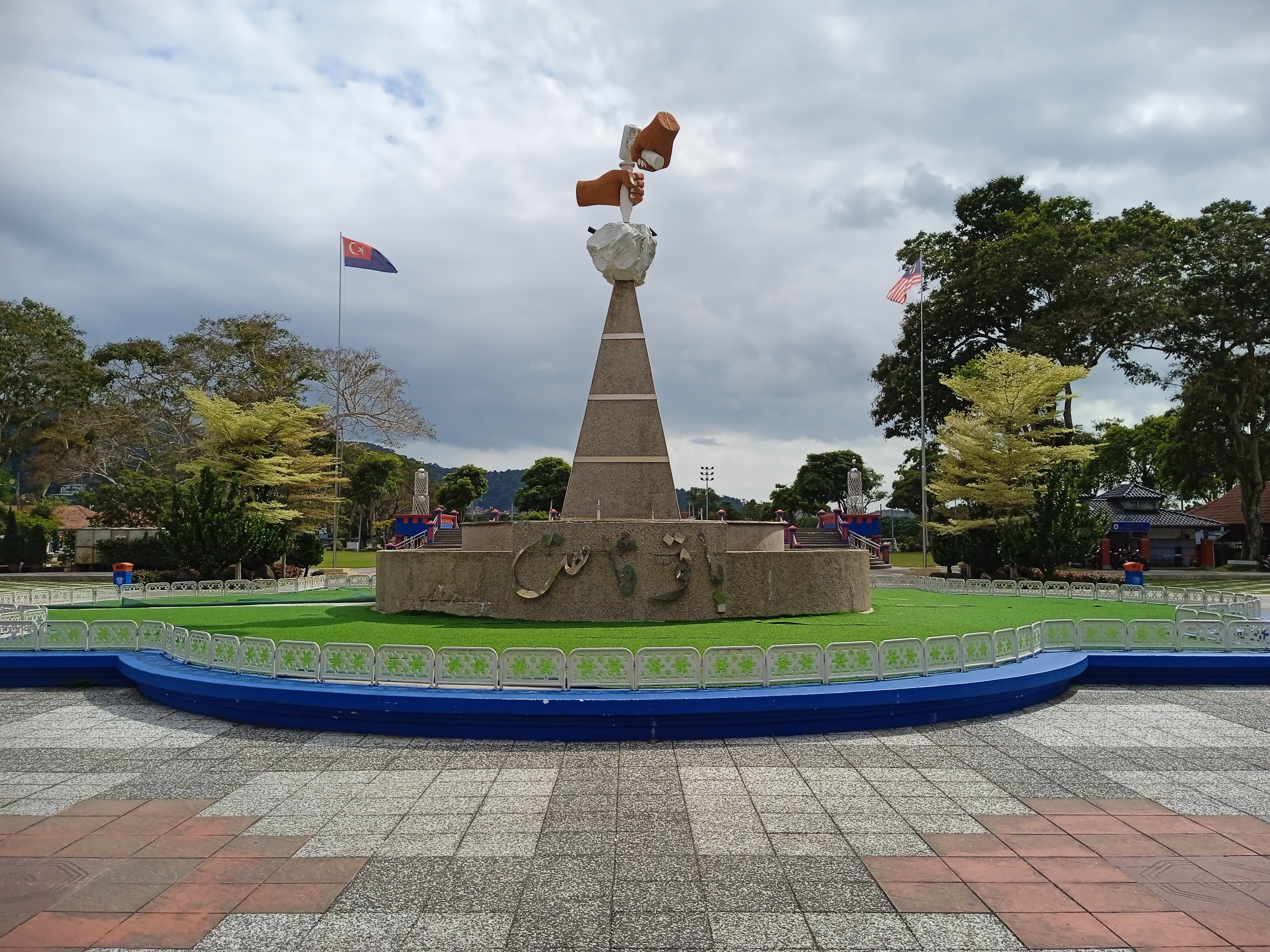
Landmark of Batu Pahat at Penggaram Square

The name Batu Pahat means "chiselled rock" in Malay. The origin of this name can be traced back to a local lore in the 1546, when the invading Siamese troops led by Admiral Awi D i Chu were chiselling rocks at a spot in the coastal village of Kampung Minyak Beku, in hope of getting fresh water during their siege on the Malacca.

== History ==
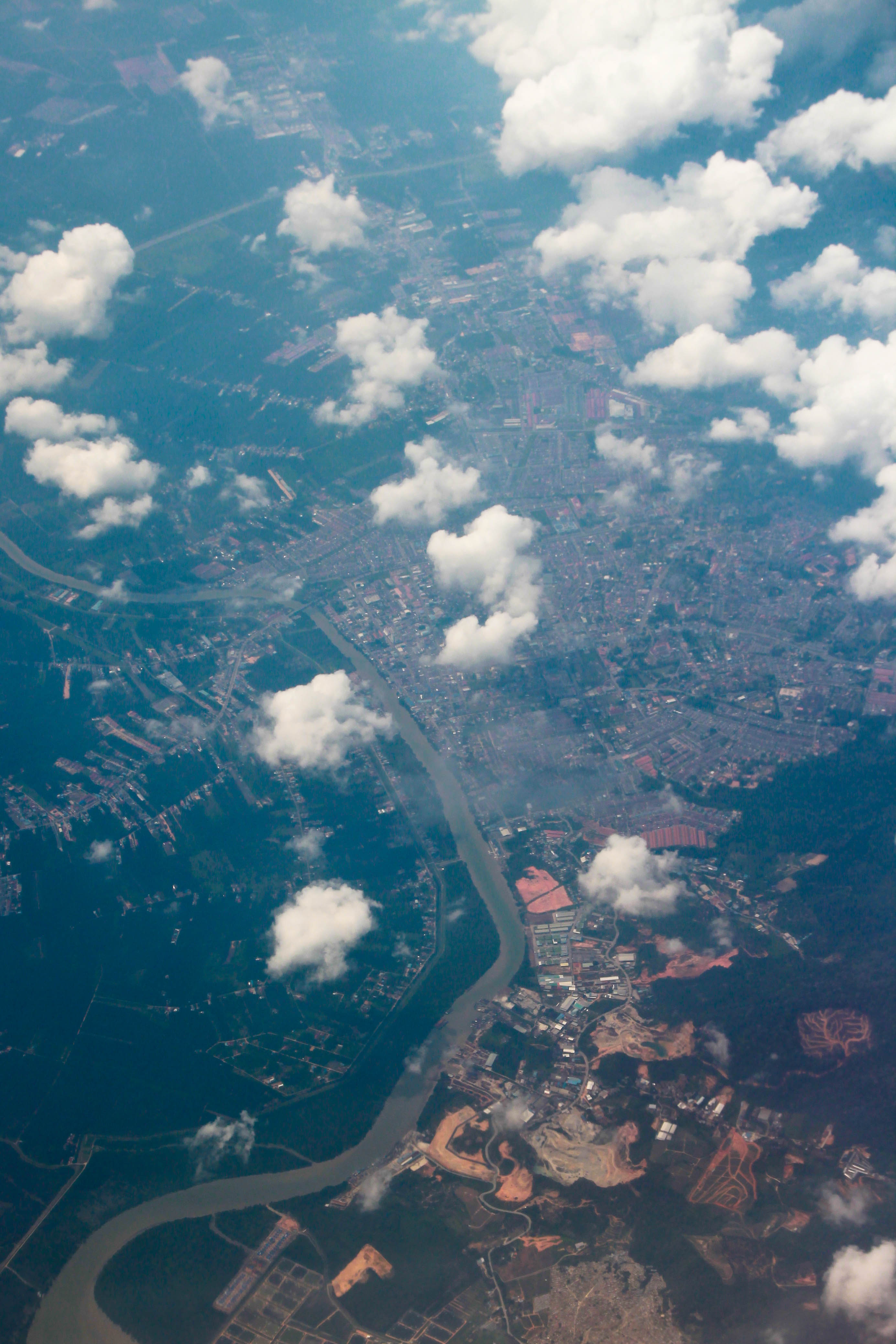
Satellite view of Batu Pahat

Batu Pahat was a remote residential area for the Johore Royal Family and village mayors. There was already a successful township nearby, Bandar Maharani that was established in 1885 by Dato' Muhamad Salleh bin Perang or popularly known as Dato' Bentara Luar. It was until in the year 1892, the local mayors (Penghulu) such as Penghulu Rahmat bin Ragam (Simpang Kanan) dan Penghulu Kitam bin Mohd. Shah (Simpang Kiri) requested audience with Sultan Abu Bakar to develop a township in Batu Pahat. They believe that Dato' Bentara Luar will once more duplicate the success of Muar known by other name, Bandar Maharani into new up and coming township. On 4 November 1892, Sultan Abu Bakar orders Dato' Bentara Luar who was then living in Kampung Senangar to come over to Johor Bahru palaces to seek for an audiences related to new township development matters.

The next month, Dato' Bentara Luar started on the Batu Pahat township development. He chooses the development places in Simpang Kanan parishes which are about 15 km away from Batu Pahat river bay. The locations is strategic as the river's berth are wide enough to let the ship passing thru as well as the construction of docks will facilitate the trading in that areas. On 2 December 1892, the fakir already starts to survey the land from Mount Penggaram to the Penggaram river for the township planning purposes. Within the next year, he succeeded in building up roads, offices, courts, hospital, police stations and also homes around that area. The development is sustained by the finances support by Orang Kaya Bagan, taxes from local populaces and as well as the personal wealth of the Dato' Bentara Luar himself.

On 1 January 1894, Dato' Bentara Luar officiates the Batu Pahat opening ceremony in Bukit Bendera which are now the official residency of the Batu Pahat town administrator. In Dec. 1894, another events held to commemorates the naming of Batu Pahat into Bandar Penggaram which had taken names from Kampung Penggaram where the Penghulu Rahmat resides.

During his reign as the Government Commissioner, Dato' Bentara Luar modernised the administrative duties by appointing the administrative officers to do their duties. He also encourage the villagers to plant crops for self-sufficiency and pulls in investment from Chinese businessman to set up plantations or set up trading in Batu Pahat. This led to increases in the town council income from RM1,500 in 1894 to RM55,375 in 1910.

== Geography ==
Batu Pahat is situated at 1°51′N, 102°56′E in the state of Johor in southern Peninsular Malaysia. It is located 239 km to the south of Kuala Lumpur. The closest town to Batu Pahat is Muar, which is located 50 km to the northwest of this town. The town of Kluang is located about 52 km to the southeast. Johor Bahru, the capital of Johor, is located about 130 km to the south east of the town. 95 km to the north west is the Malaysian historical city, Melaka.

The district itself borders the district of Segamat to the north, Kluang to the east, Muar to the west and shares a border in the southeast with the district of Pontian. The coast of the Strait of Malacca lies to the south.

== Administration ==
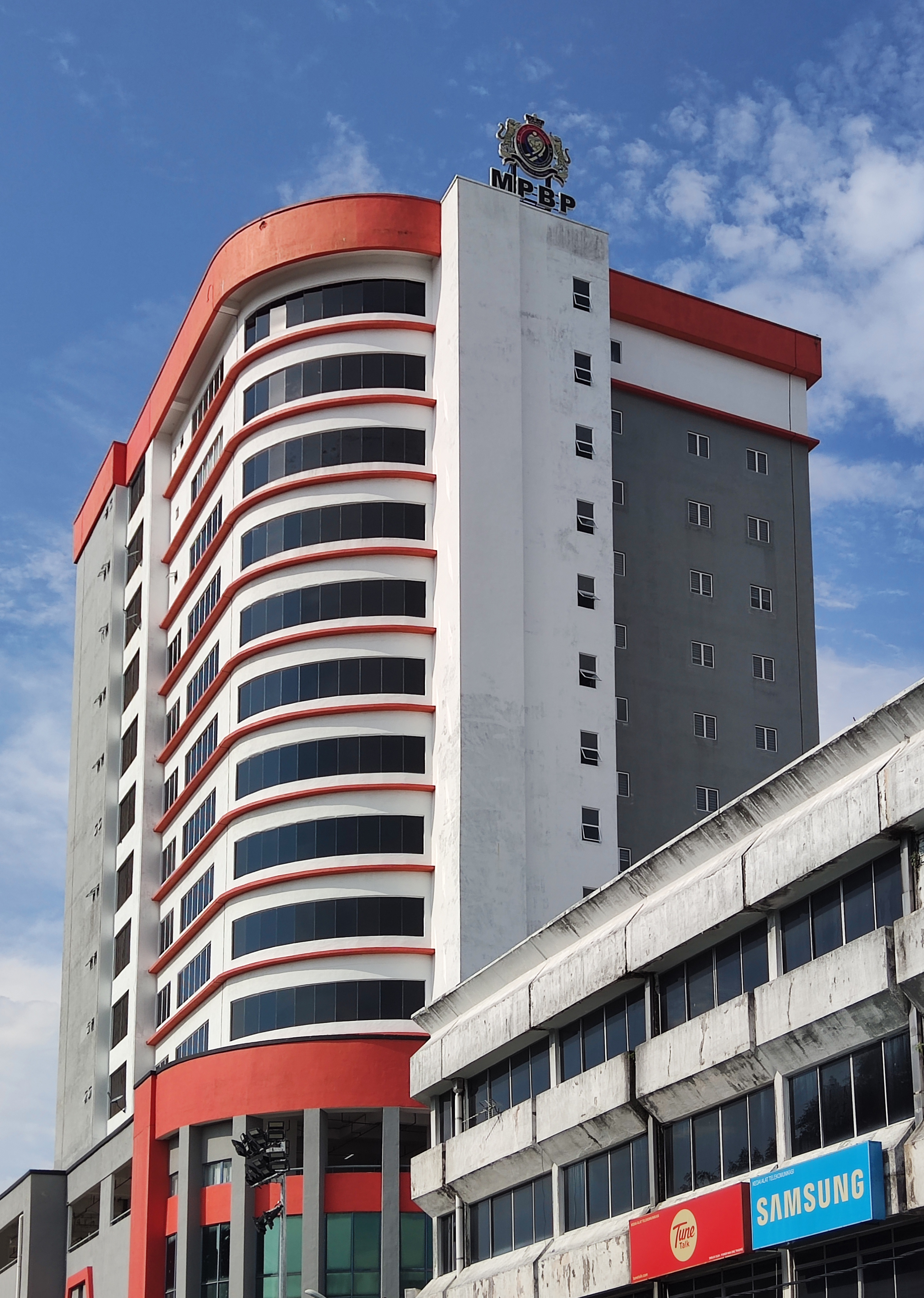
Batu Pahat Municipal Council

Batu Pahat Town and its surrounding areas are administered by Batu Pahat Municipal Council (MPBP), which was upgraded from the former Western Batu Pahat District Council.

Eastern Batu Pahat District Council, meanwhile, has been renamed to Yong Peng District Council. However, the areas administered by this council still remain within Batu Pahat District and yet to secede as a separate district.

Batu Pahat district has 525 gazetted villages (kampung-kampung) and village-clusters (kampung rangkaian) where smaller villages were annexed to their bigger immediate neighbours for the purpose of administration. The villages are represented by their village heads (ketua-ketua kampung) who answer to the subdistrict chief (Penghulu) administering the Mukim. The Mukim itself however is under the jurisdiction of the Pegawai Daerah or District Officer. The district office of Batu Pahat also has five district engineers (Jurutera Daerah) to oversee all the sub – districts.

== Demographics ==
=== Population ===
The town of Batu Pahat has a population of more than 300,000. There are more than 100,000 households with 468,058 population in this district. The most populated mukim is Simpang Kanan with more than 250,000 people and the least populated is Bagan with a population of only 4,692.

Overall district-wide population distribution based on gender are almost equal with a male population of 169,087 and female population of 166,281.

Batu Pahat town is made up of 62% Chinese, 36% Bumiputeras (mainly Malays) and 2% Indians and other minority races.

=== Languages ===
The Chinese community in Batu Pahat town is the majority ethnic group and most of them are Hokkien. They are the descendants of people migrated from southern Fujian Province (Quanzhou, Xiamen and Zhangzhou). Therefore, Hokkien or Min Nan is vernacular in this region, followed by Teochew from Chaozhou region of Guangdong province, with significant minorities of Hakka, Cantonese and Hainanese dialect speakers. Batu Pahat Chinese community usually converse in Southern Malaysia Hokkien or Mandarin due to its media reception in the area. The form of Hokkien spoken by most of the citizens of Batu Pahat is Southern Malaysia Hokkien, which is distinct from Penang Hokkien or Northern Malaysia Hokkien.

The Malays usually spoke the Johorean Malay dialect also known as the Johor-Riau dialect which was literary standard language derived from the Johor Sultanates and Malacca Sultanates. The Malays in Batu Pahat are descended from different sub ethnic groups such as Johor-Riau Malays proper, Javanese, Bugis, Banjar and Orang Kuala (the indigenous group).

The Indian community in Batu Pahat is mostly made up of ethnic Tamils which speak Tamil language with a distinctive Malaysian accent.

== Places of worship ==
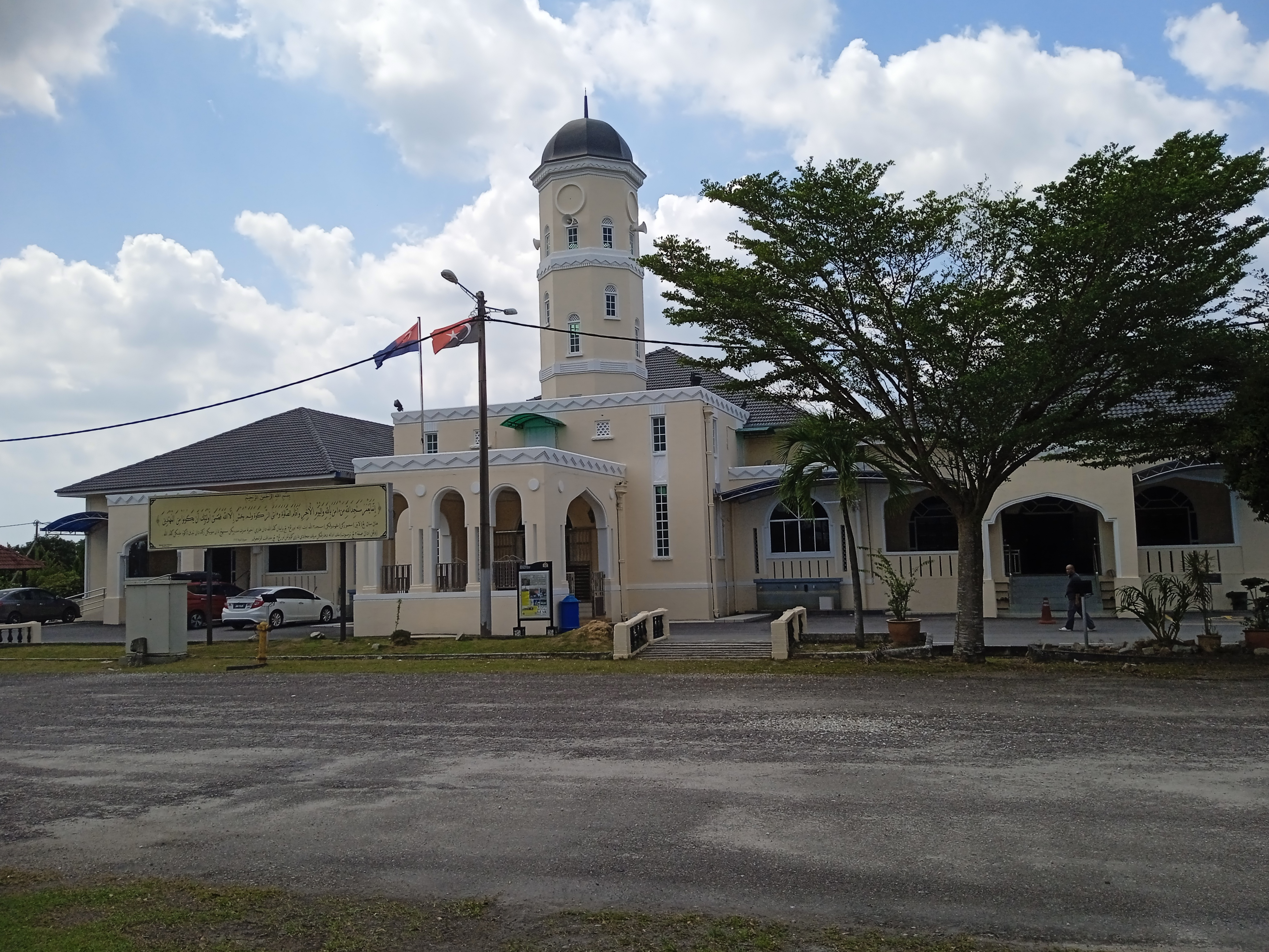
Masjid Dato Bentara Luar looking southwest

In Batu Pahat, there are several religious faiths and the major ones are Buddhism, Taoism, Confucianism, Islam, Christianity and Hinduism.

A historic mosque located in the Town of Batu Pahat is Masjid Dato Bentara Luar, built in the 1930s. Another old mosque here is Masjid Jamek Bukit Pasir Batu Pahat.

There are more than four hundred Chinese temples in Batu Pahat district and the temples have become popular tourist attractions for tourists (and devotees) from other states of Malaysia (especially tourists from Melaka, Negeri Sembilan, Selangor and Kuala Lumpur) and even Singapore during public holidays and weekends. Temples located in Segenting, Senggarang and Bukit Pasir are popular places to be visited by tourists.

Some of the prominent Temples in Batu Pahat:

- Chong Long Gong Temple (海口石文丁崇龙宫), founded in 1864
- Lim Sz Chong Su Tian Hou Temple (峇株吧辖林氏宗祠天后宫), founded in 1912
- Tian Hou Gong Temple (峇株吧辖天后宫), founded in 1913
- Pu Tuo Jing Si Temple (普陀净寺), founded in 1924
- Kian Nam Shee Temple (峇株吧辖建南寺), founded in 1950
- Si Hai Long Wang Temple (福德坛四海龙王大伯公)
- Qi Tian Da Sheng Fu Temple (新加兰路八支齐天大圣府)

== Education ==
Educational institutions in Batu Pahat include primary, secondary and tertiary education

=== Primary schools ===
There are 101 national primary schools whose medium of instruction is Malay language and 38 Chinese primary schools. Most well known is Montfort Primary School which caters to boys and Convent Girls' School which caters to girls.

=== Secondary schools ===
The best secondary schools are Sekolah Menengah Kebangsaan Dato' Bentara Luar, High School Batu Pahat, Temenggong Ibrahim Girls School, Chinese High School Batu Pahat, Sekolah Menengah Kebangsaan Tunku Aminah and Sekolah Menengah Sains Batu Pahat.

== Hospital/Medical centres ==
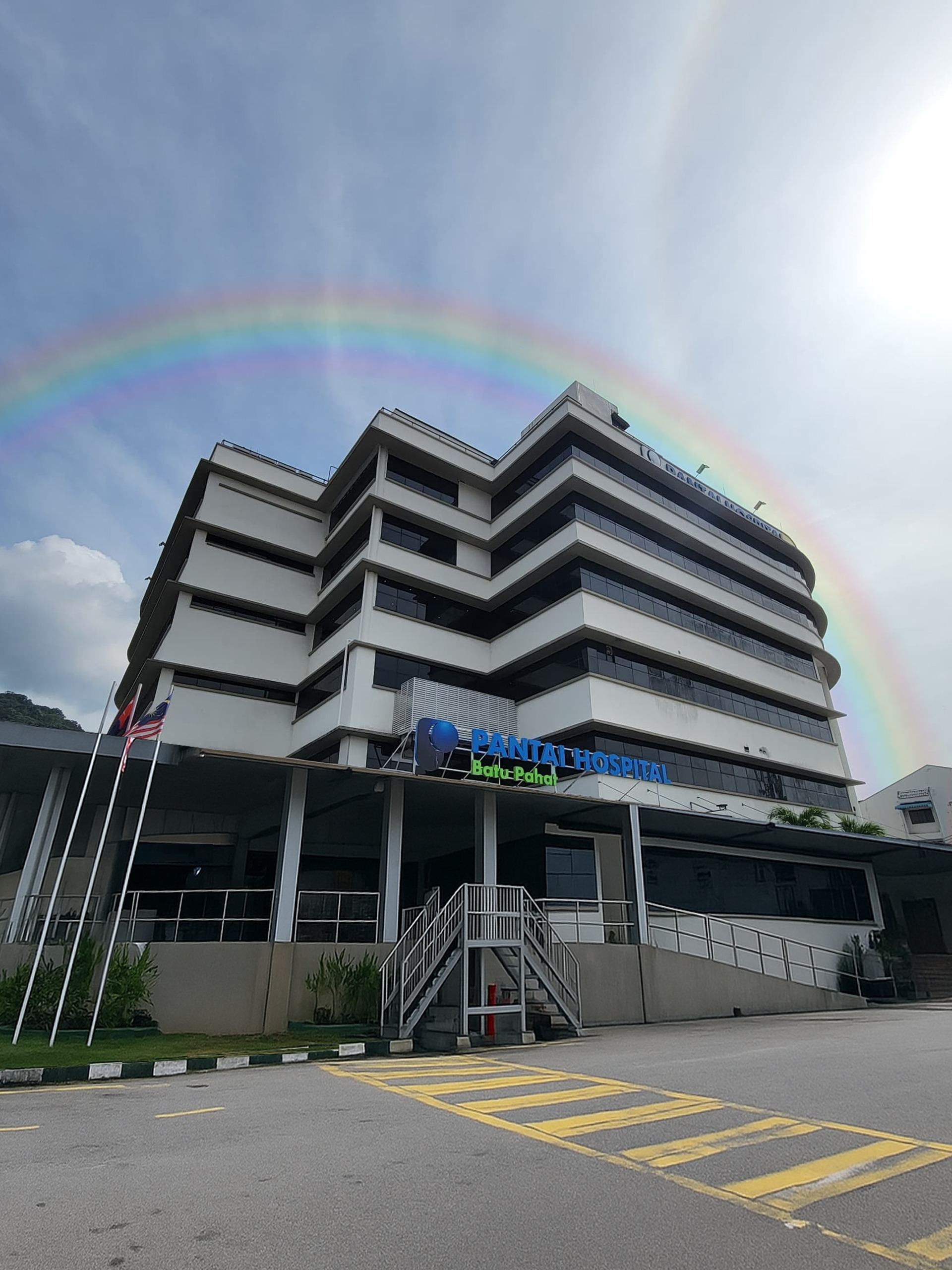
Pantai Hospital Batu Pahat (PHBP)

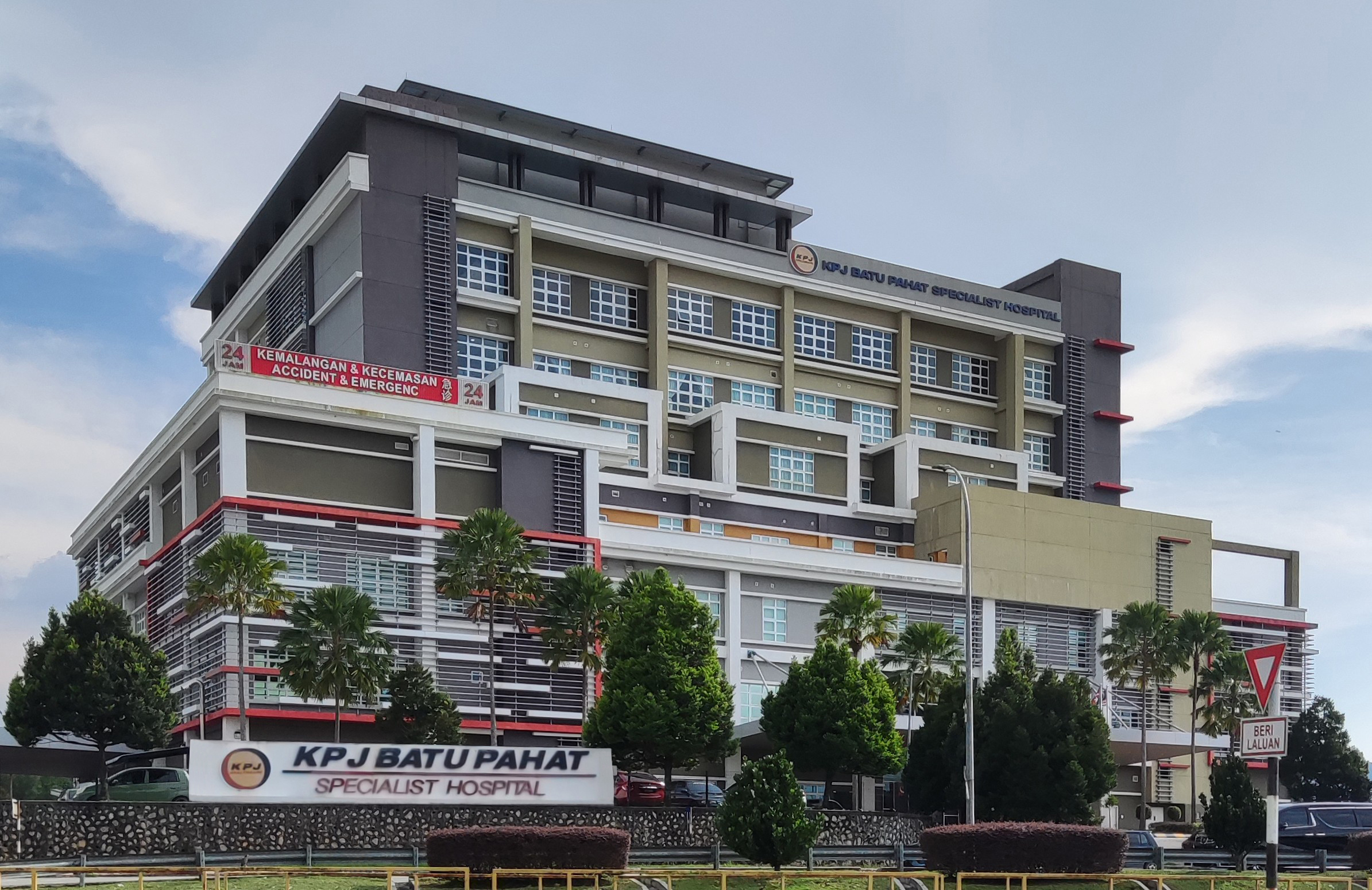
KPJ Batu Pahat Specialist Hospital

There are government owned and private owned hospital and medicare centres:

- Sultanah Nora Ismail Hospital (located at Jalan Korma, Taman Soga)
- Putra Specialist Hospital (at Jalan Peserai)
- Pantai Hospital Batu Pahat (located at Taman Koperasi Bahagia)
- Klinik Kesihatan Batu Pahat (located at Jalan Kluang)
- KPJ Hospital Batu Pahat – (located at Sri Gading)

== See also ==
- Batu Pahat Municipal Council
- Kampung Minyak Beku
- Southern Malaysia Hokkien
