= List of schools in Johor =

This is a list of schools in Johor, Malaysia.It is categorised according to the variants of schools in Malaysia, and is arranged alphabetically.

== Primary schools ==
=== National primary schools ===
- SK Ngee Heng, Johor Bahru
- SK Kota Dalam, Batu Pahat
- SK (P) Sultan Ibrahim, Johor Bahru
- SK Taman Sri Amar, Johor Bahru
- SK Majiidee Baru, Johor Bahru
- SK Convent, Batu Pahat, Johor
- SK Parit Bilal, Batu Pahat
- SK Ayer Hitam, Batu Pahat
- SK Ayer Molek, Johor Bahru
- SK Bakri Batu 2, Muar,
- SK Bandar Maharani, Muar
- SK Belokok, Pontian
- SK Bandar Uda (2)
- SK Bukit Kangkar, Ledang
- SK Bandar Seri Alam
- SK Canossian Convent, Kluang
- SK Convent, Muar
- SK Dumpar, Muar
- SK Ismail 1, Muar
- SK Ismail 2, Muar
- SK Jalan Yusof, Muar
- SK Jementah, Segamat
- SK Kopok, Pasir Gudang
- SK Kompleks UDA, Johor Bahru
- SK Kempas, Johor Bahru
- SK Kota Masai
- SK Laksamana, Kota Tinggi
- SK Larkin 1, Johor Bahru
- SK Larkin 2, Johor Bahru
- SK Nitar 2, Mersing
- SK Nusantara, Gelang Patah, Iskandar Puteri.
- SK Parit Hj. Adnan, Pontian
- SK Parit Kadir, Batu Pahat
- SK Parit Kemang, Batu Pahat
- SK Parit Raja, Batu Pahat
- SK Parit Sulaiman, Telok Kerang, Pontian
- SK Pasir Gudang (1)
- SK Pasir Gudang (2)
- SK Pasir Gudang (3)
- SK Pasir Gudang (4)
- SK Pasir Puteh
- SK Pintas Puding, Parit Raja, Batu Pahat
- SK Saint Andrew, Muar
- SK Seri Idaman, Batu Pahat
- SK Senggarang, Batu Pahat
- SK Seri Alam 2, Johor Bahru
- SK Seri Mulia, Rengit, Batu Pahat
- SK Seri Puleh, Batu Pahat
- SK Seri Tangkak, Tangkak
- SK Seri Timbul, Batu Pahat
- SK Seri Anom, Sanglang, Pontian
- SK Simpang Jeram, Muar
- SK Serkat, Pontian
- SK Sungai Boh, Pontian
- SK Sungai Bunyi, Pontian
- SK Sri Mersing
- SK Sri Sabak Uni, Parit Raja, Batu Pahat
- SK Sri Skudai
- SK St Joseph, Johor Bahru
- SK Sultan Sir Ibrahim, Kluang
- SK Sungai Abong, Muar
- SK Taman Bukit Tiram
- SK Taman Mutiara Rini 2, Skudai
- SK Taman Pasir Putih
- SK Tanjung Puteri Resort
- SK Taman Cendana
- SK Taman Johor Jaya 1
- SK Taman Johor Jaya 2
- SK Taman Johor Jaya 3
- SK Taman Johor Jaya 4
- SK Taman Johor Jaya 5
- SK Taman Rinting 1
- SK Taman Rinting 2
- SK Taman Rinting 3
- SK Perigi Acheh
- SK Taman Impian Emas
- SK Kopok
- SK Cahaya Baru
- SK Taman Bukit Indah, Iskandar Puteri
- SK Taman Perling, Johor Bahru
- SK Taman Sri Pulai, Johor Bahru
- SK Taman Sri Saujana, Kota Tinggi
- SK Taman Universiti (1), Skudai
- SK Taman Universiti (2), Skudai
- SK Taman Universiti (3), Skudai
- SK Taman Universiti (4), Skudai
- Sk Tanjung Puteri
- SK Temenggong Abdul Rahman I (STAR 1), Johor Bahru
- SK Temenggong Abdul Rahman II (STAR 2), Johor Bahru
- SK Temenggong Abdul Rahman, Segamat
- SK Temenggong Ibrahim Penggaram (SKTIP), Batu Pahat
- SK Tenglu Mersing
- SK Ulu Tiram
- SK Pengkalan Rinting, Johor Bahru
- SK Sungai Durian, Pontian
- SK Taman Kota Jaya
- SK Kg Melayu, Kluang
- SK Bandar (Lelaki), Kluang
- Sk Bandar (Perempuan), Kluang
- SK Taman Desa Jaya, Johor Bahru
- SK Masai
- SK Parit Bakar Darat Muar
- SK Taman Molek
- SK Kulai
- SK Kulai 1
- SK Taman Indahpura 1
- SK Taman Indahpura 2
- SK Taman Tampoi Utama
- SK Taman Daya 3
- SK Taman Daya 2
- SK Limpoon 1, Batu Pahat
- SK Tengku Mariam (P), Batu Pahat
- SK Pendidikan Khas, Batu Pahat
- SK Seri Puteri, Batu Pahat
- Sekolah Rendah Seri Presbyterian （博恩私立小学）, Batu Pahat

=== Chinese-type primary schools ===
- SJK (C) Ai Chun, Segamat
- SJK (C) Ai Chun (1), Batu Pahat
- SJK (C) Ai Chun (2), Batu Pahat
- SJK (C) Ai Hwa, Panchor, Muar
- SJK (C) Aik Ming, Bukit Pasir, Muar
- SJK (C) Ban Foo, Ulu Tiram
- SJK (C) Batu, Kulai
- SJK (C) Bekoh, Tangkak
- SJK (C) Bekok, Segamat
- SJK (C) Bemban, Kulai
- SJK (C) Bin Chong, Pontian
- SJK (C) Boon Lim, Parit Bulat, Muar
- SJK (C) Bukit Siput, Segamat
- SJK (C) Buloh, Batu Pahat
- SJK (C) Central Paloh
- SJK (C) Central Site
- SJK (C) Chaah
- SJK (C) Chee Tong, Masai
- SJK (C) Cheng Siu (1), Batu Pahat
- SJK (C) Cheng Siu (2), Batu Pahat
- SJK (C) Cheow Min, Pontian
- SJK (C) Chern Hwa Bukit Pasir, Batu Pahat
- SJK (C) Chin Kwang HwaYu, Parit Jawa, Muar
- SJK (C) Chien Hwa, Kampung Jawa, Pontian
- SJK (C) Chi Chih, Pontian
- SJK (C) Chi Mang, Pontian
- SJK (C) Chi Ming 1, Tangkak
- SJK (C) Chi Ming 2, Tangkak
- SJK (C) Chian Bee, Chamek
- SJK (C) Chiao Ching, Mersing
- SJK (C) Chien Chi, Plentong, Masai
- SJK (C) Chien Hwa, Pontian
- SJK (C) Chin Chiang, Renggam
- SJK (C) Chin Terh, Bakri, Muar
- SJK (C) Ching Yeh, Kulai, Johor Bahru
- SJK (C) Chong Eng, Kluang

SJK(C) Chong Hwa (1), Kluang SJK(C) Chong Hwa (2), Kluang SJK(C) Chong Hwa (3), Kluang

- SJK (C) Chong Hwa Kangkar Senangar, Batu Pahat
- SJK (C) Chong Hwa PT Kadir, Batu Pahat
- SJK (C) Chong Hwa Rengit, Batu Pahat
- SJK (C) Chong Hwa Segenting, Batu Pahat
- SJK (C) Chong Hwa Senggarang, Batu Pahat
- SJK (C) Chong Hwa SG. Ayam, Batu Pahat
- SJK (C) Chong Hwa Sri Gading, Batu Pahat
- SJK (C) Chong Hwa Sri Medan, Batu Pahat
- SJK (C) Chung Cheng, Batu Pahat
- SJK (C) Chung Hwa, Pontian
- SJK (C) Chung Hwa 1A & 1B, Muar
- SJK (C) Chung Hwa 2A & 2B, Muar
- SJK (C) Chung Hwa 3, Muar
- SJK (C) Chung Hwa Jorak, Muar
- SJK (C) Chung Hwa Presbyterian, Muar
- SJK (C) Foon Yew 1, Johor Bahru
- SJK (C) Foon Yew 2, Johor Bahru
- SJK (C) Foon Yew 3, Johor Bahru
- SJK (C) Foon Yew 4, Johor Bahru
- SJK (C) Foon Yew 5, Johor Bahru
- SJK (C) Gau San, Pontian
- SJK (C) Gogok, Pengerang
- SJK (C) Hua Min, Batu Pahat
- SJK (C) Hwa Jin, Batu Pahat
- SJK (C) Hwa Nan (华南国民型华文小学), Batu Pahat
- SJK (C) Hwa Nan, Segamat
- SJK (C) Jabi, Segamat
- SJK (C) Jagoh, Segamat
- SJK (C) Jemaluang, Mersing
- SJK (C) Jementah 1, Segamat
- SJK (C) Jementah 2, Segamat
- SJK (C) Johor Jaya
- SJK (C) Kahang, Kluang
- SJK (C) Kampung Tengah, Segamat
- SJK (C) Kangkar Bahru, Batu Pahat
- SJK (C) Karas, Segamat
- SJK (C) Kasap, Segamat
- SJK (C) Kempas Baru, Johor Bahru
- SJK (C) Ken Boon, Pontian
- SJK (C) Kepong, Bukit Kepong, Muar
- SJK (C) Kg. Gajah Kluang
- SJK (C) Kg. Hubong, Mersing
- SJK (C) Kim Kee
- SJK (C) Kong Nan, Parit Raja, Batu Pahat
- SJK (C) Kulai 1, Kulai
- SJK (C) Kulai 2, Kulai
- SJK (C) Kulai Besar, Kulai
- SJK (C) Kuo Kuang, Skudai
- SJK (C) Kuo Kuang 2, Skudai
- SJK (C) Labis, Segamat
- SJK (C) Ladang Pengkalan Bukit, Panchor, Muar
- SJK (C) Lam Lee
- SJK (C) Layang-Layang, Kluang
- SJK (C) Lee Ming, Pontian
- SJK (C) Lenga, Muar
- SJK (C) Li Chi, Segamat
- SJK (C) Li Chun, Batu Pahat
- SJK (C) Lit Terk, Niyor, Kluang
- SJK (C) Lok York, Pontian
- SJK (C) Lok Yu 1, Pontian
- SJK (C) Lok Yu 2, Pontian
- SJK (C) Lok Yu 3, Pontian
- SJK (C) Lok Yu 4, Pontian
- SJK (C) Lok Yu 6, Pontian
- SJK (C) Macap, Simpang Renggam
- SJK (C) Malayan, Batu Pahat
- SJK (C) Masai
- SJK (C) Mawai, Kota Tinggi
- SJK (C) Ming Chih, Batu Pahat
- SJK (C) Ming Terk, Johor Bahru
- SJK (C) Nam Heng Baru, Masai
- SJK (C) Nan Hwa, Bukit Kangkar, Muar
- SJK (C) Nan Mah, Pontian
- SJK (C) Nan Ya, Telok Sengat, Kota Tinggi
- SJK (C) New Kota, Kota Tinggi
- SJK (C) Ngee Heng, Johor Bahru
- SJK (C) Pa Yai, Kg Paya
- SJK (C) Pai Chee, Mersing
- SJK (C) Pai Tze, Tangkak
- SJK (C) Paloh, Kluang
- SJK (C) Panchor, Batu Pahat
- SJK (C) Pandan
- SJK (C) Peay Min, Telok Ramunia, Kota Tinggi
- SJK (C) Pei Chai, Muar
- SJK (C) Pei Cheng, Kampung Jawa, Pengerang
- SJK (C) Pei Chiao, Pontian
- SJK (C) Pei Chih, Bukit Paloh
- SJK (C) Pei Chun, Batu Pahat
- SJK (C) Pei Chun 1, Pontian
- SJK (C) Pei Chun 2, Pontian
- SJK (C) Pei Eng, Muar
- SJK (C) Pei Hwa, Johor Bahru
- SJK (C) Pei Hwa, Pontian

[* SJK (C) Pei Hwa, Kota Tinggi]

- SJK (C) Pei Hwa, Ledang
- SJK (C) Pei Hwa, Muar
- SJK (C) Pei Yang, Muar
- SJK (C) Ping Ming, Batu Pahat
- SJK (C) Ping Ming, Kluang
- SJK (C) Ping Ming, Lima Kedai, Johor Bahru
- SJK (C) Pu Nan, Muar
- SJK (C) Pu Sze, Skudai
- SJK (C) Pui Nan, Muar
- SJK (C) Pulai, Kulai, Johor Bahru
- SJK (C) Saleng, Senai
- SJK (C) San Chai, Muar
- SJK (C) San Yu, Muar
- SJK (C) Sawit, Kulai
- SJK (C) Sayong, Renggam
- SJK (C) Sedenak, Kulai
- SJK (C) Seelong, Senai
- SJK (C) Seg Hwa
- SJK (C) Senai, Senai
- SJK (C) Sengkang, Kulai
- SJK (C) Seri Lalang, Kluang
- SJK (C) Sin Hwa, Bukit Pasir, Batu Pahat
- SJK (C) Sin Hwa, Parit Sangit, Batu Pahat
- SJK (C) Sing Hwa, Muar
- SJK (C) Siu Woon, Pontian
- SJK (C) Soon Cheng, Muar
- SJK (C) South Malaya, Simpang Renggam
- SJK (C) St. Joseph, Johor Bahru
- SJK (C) Sulong
- SJK (C) Tai Sin, Pengerang
- SJK (C) Tah Kang, Segamat
- SJK (C) Tah Tong, Pontian
- SJK (C) Tambang, Segamat
- SJK (C) Tampoi
- SJK (C) Tenang, Segamat
- SJK (C) Tiram, Ulu Tiram
- SJK (C) Thai Hong
- SJK (C) Thorburn, Layang Layang
- SJK (C) Tongkang, Batu Pahat
- SJK (C) Tua Ooh, Segamat
- SJK (C) Tuan Poon, Simpang Renggam
- SJK (C) Tung Cheng, Batu Pahat
- SJK (C) Wee Sin, Muar
- SJK (C) Woon Hwa, Kulai, Johor Bahru
- SJK (C) Yani, Batu Pahat
- SJK (C) Yeong Chang, Batu Pahat
- SJK (C) Yok Eng, Muar
- SJK (C) Yong Peng (1), Batu Pahat
- SJK (C) Yong Peng (2), Batu Pahat
- SJK (C) York Chai, Batu Pahat
- SJK (C) Yu Eng, Muar
- SJK (C) Yu Hwa, Kota Tinggi
- SJK (C) Yu Jern, Bukit Pasir, Muar
- SJK (C) Yu Ming, Kluang
- SJK (C) Yu Ming, Sanglang, Pontian
- SJK (C) Yu Ming 1, Pontian
- SJK (C) Yu Ming 2, Pontian

=== Tamil-type primary schools ===
- SJK (T) Bandar Segamat, Segamat
- SJK (T) Batu Anam, Batu Anam
- SJK (T) Bekok, Bekok
- SJK (T) Cantuman Chaah, Chaah
- SJK (T) Cep. Niyor, Kluang
- SJK (T) Desa Cemerlang, Ulu Tiram
- SJK (T) Gelang Patah, Gelang Patah
- SJK (T) Jalan Bukit Rengam, Renggam
- SJK (T) Jalan Haji Manan, Kluang
- SJK (T) Jalan Khalidi, Muar
- SJK (T) Jalan Parit Ibrahim, Pontian
- SJK (T) Jalan Setesyen Paloh, Paloh
- SJK (T) Jalan Sialang, Tangkak
- SJK (T) Jalan Tajul, Kota Tinggi
- SJK (T) Jalan Yahya Awal, Johor Bahru
- SJK (T) Kahang Batu 24, Kahang
- SJK (T) Kangkar Pulai, Johor Bahru
- SJK (T) Ladang Ban Heng, Pagoh
- SJK (T) Ladang Bekoh, Tangkak
- SJK (T) Ladang Bukit Benut, Kluang
- SJK (T) Ladang Bukit Serampang, Tangkak
- SJK (T) Ladang Elaeis, Kluang
- SJK (T) Ladang Fortrose, Gemas
- SJK (T) Ladang Gomali, Batu Anam
- SJK (T) Ladang Hock Lam, Gelang Patah
- SJK (T) Ladang Kelan, Kulai
- SJK (T) Ladang Kulai Besar, Kulai
- SJK (T) Ladang Kulai Oil Palm, Kulai
- SJK (T) Ladang Labis, Labis
- SJK (T) Ladang Lambak, Kluang
- SJK (T) Ladang Lanadron, Panchor
- SJK (T) Ladang Layang, Layang-Layang
- SJK (T) Ladang Mados, Ulu Tiram
- SJK (T) Ladang Mengkibol
- SJK (T) Ladang Mount Austin, Johor Bahru
- SJK (T) Ladang Nagappa, Jementah
- SJK (T) Ladang Nam Heng, Kota Tinggi
- SJK (T) Ladang Niyor, Kluang
- SJK (T) Ladang Nordanal, Panchor
- SJK (T) Ladang Pamol, Kluang
- SJK (T) Ladang Pasak, Kota Tinggi
- SJK (T) Ladang Pelepah, Kota Tinggi
- SJK (T) Ladang Rem, Kota Tinggi
- SJK (T) Ladang Rini, Skudai
- SJK (T) Ladang Sagil, Tangkak
- SJK (T) Ladang Sedenak, Kulai
- SJK (T) Ladang Segamat, Segamat
- SJK (T) Ladang Sembrong, Layang-Layang
- SJK (T) Ladang Simpang Rengam, Renggam
- SJK (T) Ladang Southern Malay, Renggam
- SJK (T) Ladang Sungai Muar, Segamat
- SJK (T) Ladang Sungai Papan, Kota Tinggi
- SJK (T) Ladang Sungai Plentong, Johor Bahru
- SJK (T) Ladang Sungai Senarut, Batu Anam
- SJK (T) Ladang Tanah Merah, Tangkak
- SJK (T) Ladang Tangkah, Tangkak
- SJK (T) Ladang Tebrau, Johor Bahru
- SJK (T) Ladang Teluk Sengat, Kota Tinggi
- SJK (T) Ladang Temiang Renchong, Pagoh
- SJK (T) Ladang Tong Hing, Pasir Gudang
- SJK (T) Ladang Tun Dr. Ismail, Renggam
- SJK (T) Ladang Ulu Remis, Layang-Layang
- SJK (T) Ladang Ulu Tiram, Johor Bahru
- SJK (T) Ladang Voules, Segamat
- SJK (T) Ladang Yong Peng, Yong Peng
- SJK (T) Masai, Masai
- SJK (T) Mersing, Mersing
- SJK (T) Pasir Gudang, Pasir Gudang
- SJK (T) Permas Jaya, Masai
- SJK (T) Seri Pelangi, Batu Pahat
- SJK (T) Sri Gading, Batu Pahat
- SJK (T) Taman Tun Aminah, Skudai
- SJK (T) Bandar Seri Alam, Masai

=== Religious primary schools (SABK) ===
- SKa Shamsuddiniah Tangkak
- SKa Lughatul Quran Tangkak
- SA Penggaram, Batu Pahat
- SA Bukit Perdana, Batu Pahat
- SA Kampung Istana, Batu Pahat
- SA Bandar, Batu Pahat
- SA Kampung Kenangan Dato' Onn, Batu Pahat

== Secondary schools ==
=== National Daily Secondary Schools ===
School code	School name	Postcode	Area	Coordinates
JEB1001	Maktab Sultan Abu Bakar (English College Johore Bahru)	80100	Johor Bahru	1.4632°N 103.7387°E
JEA2034	SMK (FELDA) Kahang Timur	86007	Kluang	2.0841°N 103.4961°E
JEA4034	SMK (FELDA) Tenggaroh	86810	Mersing	2.0798°N 103.9471°E
JEA1042	SMK (FELDA) Ulu Tebrau	81810	Ulu Tiram	1.6312°N 103.7531°E
JEA7037	SMK (LKTP) Maokil	85300	Labis	2.2925°N 102.9663°E
JEB5025	SMK (P) Sultan Abu Bakar	84007	Muar	1.0402°N 102.5580°E
JEB1005	SMK (P) Sultan Ibrahim	80100	Johor Bahru	1.4733°N 103.7518°E
JEB0016	SMK (P) Temenggong Ibrahim	83000	Batu Pahat	1.8461°N 102.9416°E
JEA3045	SMK Adela	81900	Kota Tinggi	1.4744°N 104.1805°E
JEA3042	SMK Air Tawar	81920	Kota Tinggi	1.6745°N 104.0260°E
JEB1003	SMK Aminuddin Baki	80100	Johor Bahru	1.4782°N 103.7444°E
JEA4038	SMK Anjung Batu	86800	Mersing	2.4125°N 103.8443°E
JEA6008	SMK Ayer Baloi	82100	Ayer Baloi	1.5879°N 103.3393°E
JEA0023	SMK Banang Jaya	83000	Batu Pahat	1.7974°N 102.9624°E
JEA1048	SMK Bandar Baru Uda	81200	Johor Bahru	1.4977°N 103.7194°E
JEA3036	SMK Bandar Easter	81900	Kota Tinggi	1.7543°N 104.0768°E
JEA3038	SMK Bandar Kota Tinggi	81907	Kota Tinggi	1.7453°N 103.9049°E
JEA5037	SMK Bandar Maharani	84000	Muar	2.0730°N 102.5668°E
JEA3043	SMK Bandar Mas	81900	Kota Tinggi	1.6112°N 104.1452°E
JEA3049	SMK Bandar Penawar	81930	Kota Tinggi	1.5634°N 104.2288°E
JEA7041	SMK Bandar Putra	85000	Segamat	2.5001°N 102.8637°E
JEA8012	SMK Bandar Putra	81000	Kulai	1.6621°N 103.6315°E
JEA1063	SMK Bandar Seri Alam	81750	Masai	1.5080°N 103.8867°E
JEA2039	SMK Bandar T6	86000	Kluang	1.9554°N 103.3873°E
JEA3057	SMK Bandar Tenggara	81440	Bandar Tenggara	1.8746°N 103.6170°E
JEA3058	SMK Bandar Tenggara 2	81440	Bandar Tenggara	1.8567°N 103.6350°E
JEA1096	SMK Bandar Uda Utama	81200	Johor Bahru	1.4914°N 103.6695°E
JEA7034	SMK Bekok	86500	Bekok	2.2948°N 103.1223°E
JEE6017	SMK Benut	82200	Benut	1.6483°N 103.2589°E
JEA8015	SMK Bukit Batu	81020	Kulai	1.7375°N 103.4364°E
JEA9010	SMK Bukit Gambir	84800	Bukit Gambir	2.2180°N 102.6658°E
JEA5036	SMK Bukit Naning	84200	Muar	2.0295°N 102.7613°E
JEA5028	SMK Bukit Pasir	84300	Bukit Pasir	2.1073°N 102.6365°E
JEA7031	SMK Buluh Kasap	85010	Segamat	2.5479°N 102.7789°E
JEB2039	SMK Canossian Convent	86000	Kluang	2.0221°N 103.3055°E
JEB7031	SMK Canossian Convent	85000	Segamat	2.5154°N 102.8109°E
JEE7037	SMK Chaah	85400	Segamat	2.2495°N 103.0371°E
JEB0017	SMK Convent	83000	Batu Pahat	1.8625°N 102.9509°E
JEB5026	SMK Convent	84000	Muar	2.0407°N 102.5728°E
JEA1054	SMK Damai Jaya	81300	Johor Bahru	1.5049°N 103.6414°E
JEA0019	SMK Datin Onn Jaafar	83000	Batu Pahat	1.8575°N 102.9431°E
JEE1008	SMK Dato Abdul Rahman Yassin	81200	Johor Bahru	1.5029°N 103.7015°E
JEE2042	SMK Dato Hj Hassan Yunos	86300	Rengam	1.8863°N 103.4043°E
JEB1002	SMK Dato Jaafar	80300	Johor Bahru	1.4726°N 103.7671°E
JEA0016	SMK Dato Onn	83020	Batu Pahat	1.8530°N 102.8882°E
JEE1005	SMK Dato Penggawa Timur	81750	Masai	1.4929°N 103.8783°E
JEA0020	SMK Dato Seth	83700	Yong Peng	2.0075°N 103.0551°E
JEA0015	SMK Dato Sulaiman	83500	Batu Pahat	1.9795°N 102.8761°E
JEE2045	SMK Dato' Abd Rahman Andak	86200	Simpang Renggam	1.8250°N 103.3057°E
JEE7035	SMK Dato' Ahmad Arshad	85100	Segamat	2.5725°N 102.7103°E
JEA7032	SMK Dato' Bentara Dalam	85000	Segamat	2.4932°N 102.8419°E
JEA0010	SMK Dato' Bentara Luar	83000	Batu Pahat	1.8476°N 102.9487°E
JEA2045	SMK Dato' Ibrahim Majid	86200	Kluang	1.7925°N 103.3172°E
JEA6010	SMK Dato' Mohd. Yunos Sulaiman	81500	Pekan Nanas	1.5192°N 103.5135°E
JEA5022	SMK Dato' Sri Amar Di Raja	84000	Muar	2.0399°N 102.5790°E
JEB0019	SMK Dato' Syed Esa	83000	Batu Pahat	1.8401°N 102.9378°E
JEA1058	SMK Dato' Usman Awang	81200	Johor Bahru	1.4764°N 103.6702°E
JEB6014	SMK Dato` Ali Hj Ahmad	82000	Pontian	1.4889°N 103.4031°E
JEA6006	SMK Dato` Penggawa Barat	82000	Pontian	1.4915°N 103.4042°E
JEE0034	SMK Datuk Menteri	86100	Batu Pahat	1.9153°N 103.1780°E
JEA1065	SMK Desa Cemerlang	81800	Ulu Tiram	1.5567°N 103.8178°E
JEA5041	SMK Felcra Bukit Kepong	85300	Labis	2.3830°N 102.9171°E
JEE1004	SMK Gelang Patah	81550	Gelang Patah	1.4494°N 103.5910°E
JEA7038	SMK Gemereh	85000	Segamat	2.4934°N 102.7941°E
JEA1072	SMK Impian Emas	81300	Skudai	1.5370°N 103.6814°E
JEA8013	SMK Indahpura 1	81000	Kulai	1.6290°N 103.6150°E
JEB1006	SMK Infant Jesus Convent	80100	Johor Bahru	1.4647°N 103.7543°E
JEA2040	SMK Jalan Kota Tinggi	86000	Kluang	2.0087°N 103.3481°E
JEA2030	SMK Jalan Mengkibol	86000	Kluang	1.9978°N 103.3245°E
JEE7036	SMK Jementah	85200	Segamat	2.4449°N 102.6865°E
JEA2032	SMK Kahang	86700	Kahang	2.2224°N 103.5461°E
JEA7039	SMK Kamarul Ariffin	85300	Labis	2.3997°N 103.0309°E
JEA1100	SMK Kangkar Pulai	81300	Johor Bahru	1.5527°N 103.5786°E
JEA6011	SMK Kayu Ara Pasong	82010	Kayu Ara Pasong	1.5477°N 103.3959°E
JEA8005	SMK Kelapa Sawit	81030	Kulai	1.6795°N 103.5282°E
JEA1056	SMK Kompleks Sultan Abu Bakar	81560	Gelang Patah	1.3843°N 103.5992°E
JEA1078	SMK Kota Masai	81700	Pasir Gudang	1.4951°N 103.9255°E
JEA1092	SMK Kota Masai 2	81700	Pasir Gudang	1.4797°N 103.9572°E
JEA8006	SMK Kulai Besar	81000	Kulai	1.6449°N 103.6150°E
JEB7032	SMK Labis	85300	Labis	2.3752°N 103.0145°E
JEB3043	SMK Laksamana	81907	Kota Tinggi	1.7227°N 103.8961°E
JEA2029	SMK Layang-layang	81850	Layang-Layang	1.8165°N 103.4661°E
JEA9009	SMK Ledang	84900	Tangkak	2.2700°N 102.5272°E
JEE5030	SMK Lenga	84040	Muar	2.2468°N 102.8530°E
JEA3048	SMK Linggiu	81900	Kota Tinggi	1.8230°N 103.7248°E
JEA2035	SMK Lktp Belitong	86000	Kluang	1.9474°N 103.4743°E
JEA7036	SMK Lktp Pemanis	85007	Segamat	2.5950°N 102.9062°E
JEA3047	SMK Lokman Hakim	81900	Kota Tinggi	1.6994°N 104.1153°E
JEA1097	SMK Majidi Baru 2	81200	Johor Bahru	1.5248°N 103.7577°E
JEA1098	SMK Medini	79576	Johor Bahru	1.4373°N 103.6175°E
JEA4035	SMK Mersing	86800	Mersing	2.4537°N 103.8291°E
JEA1090	SMK Mohd Khalid	80100	Johor Bahru	1.4787°N 103.7421°E
JEB8001	SMK Munshi Abdullah	81000	Kulai	1.6638°N 103.5960°E
JEE7033	SMK Munshi Ibrahim	85300	Labis	2.3942°N 103.0169°E
JEB0018	SMK Munshi Sulaiman	83000	Batu Pahat	1.8682°N 102.9786°E
JEA1059	SMK Mutiara Rini	81300	Skudai	1.5246°N 103.6346°E
JEA4036	SMK Nitar	86807	Mersing	2.3871°N 103.7156°E
JEB7034	SMK Paduka Tuan	85000	Segamat	2.4927°N 102.8440°E
JEB4045	SMJK Pai Chee	86800	Mersing	2.4247°N 103.8423°E
JEE2044	SMK Paloh	86600	Kluang	2.1953°N 103.1921°E
JEA7035	SMK Palong Timur	85100	Batu Anam	2.7045°N 102.6850°E
JEA6009	SMK Parit Betak	82210	Benut	1.7129°N 103.2041°E
JEA9005	SMK Parit Bunga	84000	Tangkak	2.0741°N 102.5493°E
JEA1041	SMK Pasir Gudang	81700	Pasir Gudang	1.4705°N 103.9067°E
JEA1047	SMK Pasir Gudang 2	81700	Pasir Gudang	1.4706°N 103.8954°E
JEA1075	SMK Pasir Gudang 3	81700	Pasir Gudang	1.4634°N 103.9143°E
JEA1066	SMK Pasir Putih	81700	Pasir Gudang	1.4736°N 103.9373°E
JEA9012	SMJK Pei Hwa	84400	Sungai Mati	2.1471°N 102.5654°E
JEA5032	SMK Pekan Baru Muar	83600	Semerah	1.8975°N 102.7598°E
JEE6011	SMK Pekan Nenas	81500	Pekan Nanas	1.5150°N 103.5130°E
JEA3060	SMK Pengerang Utama	81620	Pengerang	1.3857°N 104.2694°E
JEA0022	SMK Penghulu Saat	83500	Parit Sulong	1.9819°N 102.8729°E
JEA1052	SMK Permas Jaya	81750	Masai	1.5103°N 103.8229°E
JEA1076	SMK Permas Jaya 2	81750	Masai	1.4945°N 103.8112°E
JEA1083	SMK Permas Jaya 3	81750	Masai	1.4889°N 103.8247°E
JEA0017	SMK Permata Jaya	83100	Batu Pahat	1.6784°N 103.1492°E
JEA9008	SMK Pesisiran Perdana	84000	Tangkak	2.0652°N 102.5493°E
JEA1070	SMK Puteri Wangsa	81800	Ulu Tiram	1.5911°N 103.8088°E
JEA5024	SMK Raja Muda	84150	Parit Jawa	1.9626°N 102.6477°E
JEA9006	SMK Sagil	84020	Sagil	2.3001°N 102.6069°E
JEB1004	SMK Saint Joseph	80350	Johor Bahru	1.4971°N 103.7410°E
JEB7030	SMJK Seg Hwa	85000	Segamat	2.5205°N 102.7998°E
JEA3046	SMK Semenchu	81900	Kota Tinggi	1.5712°N 104.0950°E
JEE0020	SMK Semerah	83600	Batu Pahat	1.8800°N 102.7845°E
JEA8001	SMK Senai	81400	Senai	1.5962°N 103.6425°E
JEA0013	SMK Senggarang	83200	Batu Pahat	1.7698°N 102.9691°E
JEA1069	SMK Seri Alam 2	81750	Masai	1.5112°N 103.8917°E
JEA3052	SMK Seri Aman	81900	Kota Tinggi	1.8228°N 103.9904°E
JEA7043	SMK Seri Bali	85400	Segamat	2.2348°N 103.0421°E
JEA0018	SMK Seri Gading	83300	Batu Pahat	1.8520°N 103.0506°E
JEA2038	SMK Seri Intan	86000	Kluang	2.0144°N 103.3050°E
JEA7040	SMK Seri Jementah	85200	Jementah	2.4503°N 102.6864°E
JEA7042	SMK Seri Kenangan	85100	Segamat	2.5692°N 102.7177°E
JEA2044	SMK Seri Kota Paloh	86600	Kluang	2.1984°N 103.2018°E
JEA1060	SMK Seri Kota Puteri	81750	Masai	1.4980°N 103.8586°E
JEA1071	SMK Seri Kota Puteri 2	81750	Johor Bahru	1.4941°N 103.8410°E
JEA2041	SMK Seri Lalang	86000	Kluang	1.9413°N 103.2041°E
JEA2048	SMK Seri Machap	86200	Simpang Renggam	1.8790°N 103.2642°E
JEA0014	SMK Seri Medan	83400	Batu Pahat	1.9888°N 102.9609°E
JEA5021	SMK Seri Menanti	84150	Muar	1.9188°N 102.6782°E
JEA2047	SMK Seri Perdana	86000	Kluang	2.0574°N 103.3119°E
JEA1050	SMK Seri Perling	81200	Johor Bahru	1.4836°N 103.6842°E
JEA3059	SMK Seri Pinang	81440	Bandar Tenggara	1.8448°N 103.6282°E
JEA1099	SMK Seri Pulai Perdana	81300	Johor Bahru	1.5597°N 103.6096°E
JEA2043	SMK Seri Sembrong	86000	Kluang	2.0952°N 103.3848°E
JEA9007	SMK Seri Tangkak	84900	Tangkak	2.2868°N 102.5617°E
JEA2037	SMK Simpang Rengam	86200	Simpang Renggam	1.8125°N 103.3219°E
JEA1006	SMK Skudai	81300	Skudai	1.5466°N 103.6540°E
JEA6007	SMK Sri Kukup	82300	Kukup	1.3430°N 103.4617°E
JEB4044	SMK Sri Mersing	86807	Mersing	2.4303°N 103.8432°E
JEB5024	SMK Sri Muar	84007	Muar	2.0425°N 102.5624°E
JEB6012	SMK Sri Perhentian	82000	Pontian	1.5055°N 103.3838°E
JEA1005	SMK Sri Rahmat	81200	Johor Bahru	1.5073°N 103.6939°E
JEA6005	SMK Sri Tanjung	82200	Benut	1.6508°N 103.2595°E
JEA1004	SMK Sri Tebrau	80050	Johor Bahru	1.4859°N 103.7748°E
JEB5022	SMK St Andrew	84007	Muar	2.0502°N 102.5776°E
JEA2033	SMK Sultan Abdul Jalil	86000	Kluang	2.0510°N 103.3468°E
JEA3056	SMK Sultan Alauddin	81450	Kulai	1.7653°N 103.7081°E
JEE5027	SMK Sultan Alauddin Riayat Shah 1	84600	Muar	2.1537°N 102.7766°E
JEE8001	SMK Sultan Ibrahim	81000	Kulai	1.6514°N 103.6044°E
JEA1001	SMK Sultan Ismail	80100	Johor Bahru	1.4787°N 103.7445°E
JEB1007	SMK Sultanah Engku Tun Aminah	80100	Johor Bahru	1.4651°N 103.7416°E
JEA5039	SMK Sungai Abong	84000	Muar	2.0652°N 102.5956°E
JEA1094	SMK Sungai Tiram	81800	Ulu Tiram	1.5901°N 103.8593°E
JEA0025	SMK Suria Perdana	86400	Batu Pahat	1.8829°N 103.1513°E
JEA1087	SMK Taman Bukit Indah	81200	Johor Bahru	1.4806°N 103.6426°E
JEA1095	SMK Taman Damansara Aliff	81200	Johor Bahru	1.5154°N 103.7258°E
JEA1053	SMK Taman Daya	81100	Johor Bahru	1.5529°N 103.7534°E
JEA1074	SMK Taman Daya 2	81100	Johor Bahru	1.5659°N 103.7634°E
JEA1057	SMK Taman Desa Jaya	81100	Johor Bahru	1.5526°N 103.8111°E
JEA1077	SMK Taman Desa Skudai	81300	Skudai	1.5400°N 103.6354°E
JEA1080	SMK Taman Desa Tebrau	81100	Johor Bahru	1.5607°N 103.7934°E
JEA1045	SMK Taman Johor Jaya (1)	81100	Johor Bahru	1.5372°N 103.7960°E
JEA1051	SMK Taman Johor Jaya 2	81100	Johor Bahru	1.5400°N 103.8127°E
JEA2036	SMK Taman Kluang Barat	86000	Kluang	2.0110°N 103.2899°E
JEA3053	SMK Taman Kota Jaya	81900	Kota Tinggi	1.7431°N 103.8903°E
JEA8007	SMK Taman Kota Kulai	81000	Kulai	1.6547°N 103.5758°E
JEA1073	SMK Taman Megah Ria	81750	Johor Bahru	1.4889°N 103.8506°E
JEA1067	SMK Taman Molek	81100	Johor Bahru	1.5237°N 103.7820°E
JEA1068	SMK Taman Mount Austin	81100	Johor Bahru	1.5548°N 103.7803°E
JEA1085	SMK Taman Mutiara Rini 2	81300	Skudai	1.5216°N 103.6504°E
JEA1093	SMK Taman Nusa Damai	81700	Pasir Gudang	1.4987°N 103.8996°E
JEA1086	SMK Taman Nusa Jaya	81550	Gelang Patah	1.4687°N 103.5820°E
JEA1044	SMK Taman Pelangi	80400	Johor Bahru	1.4757°N 103.7740°E
JEA1081	SMK Taman Pelangi Indah	81800	Ulu Tiram	1.5720°N 103.7954°E
JEA8011	SMK Taman Putri	81000	Kulai	1.6622°N 103.5750°E
JEA1064	SMK Taman Rinting 2	81750	Masai	1.4888°N 103.8643°E
JEA1101	SMK Taman Scientex	81700	Pasir Gudang	1.5118°N 103.9133°E
JEA1062	SMK Taman Selesa Jaya	81300	Skudai	1.4890°N 103.6353°E
JEA1084	SMK Taman Selesa Jaya 2	81300	Skudai	1.4954°N 103.6333°E
JEA2042	SMK Taman Seri Kluang	86000	Kluang	1.0282°N 103.2969°E
JEA3055	SMK Taman Seri Saujana	81900	Kota Tinggi	1.6656°N 103.8607°E
JEA1088	SMK Taman Sutera	81300	Skudai	1.5222°N 103.6685°E
JEA1046	SMK Taman Tun Aminah	81300	Johor Bahru	1.5129°N 103.6583°E
JEA1049	SMK Taman Universiti	81300	Skudai	1.5278°N 103.6159°E
JEA1061	SMK Taman Universiti 2	81300	Skudai	1.5338°N 103.6319°E
JEA4037	SMK Tan Sri Abdul Kadir	86810	Mersing	2.1553°N 103.9123°E
JEA3039	SMK Tan Sri Jaafar Albar	81910	Kota Tinggi	1.9263°N 104.1077°E
JEA1055	SMK Tan Sri Mohamed Rahmat	81200	Johor Bahru	1.5385°N 103.7113°E
JEA6012	SMK Tan Sri Osman Mohd Sa'at	82000	Pontian	1.4947°N 103.4344°E
JEA1043	SMK Tanjung Adang	81560	Gelang Patah	1.3555°N 103.5657°E
JEE3038	SMK Tanjung Datuk	81600	Pengerang	1.3488°N 104.1895°E
JEA3054	SMK Tanjung Pengelih	81600	Pengerang	1.3661°N 104.1060°E
JEA1002	SMK Tasek Utara	80350	Johor Bahru	1.4944°N 103.7292°E
JEA1079	SMK Tasek Utara 2	80350	Johor Bahru	1.4988°N 103.7264°E
JEE6009	SMK Telok Kerang	82020	Telok Kerang	1.4172°N 103.4282°E
JEA7033	SMK Tenang Stesen	85030	Segamat	2.4691°N 102.9569°E
JEB2038	SMK Tengku Aris Bendahara	86000	Kluang	2.0519°N 103.3466°E
JEE5023	SMK Tengku Mahkota	84000	Muar	2.0111°N 102.5999°E
JEA9001	SMK Tengku Mahmud Iskandar	84400	Tangkak	2.1550°N 102.5730°E
JEA9002	SMK Tengku Temenggong Ahmad	84710	Kundang Ulu	2.2336°N 102.7665°E
JEA1089	SMK Tg Puteri Resort	81700	Pasir Gudang	1.4584°N 103.9381°E
JEB0015	SMK Tinggi Batu Pahat (Batu Pahat High School)	83000	Batu Pahat	1.8425°N 102.9334°E
JEB2037	SMK Tinggi Kluang (Kluang High School)	86000	Kluang	2.0300°N 103.3155°E
JEB7029	SMK Tinggi Segamat (Segamat High School)	85000	Segamat	2.5160°N 102.8145°E
JEA0011	SMK Tun Aminah	83007	Batu Pahat	1.8687°N 102.9799°E
JEA5035	SMK Tun Dr Ismail	84200	Muar	2.0391°N 102.6559°E
JEA1082	SMK Tun Fatimah Hashim	81100	Johor Bahru	1.5655°N 103.7543°E
JEA3037	SMK Tun Habab	81900	Kota Tinggi	1.7226°N 103.8964°E
JEA2031	SMK Tun Hussein Onn	86000	Kluang	2.0238°N 103.3004°E
JEE0019	SMK Tun Ismail	86400	Parit Raja	1.8678°N 103.1125°E
JEA9003	SMK Tun Mamat	84900	Tangkak	1.2791°N 102.5484°E
JEA5023	SMK Tun Perak	84000	Muar	2.0752°N 102.5786°E
JEE0018	SMK Tun Sardon	83100	Batu Pahat	1.6815°N 103.1485°E
JEA9011	SMK Tun Sri Lanang	85210	Jementah	2.3392°N 102.7883°E
JEE5031	SMK Tun Sulaiman Ninam Shah	84007	Muar	2.0371°N 102.5546°E
JEA1003	SMK Tun Syed Nasir Ismail	81100	Johor Bahru	1.5102°N 103.7644°E
JEA8002	SMK Tunku Abdul Rahmam Putra	81000	Kulai	1.6626°N 103.5941°E
JEA0012	SMK Tunku Mahmood Iskandar	83200	Senggarang	1.7585°N 103.1076°E
JEE0041	SMK Tunku Putra	83010	Batu Pahat	1.9455°N 102.9583°E
JEE1011	SMK Ulu Tiram	81800	Ulu Tiram	1.6030°N 103.8177°E
JEE4036	SMK Ungku Husin	86900	Endau	2.6476°N 103.6308°E
JEE0040	SMK Yong Peng	83700	Yong Peng	2.0199°N 103.0612°E
JEB5021	Sekolah Tinggi Muar (Muar High School)	84000	Muar	2.0446°N 102.5613°E

== Private schools ==
=== Chinese independent high schools ===
- Chinese High School, Batu Pahat
- Chong Hwa High School, Kluang
- Chong Hwa High School S.B.R.
- Chung Hwa High School, Muar
- Foon Yew High School, Johor Bahru
- Foon Yew High School, Kulai
- Foon Yew High School, Bandar seri Alam
- Pei Chun Independent High School
- Pei Hwa High School
- Yong Peng High School

=== International schools ===
- 100 Lambs International School, Johor Bahru
- Austin Heights International School, Johor Bahru, Johor
- Crescendo-HELP International School, Johor Bahru, Johor
- Fairview International School, Johor Bahru, Johor
- Invictus International School, Iskandar Puteri, Johor
- Marlborough College Malaysia, Iskandar Puteri, Johor Bahru
- New Bridge International School, Johor Bahru
- Paragon Private and International, Johor Bahru
- Raffles American School, Iskandar Puteri, Johor
- R.E.A.L Schools, Johor Bahru, Johor
- Repton International School (formerly Excelsior), Johor Bahru, Johor
- Orbix International School, Muar, Johor
- Sekolah Rendah Seri Omega, Johor Bahru
- Sekolah Menengah Seri Omega, Johor Bahru
- Sekolah Rendah Sri Utama, Johor Bahru
- Sekolah Menengah Sri Utama, Johor Bahru
- Shattuck-St. Mary's Forest City International School, Forest City, Gelang Patah, Johor
- Stellar International School, Puteri Harbour, Johor
- Sri Ara International School, Johor Bahru
- Sunway International School, Sunway Iskandar, Johor Bahru
- Tenby Schools Setia Eco Gardens, Iskandar Puteri, Johor
- United International School, Batu Pahat, Johor

=== People's religious schools ===
- Maahad Tahfiz Al-Akhyar, Johor Bahru
- Madrasah Tahfiz Al-Iman (A), Taman Universiti, Skudai
- Sekolah Agama Parit Raja, Parit Raja, Batu Pahat
- Sekolah Rendah Islam (SRI ABIM)
- Sekolah Rendah Islam At-Tahfiz (SRIT), Pasir Gudang
- Sekolah Rendah Islam Hidayah, Johor Bahru
- Sekolah Rendah Agama Bersepadu, Batu Pahat
- Sekolah Rendah Agama Bersepadu, Johor Bahru
- Sekolah Rendah Agama Bersepadu, Kluang
- Sekolah Rendah Agama Bersepadu, Kota Tinggi
- Sekolah Rendah Agama Bersepadu, Mersing
- Sekolah Rendah Agama Bersepadu, Muar
- Sekolah Rendah Agama Bersepadu, Segamat
- Sekolah Rendah Agama Bersepadu, Pontian
- Sekolah Agama Dato Hj Abd Rahman Ahmad, Pasir Gudang
- Madrasah Tahfiz Huda Al-Islam, Johor Bahru
