= PHHS =

PHHS may refer to:

- Park Hill High School, in Kansas City, Missouri, United States
- Parsippany Hills High School, in Parsippany-Troy Hills, New Jersey, United States
- Pascack Hills High School, in Bergen County, New Jersey, United States
- Pennant Hills High School, in Pennant Hills, Sydney, New South Wales, Australia
- Perry Hall High School, in Baltimore, Maryland, United States
- Piedmont Hills High School, in San Jose, California, United States
- Pin Hwa High School, a private school in Klang, Selangor, Malaysia
- Port Huron High School, Port Huron, Michigan, United States
- Pei Hwa High School, Ledang, Johor, Malaysia
- Parkland Memorial Hospital
- Prince Henry's High School, Evesham, Worcestershire, United Kingdom.

== See also ==
- Patrick Henry High School (disambiguation)
- Pleasant Hill High School (disambiguation)
