= SMK Raja Muda =

Coordinates: 1.962384°N 102.647567°E

Information
- Teaching staff: c.108
- Enrollment: c.1600
- Website: www.smkrajamudamusa.com

Sekolah Menengah Kebangsaan Raja Muda better known as SENADA, is a school located in Parit Jawa, Muar, Johor, Malaysia.

== School structure ==
The school has approximately 108 teachers and 1600 students.

== See also ==
- List of schools in Johor
