= SMK Taman Selesa Jaya 2 =

- Main block of SMK Taman Selesa Jaya 2.
- Skudai, Johor; Malaysia

Information
- Type: Government Secondary School
- Motto: Berilmu, Beramal, Beriltizam; Latin: Sciens, Fidem, Credita
- Established: 2003
- Status: Controlled by Ministry Of Education
- Category: Suburban Secondary School
- Principal: Mr. Arsad bin Yahaya
- Grades: Form 1 - Form 5
- Enrolment: 989 (2010)
- National ranking: Grade B
- Yearbook: Sejati
- Other Names: Selesa Jaya Secondary School 2
- Abbreviation: SMKTSJ2
- Website: smktsj2.edupage.org

SMK Taman Selesa Jaya 2 is a day school in Skudai, Johor, Malaysia. The enrolment of students is controlled by the state Education Department of Johor. The school code at the Johor Bahru District Education Office is JEA 1084. It does not have a formal name in English but it is usually translated as Selesa Jaya Secondary School 2. The suffix 2 suggests a relationship with Taman Selesa Jaya which is located less than 5 km away. Despite their close proximity and co-operation, SMK Taman Selesa Jaya 2 is in no way, subordinate to Taman Selesa Jaya. To highlight its independence and identity, there have been attempts to change the school name.

== Composition of the school ==
As of 31 August 2010, there are 989 students enrolled in the school. The composition of the student body is as follows:

- Malay :15.17%
- Chinese :65.42%
- Indian :16.68%
- Others :1.42%
- Male :49.14%
- Female :50.86%

== History ==
SMK Taman Selesa Jaya 2 was established in 2003. The school is named after the neighbouring housing area, Taman Selesa Jaya in the Central District of Johor Bahru, Johor Darul Takzim. The school is located about 25 km from Johor Bahru city center.

The school was built on a ste covering 1.79 square hectares. The tender to construct the school was awarded to the Syarikat Asal Bina Sdn. Bhd. Basic construction work began in 2001 and operations started on 1 January 2004. During the construction period, Mr. Mustafa bin Mastri was appointed as coordinator of the new school.

The cost of the construction was close to RM 11.7 million. In 2004, the school contained 36 classrooms and some special rooms such as a computer lab, a language lab, a music room, and prayer for the benefit of students of this school.

Seven principals have led the school: 2004 - 2005

- Mr. Misli bin Rosbadi

2005 - 2006

- Mr. Hashim bin Hj Mohd Dom

2006 - 2009

- Ms. Hajah Kamsiah bt Md Naroh (retired)

2009 - 2011

- Ms. Tan Moi Yan (transferred to SMK Infant Jesus Convent, Johor Bahru)

2011 – 2014

- Ms. Tan Seow Heng (retired)

2014 - 2015

- Ms. Hajah Halimah bt Ahmad

2015–present

- Mr. Arsad bin Yahaya

In 2004, the Association of Parents and Teachers Association (PTA) was established with Mr. Hassan bin Hj Mohd Amin being the first president up until 2009. The PTA is led by Mr Zainal bin Abu Bakar.

In 2007, the school introduced the Science Stream and Information & Communication Technology (ICT)Stream for students in Secondary 4 (equivalent to Grade 10 in the US) in addition to the Art Stream which has been offered since 2004.

The Internet Access Center contains 10 computers and a printer that has access to the School Net.

== School identity ==
=== School badge ===
General shape

- The oval shape symbolises ideals and aspirations
- The formation of the circle out of 3 pieces of puzzle represents unity among the members of the school.

Symbols

- The compass represents the command in mathematical knowledge.
- The flask represents scientific knowledge.
- The red Rehal means readiness to sacrifice for the greater good.
- The bow signifies achievement in sports.
- The gear represents the advancement of technology.
- Two layers of the book represents a lifetime learning.

Colors

- Red symbolises the fighting spirit.
- Blue symbolises harmony.
- Green symbolises religious faith.
- White represents purity of mind.

== Academic performance ==
In 2009, the passing rate of the students in PMR (Penilaian Menengah Rendah) was 74.87%, 80.90%, 79.00% and 93.40% for Malay Language, English Language, Mathematics and Science, respectively. The overall passing rate was 54.03%.

=== Extracurricular activities ===
On 26 May 2009, Mohd Imran Hussein, Siti Nur Khatijah Samat, Nur Darina Kamarudin and Mohd Khair Mohd Nasir emerged as the state first runner-up in the Johor statewide Career Folio Competition.

In 2005, a youth unit of Red Crescent Malaysia, BSMM UB77, was formed at SMK Taman Selesa Jaya 2.

== See also ==
- List of schools in Johor
