= Taman Johor Jaya =

Suburb in Johor Bahru, Johor, Malaysia

Johor Jaya
- Suburb of Johor Bahru
- Taman Johor Jaya
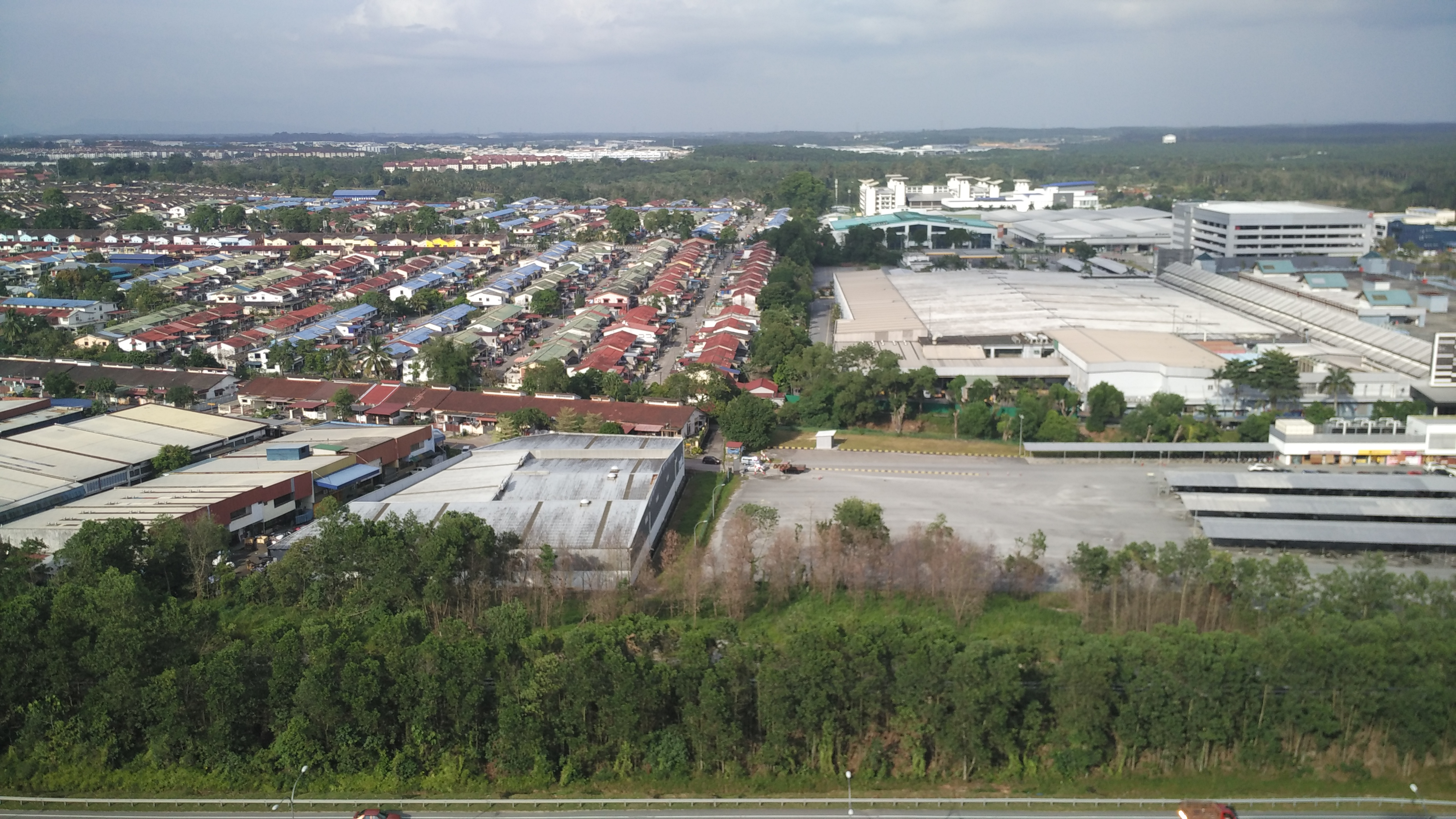
- Taman Johor Jaya with supermarket Giant on the right
- Interactive map of Johor Jaya
- Coordinates: 1°32′15″N 103°48′10″E
- Country: Malaysia
- State: Johor
- District: Johor Bahru
- City: Johor Bahru

Area
  - Total: 5.9 km^{2} (2.26 sq mi)

Population (2008)
  - Total: 66,000
- Time zone: UTC+8 (MST)
  - Summer (DST): Not observed
- Postal code: 81100
- Website: mbjb.gov.my

Taman Johor Jaya is a suburb in Johor Bahru, Johor, Malaysia. Johor Jaya consists of mainly residential zones, but it also has light industrial and commercial zones.

== Development history ==
Johor Jaya was developed by housing developer Daiman Development Berhad, a subsidiary of Daiman Group. Construction and development works started in 1983. The first phase of development focused mainly on the construction of single-storey terrace houses. Construction of the houses was completed in 1987, but residents were initially hesitant to move into their houses due to reports of house break-ins. Daiman subsequently announced plans in January 1989 to develop the next three phases in Anggerik, Dedap and Teratai. Plans were made to build single and double storey terrace houses, shophouses and a sports complex. Development of these three phases was completed by 1992, and there were some 11,132 residential houses built by then. The then-general manager of Daiman Group, Tan Yeong Kan said that the completion of the development phases were fuelled by the company's cash surpluses with no borrowings. Development of the Keembong and Seroja phases followed suit in 1992 and 1993. The development of the final phase of Johor Jaya around Jalan Rosemerah Utama began in the mid-1990s and concluded with the construction of build-to-order bungalows in the area to the west of the Daiman Golf Course in 1998.

The Family Food Centre was built in 2004 along Jalan Dedap 4 serving various type of common Malay cuisine. A new neighbouring megamall, ÆON Tebrau City, was built in 2005 along Tebrau Highway. Other neighbouring hypermarkets include Giant in Plentong and NSK Trade City along Tebrau Highway, just south of ÆON. The At-Taqwa Mosque, which was built in 2009, is located along Jalan Dedap 1. Johor Jaya new police station is in Rosmerah. There is also a Hindu Temple located beside the police station.

== Demographics ==
Ethnic composition of Johor Jaya
Ethnicities / Nationality	Percentage
Chinese	49%
Malay	44%
Indians	7%

Most of Johor Jaya's residents are Chinese (49%), followed by Malays (44%) and Indians (7%).

== Commerce ==
Johor Jaya's key shopping district is located Dedap phase, and is home to various SMEs that consisted of eateries, pubs and car repair shops. Morning markets set up by street vendors are also a common sight on Sunday mornings, although some of the vendors are illegal and shoppers have complained of traffic congestion problems. Durian vendors also make their presence felt between June and August, which are brought in from Bentong, Pahang.

== Education ==
- SJK (C) Johor Jaya, Jalan Rosmerah 4
- SK Taman Johor Jaya 1, Jalan Bakawali 13
- SK Taman Johor Jaya 2, Jalan Keembong 41
- SK Taman Johor Jaya 3, Jalan Teratai 50
- SK Taman Johor Jaya 5, Jalan Anggerik 21
- SA Taman Johor Jaya, Jalan Dedap 10
- SMK Agama Johor Bahru, Jalan Anggerik 21
- SMK Taman Johor Jaya 1, Jalan Bakawali 75
- SMK Taman Johor Jaya 2, Jalan Teratai 32

== Transportation ==
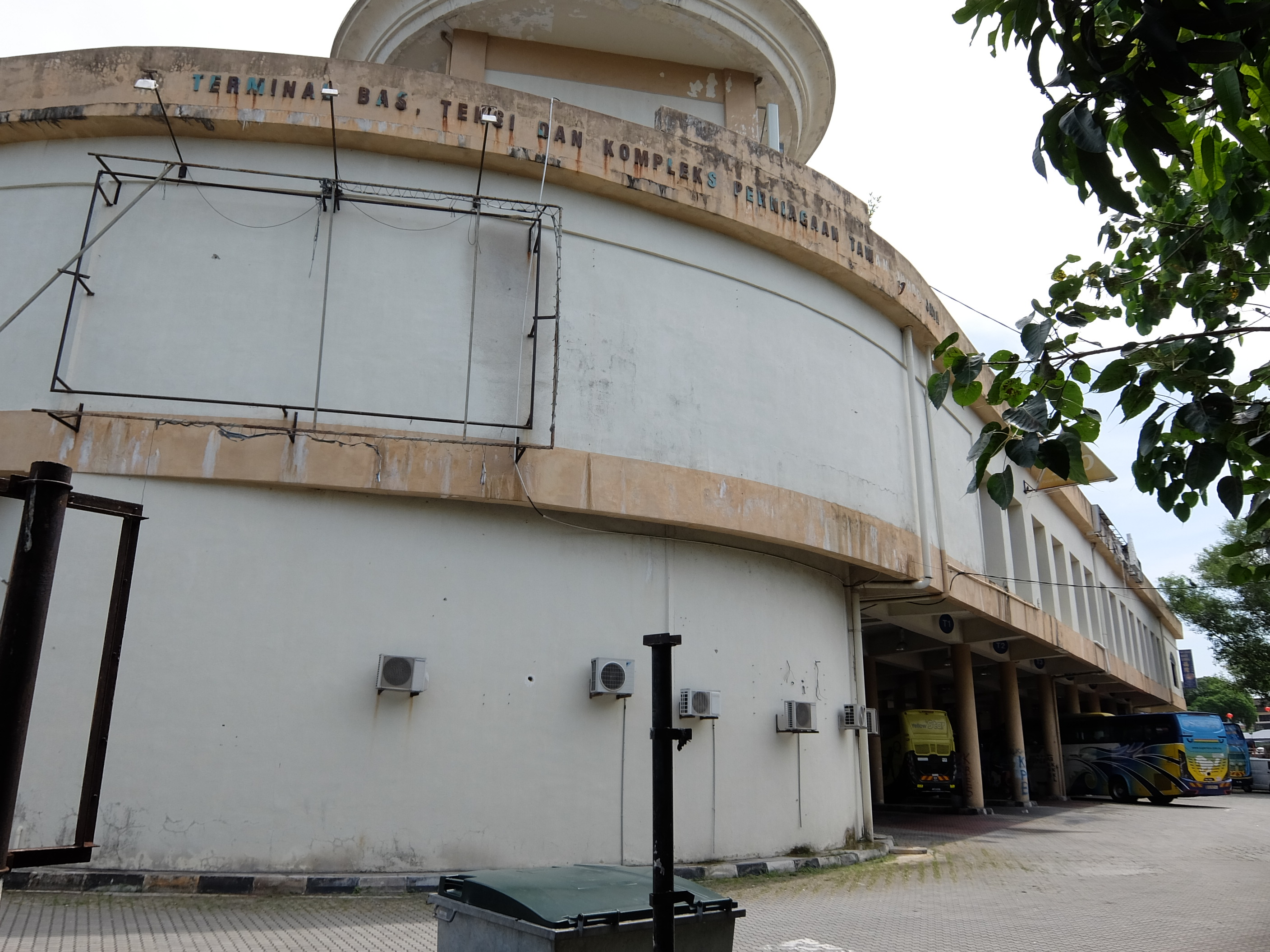
Taman Johor Jaya Bus and Taxi Terminal

The suburb is accessible by BAS.MY Johor Bahru route J20 from JB Sentral.
