= SMK Taman Johor Jaya 1 =

Sekolah Menengah Kebangsaan Taman Johor Jaya 1
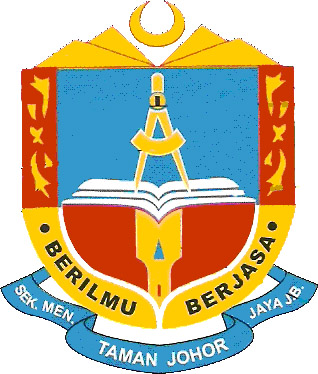
- Jalan Bakawali 75, Taman Johor Jaya, 81100 Johor Bahru, Johor, Malaysia

Information
- Type: Public Secondary School
- Motto: Berilmu, Berjasa
- Established: 3 December 1989
- School district: Pasir Gudang
- School code: JEA1045
- Principal: En. Hashim bin Andimori (2025 until now)
- Senior Assistance: -
- Grades: PER, Form 1 - Form 6
- Enrollment: 1000+
- Language: Malay. English
- Colors: Yellow and Blue
- Slogan: Memimpin Kecemerlangan; Quality on Everything We Do
- Newspaper: "The Jaya Magazine"
- Information: +607-3546651
- Website: smktjj1.edu.my; f6m2jj.edu.my (Form 6)

The Sekolah Menengah Kebangsaan (SMK) Taman Johor Jaya (1), abbreviated as SMKTJJ1, SMKJJ1, JJ1 or JAY1 is a public secondary school in Malaysia. It is located in Taman Johor Jaya, Johor Bahru, Johor.

== History ==
Sekolah Menengah Kebangsaan Taman Johor Jaya 1 was officially established on 3 December 1989. Its first principal was Encik Mohd Salleh bin Abd Rahman. In the early stages of its establishment, the school had to use one building block of Sekolah Menengah Seri Amar Pandan. The school staff at that time consisted of 14 teachers, a clerk, a laboratory assistant and 240 students. On January 1, 1990, the school logo was ready to be designed on the efforts of Mr. Danari, Senior Assistant school at the time. The school song was composed by Mr. Misrol and senikata was composed by Mr. Danari in April 1991.

In the 1990/91 school session the school had to use two building blocks of Sekolah Menengah Ulu Tiram which was growing by 320 students and 19 teachers. The school building at Taman Johor Jaya was not yet ready. Due to the construction of the abandoned school, the school was once again forced to take a ride at Sekolah Kebangsaan Taman Johor Jaya for the 1991/92 school session. This situation indirectly solves the problem of student transportation because the majority of students live in Taman Johor Jaya, and the rest around Mount Austin, Pandan and Taman Saujana plantations. The students here are mostly middle-income families. The total number of students in this school session was 750 students with a teaching staff of 33 teachers.

In this session, the SRP examination was held for the first time in this school and the results obtained were encouraging, namely the percentage of approval was 85.5% and 69% had obtained an A Rank. The best student at that time was Soh Chiang Joo with an aggregate result of 5. The school building in Taman Johor Jaya was fully utilised starting from the 1992/93 school session. The school was officially handed over on 2 August 1993 by the Jabatan Kerja Raya to the Jabatan Pelajaran Negeri Johor. In this session, the flow of Science and literature was introduced in Level 4. The name of the school was changed to Sekolah Menengah Kebangsaan Taman Johor Jaya 1 after the establishment of Sekolah Menengah Kebangsaan Taman Johor Jaya 2 in December 1994. To meet the needs of the educational process, through the efforts and cooperation of the PTA, principals, teachers, accomplices and students of the school has successfully built an open Hall whose construction process began in September 1997 and was fully completed in 1998.

In 2008, due to the efforts of its principal, Encik Abd Rashid bin Sulaiman, KRK classes were held at SMKTJJ1 starting with 3 Form 1 KRK classes. SMKTJJ1 continued to make strides in the aspect of physical changes, when an allocation of 9 million through the 9MP was distributed to the construction of two new 4-storey building blocks along with a vault which began to be used in 2010. Form 6 or pre-university classes were first opened at this school in 2011, starting with 2 humanitarian flow classes. With the aim of adding comfort to students, the school's open hall has been upgraded to a closed hall, and was inaugurated by YB Tan Cher Puk, assemblyman of Johor Jaya on 21 January 2013 under the name of dewan JJINI. However, the name of the hall was changed to Dewan Permata Jaya by En Mohamed Salleh Bin Zainal Abidin, principal of SMK Taman Johor Jaya 1.

== List of principals of SMK Taman Johor Jaya 1 ==
No.	Name	Term
1	En. Mohd Salleh bin Abd Rahman	Dec 1989 – Jan 1993
2	Pn. Fatinah bt Abd Jalil	Feb 1993 – Jan 1994
3	Pn. Wan Fatimah bt Ahmad	Feb 1995 – Nov 1995
4	En. Abd Manaf bin Muslim	Nov 1995 – Dec 1997
5	En. Tong Han Chong	Jan 1998 – Dec 1998
6	Hjh. Halimah bt Shaaban	Jan 1999 – Feb 2001
7	Pn. Juriah bt Mohamed	Feb 2001 – Sept 2006
8	Pn. Chong Lian How	Sept 2006 – Jun 2007
9	En. Abd Rashid bin Sulaiman	Jun 2007 – Dec 2008
10	Hjh. Fatimah bt Ahmad	Jan 2009 – Mar 2012
11	En. Ang Tauk Khoon	Mar 2012 – Aug 2017
12	En. Salleh bin Zainal Abidin	Sept 2017 – -
13	Dr. Hjh Muhazian bt Md Noor	– Feb 2025
14	En. Hashim bin Andimori	Feb 2025 – SEKARANG

== List of Classes ==
=== Peralihan ===
- Peralihan: 2 classes (afternoon session)

=== Form 1 and Form 2 ===
- 6 classes Form 1 (afternoon session)
- 6 classes Form 2 (afternoon session)

=== Form 3 ===
- 6 classes Form 3 (morning session)

=== Form 4 and Form 5 ===
- SN - Science Stream: 1 class (morning session)
- SG/SK - Computer Sciences: 1 class (morning session)
- PA - Account: 1 class (morning session)
- SRT - Sains Rumah Tangga (Home Economics): 1 class (morning session)
- PN - Business: 1 class (morning session)
- PSV - Art: 1 class (morning session)
- TERAS - No Elective Subjects: 1 class (morning session)
- SS1 - SAINS KEMANUSIAAN -SAINS SOSIAL
- SS2 - SAINS KEMANUSIAAN -SAINS SOSIAL
- SS3 - SAINS KEMANUSIAAN -SAINS SOSIAL

=== Form 6 ===
Kelas Fizikal

Kelas Anatomi

Kelas Fisiologi

Kelas Teknologi

Kelas Perakaunan

Kelas Ekonomi

Kelas Sains Sosial

Kelas Sains Kemanusiaan

== Co-Curricular ==
On every Wednesday, co-curricular activities are usually held.

=== List of Uniformed Bodies ===
- Malaysian Red Crescent Brigade Cadet
- St John Ambulance Brigade Cadet
- Malaysian Police Brigade Cadet
- Malaysian Fire Brigade Cadet
- Kadet Remaja Sekolah Malaysia
- Kadet Pandu Puteri
- Kadet Puteri Islam
- Malaysia Civil Defence Force

=== Societies and Club ===
List of Societies	List of Club
Malay Language Society	Badminton Club
English Language Society	Bowling Club
Chinese Language Society	Tennis Club
Tamil Language Society	Basketball Club
Science & Mathematics Society	Fitness Club
History and Geography Society	The Soccer Club Takraw
Life Skills Society	Volleyball Club
Visual & Creative Arts Society	Golf Club
ICT and Computer Club	The Petanque Club
Leo Club	Football and Futsal Club
Discuss & Debate Club	Hockey Club
Islamic Society	Netball Club
Art Photography & Video Club	Rugby Club
Culture, Theater, Dance & Choir Club	Softball Club
The 3P Club	Elite Archery Sports Club
Road Safety Club	The Carrom Club
Crime Prevention, Anti-Drug and AIDS Club	Chess Club
The Kopreasi Club	Chinese Chess Club
Consumer Club	Swimming Club
The Doktor Muda Club	
The SPBT Club	
Coaching & Career Club	
The Rukun Negara & Rakan Muda Club	
