= Yong Peng High School =

Independent school in Yong Peng, Johor, Malaysia

Coordinates: 2°00′50.3″N 103°03′42.3″E

Yong Peng High School Yǒng Píng Zhōng Xué
- 永平中学
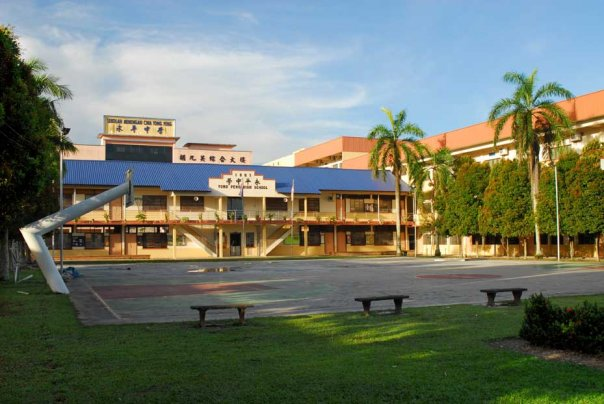

Location
- Jalan Sekolah Cina; Yong Peng, Johor; Malaysia

Information
- Type: Independent
- Established: 1957; 69 years ago
- Website: www.yphs.edu.my

Yong Peng High School
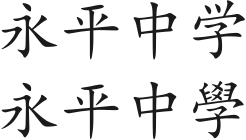
- Yong Peng High School in Simplified Chinese (top) and Traditional Chinese character (below)
- Traditional Chinese: 永平中學
- Simplified Chinese: 永平中学
Transcriptions
Standard Mandarin
- Hanyu Pinyin: Yǒngpíng Zhōngxué

Yong Peng High School (Chinese: 永平中学) is a co-educational Chinese independent high school in Yong Peng, Johor, Malaysia.
