= SMK Taman Daya =

Taman Daya National Secondary School
- Sekolah Menengah Kebangsaan Taman Daya
- Johor Bahru, Johor Darul Ta'zim; Malaysia

Information
- Type: Public
- Motto: Berilmu Berwawasan
- School district: Pasir Gudang
- Category: Secondary
- Principal: Puan Azlinda binti Samsuri
- Colours: Yellow, Blue, Red, Green, Purple, Orange
- Nickname: TDS
- Yearbook: Daya
- Website: smktamandaya.wixsite.com/smktd

Sekolah Menengah Kebangsaan Taman Daya or TDS (Taman Daya School) is a secondary school located in Jalan Rumbia 39, Taman Daya, Johor Bahru, Johor, Malaysia.

== See also ==
- Education in Malaysia
