= Pei Hwa Independent High School =

School in Tangkak, Johor, Malaysia

- 利丰港培华独立中学; Sekolah Menengah Persendirian Pei Hwa

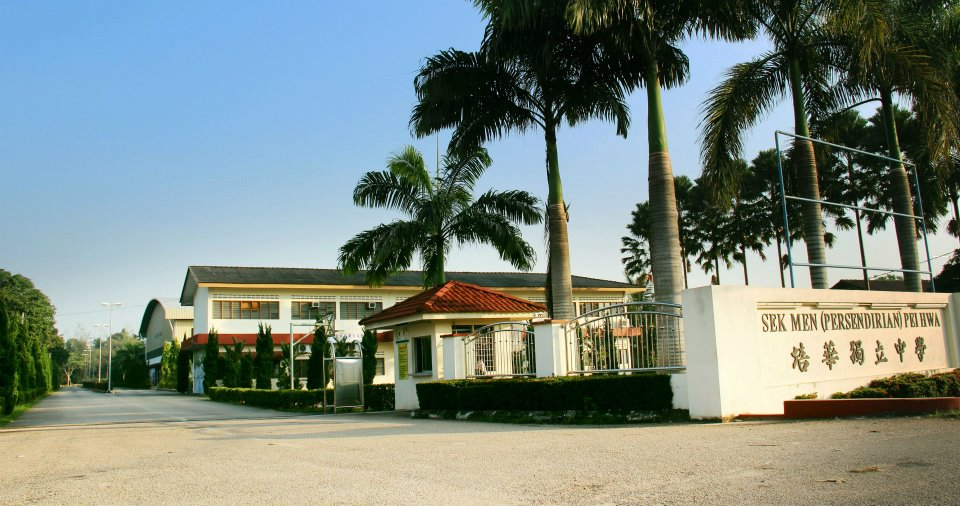

Location
- 53, Jalan Serom; Sungai Mati, Johor, 84400; Malaysia; 2.1488°N 102.5646°E

Information
- Type: Chinese independent high school
- Motto: 礼, 义, 廉, 耻 (Propriety, Righteousness, Incorruptibility, Sense of shame)
- Established: Established in 1929; Closed in 1942; Re-opened in 1946; Reformed in 1962
- School district: Tangkak
- Principal: Mr. Ang Chee Boon
- Staff: 13(2021)
- Faculty: 49(2021)
- Grades: Junior section(3 years); Senior section(3 years); Conditional Promotion & Repetition System
- Enrollment: 670(2021)
- Language: Mandarin Chinese, Malaysian language, English
- Colour: Green
- Slogan: 爱校爱家，成人成才 Love school, love home; be a person with good character and great talent
- Newspaper: 培华简讯
- Exam: UEC
- Website: peihwahs.edu.my

Pei Hwa Independent High School
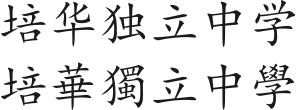
- Pei Hwa Independent High School in Simplified Chinese (top) and Traditional Chinese (below) character
- Traditional Chinese: 培華獨立中學
- Simplified Chinese: 培华独立中学
Transcriptions
Standard Mandarin
- Hanyu Pinyin: Péihuá Dúlì Zhōngxué

Pei Hwa Independent High School (simplified Chinese: 培华独立中学; traditional Chinese: 培華獨立中學;Malay language: Sekolah Menengah Persendirian Pei Hwa) is a Chinese independent high school located in Sungai Mati, Tangkak District, Johor, Malaysia. Pei Hwa High School was established in 1929 by Cai Jing San, Zheng Qing Mou, Li Hui Mu, Zhang Yu Cai, Liu Guang Wen, Cai Qi Zheng, Chen Shu, Li Guo Zhu (transliteration) and others. Pei Hwa High School was one of the minorities of schools that decided to remain apart from Malaysia national school system. It was set up with the main intention of providing education in the Chinese language. Being an independent school, the school does not receive funding from the Malaysian government and needs to sustain itself through student fees and donations from the public.

Students in the school study in three junior middle levels and three senior middle levels, similar to the secondary school systems in mainland China and Taiwan; each level usually takes one year. Like the students in public secondary schools, students in the school are put into several streams like Science or Art/Commerce in the senior middle levels. They take standardised tests known as the Unified Examination Certificate (UEC) at the end of Junior Middle 3 and Senior Middle 3.

== History ==
=== 1929–1946 ===
Pei Hwa Primary School was established in 1929 by local enthusiasts is located at Yu Yuan Huo Jiao Chang, San Jiao Bu. Later, the school moved to Kwang Tung Association. The student population increased so much that the school borrowed premises from Chinese Rubber Trade Association as the second school building in 1936. At the same time, Tai Chang Company contributed a piece of land and the school also purchased a piece of land for building purpose, the school space increased to 4 acres. In 1938, the school moved to its new building; the number of students was around 140.

Following the Japanese occupation of Malaysia in 1942, the school was forced to stop classes, all the school equipment was destroyed. In 1946, classes resumed.

=== 1947–1962 ===
With the development of the school and the demands of society, the school opened upper primary classes in 1947. In 1949, the school started enrolling junior middle one's students, secondary education was begun and school gradually increased in size. Lack of school buildings to expand the school construction projects in full swing. By 1958, the number of the students is over 1,000, due to lack of facilities, primary and secondary schools are forced to have double shifts, morning and afternoon shifts, minimising the hours children spend in school. The primary school is quite separate from secondary school in the same year. Primary school moved to their present location at second year, now namely Sekolah Jenis Kebangsaan Cina Pei Hwa (SJK(C) Pei Hwa). In 1960, the school offer higher secondary classes, becoming the highest institution in North Muar.

Under The Education Act 1961, the school was reform into Sekolah Menengah Jenis Kebangsaan Pei Hwa (SMJK Pei Hwa), also led the student movement during the restructuring. However, mother-tongue education SHOULD NOT be abandoned. Because of the school original calibration certificates are still saved, so the council of the school decided to continue the provision of mother-tongue education, the school re-run Chinese-language school, the Pei Hwa High School soon after reformed. Earlier, the school students mostly are students whose ages were older than the average.

=== 1963–Present ===
The school faced their deepest crisis since its founding having to focus as much on economic challenges and the source of students, in addition, the school did not have its own campus, and it was just only sharing facilities with SMJK Pei Hwa. In 1971, Che Kuan Khor Moral Uplifting Society, Sungai Mati and the Chairman of Pei Hwa Alumni Association, Wu Nai Guang donated a piece of land to the school for school construction purposes. The school was moved to its current location in 1975, just across from SMJK Pei Hwa. At that time, the school had only 46 students.

With the development of the school, the number of students went up to 717 in 1987. With the rapid development of information technology, the school started their computer classes. The school became the first to establish furniture-carpentry courses in 1989. From 1996 to 1999, the carpentry class students have participated in The Malaysia Skills Competition (MSC) and won Prime Minister's Golden Hands Awards for four consecutive years. The students of the carpentry class represented Malaysia to take part in The 35th WorldSkills International Competition in Montreal, Canada in 1999. But the carpentry class suspended in 2001 for lack of finances. Science classes were reopened in 2001. In June 2004, the school brought back a 6-day school week.

On 28 July 2008, the school signed a sister school agreement with Tsun Jin High School, Kuala Lumpur. Same year, the school won the UEC (Junior) Language Category Most Improve Award in Tan Kah Kee Award 2008. On 3 December 2012, the school signed a sister school agreement with Chung Chou University of Science and Technology, Taiwan.

As China becomes stronger, the status of Chinese language is rising; the number of the school is increasing also.

== Facilities ==
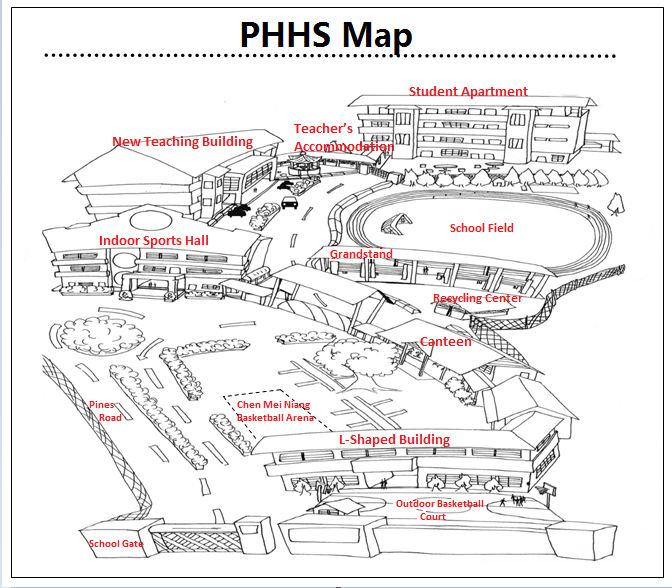
School Map

- New Teaching Building: Ground-breaking ceremony was held on 6 October 2003 by Dato' Hajji Abdul Ghani Othman, Menteri Besar of the state of Johor. The Building was inaugurated on 13 August 2004. It is a 4-storey building totally included a new general office, 24 classrooms and air-conditioned AVA room.
- L-Shaped Building: This building was completed in 1980 and start using it in the second year; it was included 7 classrooms, 2 washrooms, 1 office, art room, sales department, and a science laboratory.
- Indoor Sports Hall: Construction start in 1987 and completion in 1989. The construction includes 1 basketball court, 2 badminton courts, some classroom and E-library.
- Wang Zha Mo Lecture Theatre: Located on the ground floor of new teaching building and start using it on 6 September 2008.
- Cai Ming Fu E-library: The library began being used on 6 September 2008 and it was extended with Dato' Yu Bing Shun's donation.
- Accommodation: Teacher's accommodation (5 separate residential units, 3 rooms each) and Lin Jin Si student apartment (a five-story, 80-unit apartment building), both were completed in 1997 and the opening ceremony took place on 27 June 1998.
- Chen Mei Niang Basketball Arena: Start using it from 1 July 2011, the opening ceremony was hosted by Dato' Hamim Samuri, Member of Parliament of Ledang District.
- Yacca Garden: It was opened on 6 September 2008.
- Recycling Center: Formerly the student activity center, originated in 1984.
- School Field and Grandstand.
- Outdoor Basketball Court.
- Chee Soon Memorial Pavilion: This memorial pavilion was built in memory of Ang Chee Soon, former headmaster of the school.

School Gate	Pines Road	L-shaped Classroom Building and Outdoor Basketball Court	Chen Mei Niang Basketball Arena
School Hall	Classroom building	Wang Zha Mo Lecture Theatre	Canteen
Lin Jin Si Student Apartment	Chee Soon Memorial Pavilion	Grandstand	Field

== Successive Principals ==
No.	Service Period	Name of the Principal
01	1962–1963	Chen Yue Lin (transliteration)
02	1964–1966	Chen Ji Ping (transliteration)
03	1967–1969	Mo Ze Ying (transliteration)
04	1970–1974	Xie You Zhai (transliteration)
05	1975–1985.08	Ang Chee Soon
06	1985.09-1993.11	Tey Tong Kem
07	1993.12-1995.11	Lin Jia Zuo (transliteration)
08	1995.12-1999.11	Ng Siong Kwee
09	1999.12-2003.11	Wong Siong Sin
10	2004.04-2008.03	Ng Kim Kuee
11	2008.04-2012.05	San Son Cheng
12	2012.06-2019.11	Kek Tian Peng
13	2019.11-Present	Rose Chen Yeok Ling

== Sister Schools ==
1. (Taiwan) Chaoyang University of Technology (2007)
2. (Malaysia) Tsun Jin High School (2008)
3. (Taiwan) Tainan University of Technology (2008)
4. (Taiwan) Tajen University (2008)
5. (Taiwan) Chung Chou University of Science and Technology (2012)

== See also ==
- Chinese independent high school
- Education in Malaysia
- List of schools in Johor
- List of schools in Malaysia
- Chinese independent high school
- Malaysian Chinese
- Overseas Chinese
- Confucianism
- Chinese culture
- Chinese characters
