= Pleasant Hill High School =

Pleasant Hill High School may refer to:

- Pleasant Hill High School (Illinois), Pleasant Hill, Illinois
- Pleasant Hill High School (Louisiana), Pleasant Hill, Sabine Parish, Louisiana
- Pleasant Hill High School (Missouri), Pleasant Hill, Missouri
- Pleasant Hill High School (Oregon), Pleasant Hill, Oregon
- Pleasant Hill High School (California), Pleasant Hill, California
