= Pei Chun High School (Independent) =

School in Pontian, Johor, Malaysia

Pei Chun High School (Independent) 笨珍培群独立中学
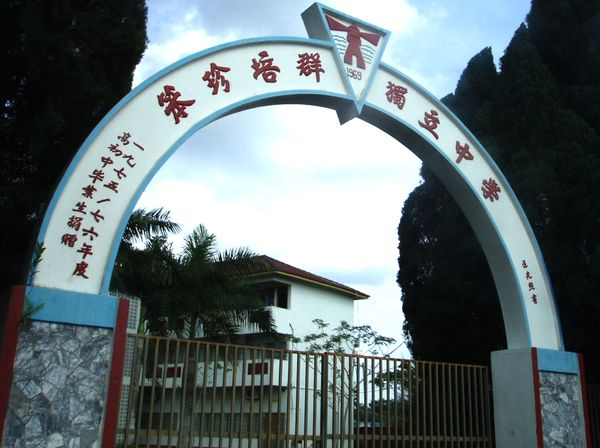

Location
- Pontian, Johor; Malaysia
- Coordinates: 1.5034°N 103.3851°E

Information
- Type: Chinese Independent High School
- Motto: 智 诚 勤 勇
- Established: 1962
- Principal: 葉福明
- Website: www.peichunhs.edu.my

Pei Chun High School (Independent)
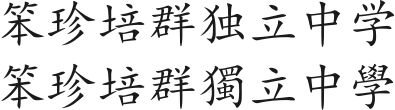
- Pei Chun High School (Independent) in Simplified Chinese (top) and Traditional Chinese (below) character
- Traditional Chinese: 笨珍培群獨立中學
- Simplified Chinese: 笨珍培群独立中学
Transcriptions
Standard Mandarin
- Hanyu Pinyin: Bènzhēn Péiqún Dúlì Zhōngxué

Pei Chun High School (Independent) (simplified Chinese: 笨珍培群独立中学; Malay: Sekolah Menengah Persendirian Pei Chun) was founded in 1962 after having been separated from Pei Chun School, located in Pontian, Malaysia. It has 1500 students as of January 2015.

== History ==
Pei Chun Independent School originally started as Pei Chun School in 1922 at Jalan Teo Kang Sui. In 1952, the school was enrolling junior middle students and secondary education was begun and the school gradually increased in size. Under The Education Act 1961, the school was separated into Sekolah Menengah Jenis Kebangsaan Pei Chun (SMJK Pei Chun), Pei Chun Independent school, Pei Chun (1) Primary School( SJK(C) Pei Chun (1) ) and Pei Chun (2) Primary School( SJK(C) Pei Chun (2) ). In 1964, the school faced its deepest crisis since its founding, having to focus as much on economic challenges and the source of students. Also, the school did not have its own campus, and it was just sharing facilities with Pei Chun School. The school was moved to its current location in 1969, Pontian Besar. Starting from the 1970s, the school received much support from the Chinese community in Pontian and the school grew gradually from the 1980s.
