= Skudai =

Suburb of Iskandar Puteri, Malaysia

- Suburb of Iskandar Puteri
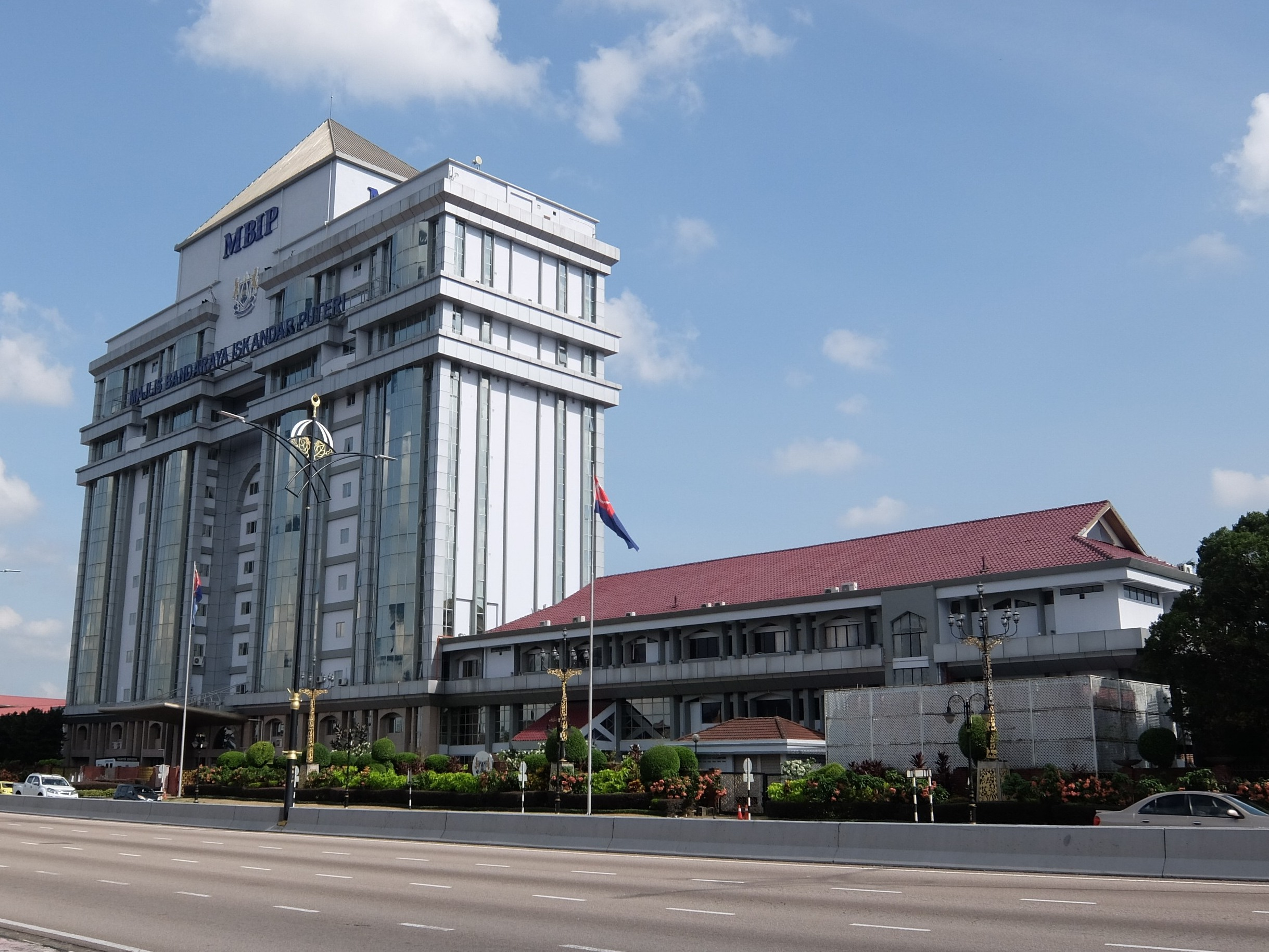
- Former Iskandar Puteri City Council Headquarters along Skudai Highway
- Interactive map of Skudai
- Coordinates: 1°32′00″N 103°40′00″E
- Country: Malaysia
- State: Johor
- District: Johor Bahru
- City: Iskandar Puteri
- Time zone: UTC+8 (MST)
- Postcode: 81300
- Dialling code: +607
- Website: www.mbip.gov.my

Skudai (also spelled Sekudai) is a town in Iskandar Puteri, Johor, Malaysia. It is about 13 km northwest from Johor Bahru's central business district.

== Government ==
Skudai falls within the Iskandar Puteri constituency in the Malaysian Parliament, represented beginning in 2022 by Liew Chin Tong. In the Johor State Legislative Assembly it is in the Skudai constituency.

== Education ==
It is the site of Universiti Teknologi Malaysia and Southern University College.

Secondary schools include SMK Taman Selesa Jaya 2.
